= Dodge WC series =

WW II family of ~400,000 Dodge light 4×4 & 6×6 trucks

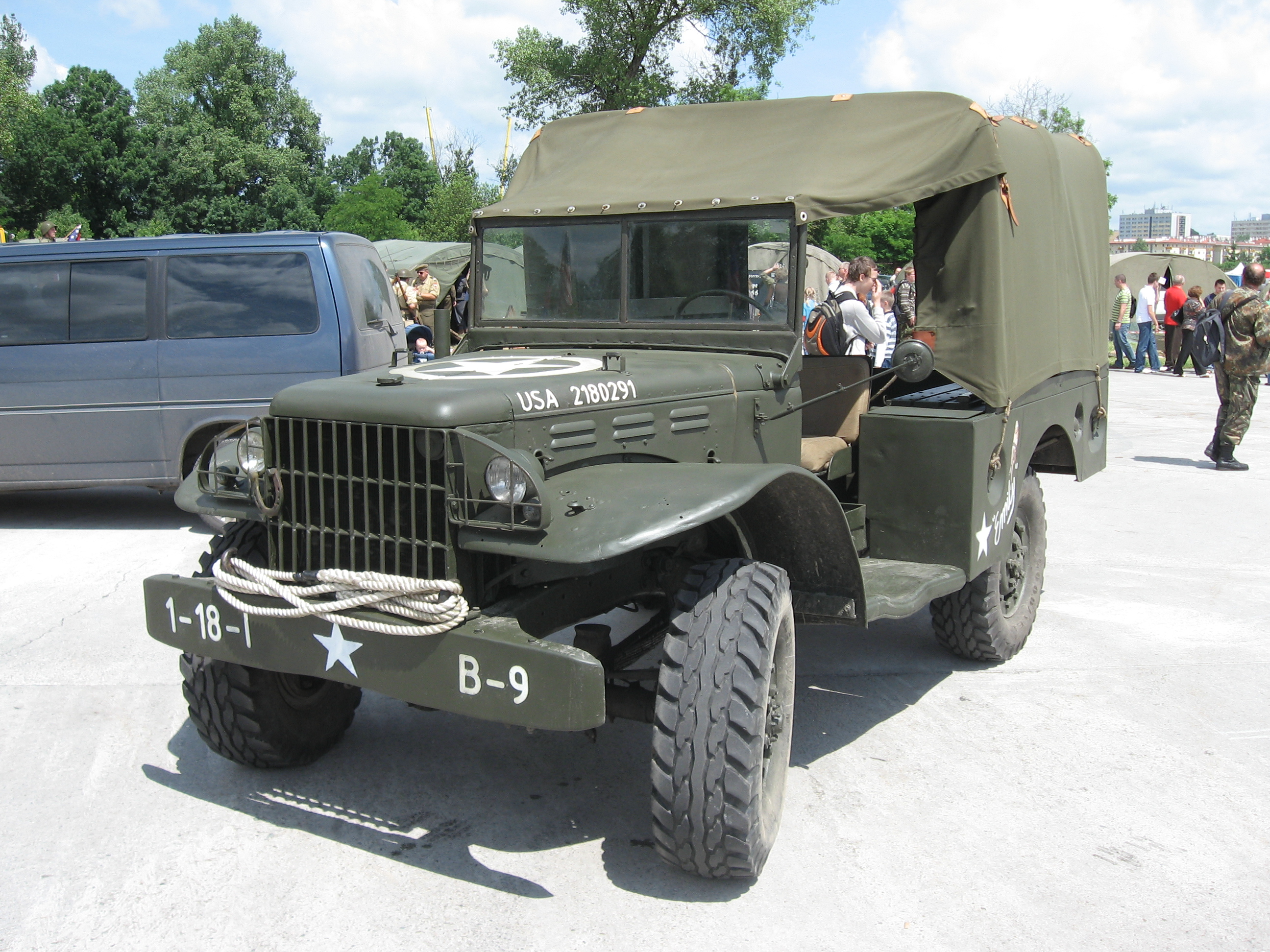
- The most produced variants in the range were the 3/4‑ton, 4×4, WC-51 and WC-52 Weapons Carriers – shown a WC-51: short front bumper, without winch.
- Type: Light 4×4 trucks, 1/2-ton and 3/4-ton, in many variants; Medium 6×6 trucks: 1 1/2-ton for cargo, troops & weapons; Related truck models in 4×2 and 4×4, light and medium
- Place of origin: Warren Truck Assembly, Michigan, United States

Service history
- Wars: World War II; Korean War; Various post 1945 conflicts

Production history
- Manufacturer: Dodge / Fargo, assembled at Lynch Road Assembly, Hamtramck, MI
- Produced: 1940–1945
- No. built: Total WC Series: ~382,350; Excluding variants below Consisting of: — 1/2-ton 4×2: 1,542 models All 4×4 Models: ~337,600 — 1/2-ton 4×4 models: ~82,390 (1940–1942) (Note: Chrysler Corporation Mopar's 1946 annual model chart and serial number guide indicates 4,640 1/2‑ton VC units, and a maximum of 77,765 1/2‑ton WC serial numbers: – 31,935 units of the WC-1 through WC-11, – 17,293 units of the WC-12 through WC-20, and – 28,537 units of the WC-21 through WC-27 and WC-40 through WC-43) (Note: The Summary Report – Tank-Automotive Materiel lists a total of 82,454 1/2‑ton 4×4 trucks (page 58), including 65 Marmon-Herrington Fords (p. 57) and 12 'Amphibian Car Corp.' units (p. 55), and a matching number of 4640 VC-series units (1940), leaving 82,377 half-ton, G-505 series, 4×4 units) — 3/4-ton 4×4 models: 255,195 (1942–1945); 1 1/2-ton 6×6 Models — 43,224 units
- Variants: Total Variants – 32,322; D8A 1/2-ton, 4×4 – 3,000 units (1941, Canada); D3/4 APT 3/4-ton, 4×4 – 11,750 units (1945, Canada); VF-401 – VF-407 1 1/2-ton, 4×4 – 6,472 units (1940); T-203B 1 1/2-ton, 4×4 – 1,500 units (1941); WF-32 / G-618 1 1/2-ton, 4×2 – 9,600 units (1942–1944, Iran)

Specifications (WC-51 / WC-52)
- Mass: 5,250 lb (2,380 kg) empty (5,550 lb (2,520 kg) with winch)
- Length: 166 7/8 in (424 cm) (176 1/2 in (448 cm) with winch)
- Width: 82 3/4 in (210 cm)
- Height: 81 7/8 in (208 cm)
- Engine: Dodge T-214; 92 hp (69 kW)
- Payload capacity: 1,500 pounds (680 kg)
- Transmission: 4 speed × 1 range
- Suspension: Live beam axles on leaf springs
- Ground clearance: 10 23/32 in (27.2 cm)
- Fuel capacity: 30 US gal (114 L)
- Operational range: 240 mi (386 km)
- Maximum speed: 55 mph (89 km/h)

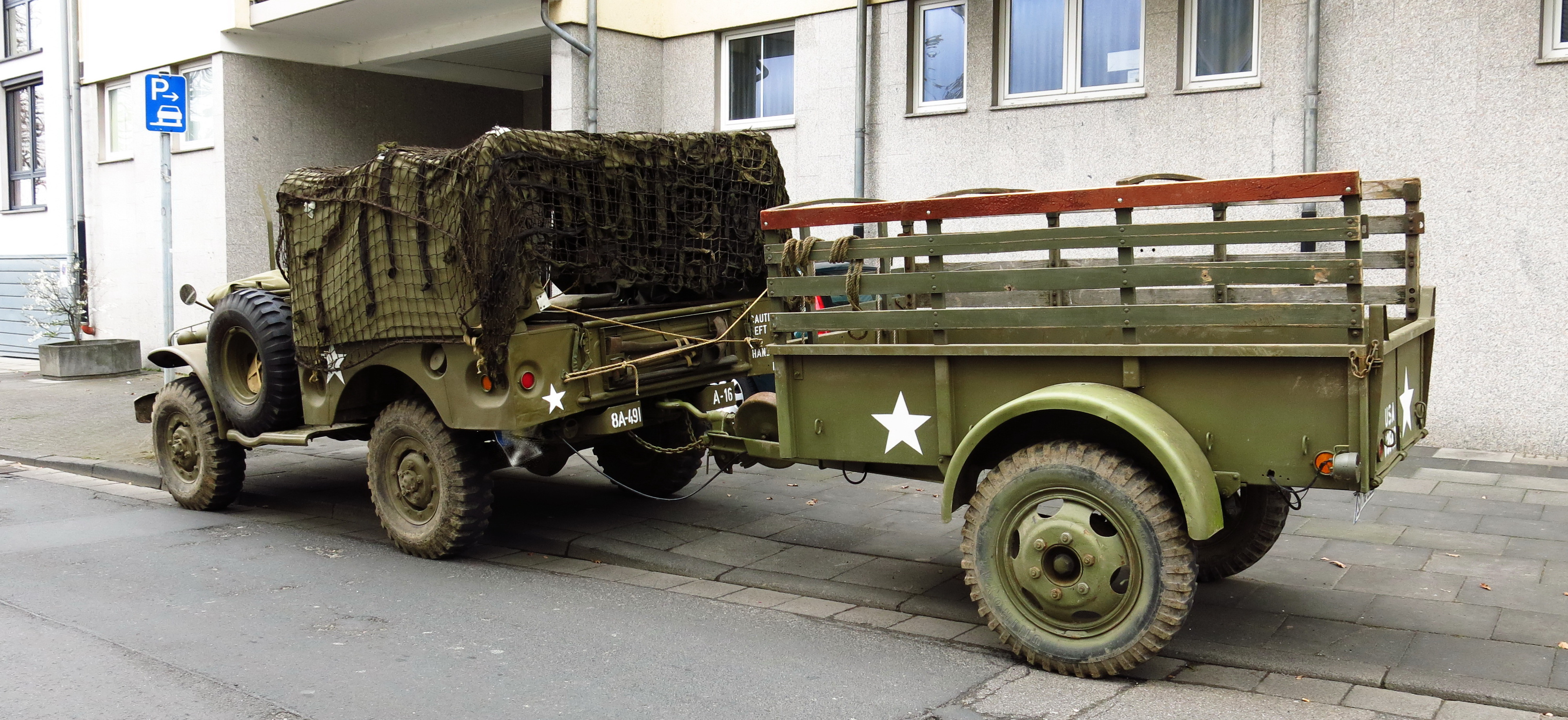
The "Ben Hur" 1-ton, 2-wheel cargo-trailer was frequently mated to the WC series trucks.

The Dodge WC series, nicknamed "Beeps", (Note: Contraction of "Big jeeps", in use from ca. 1943, when most people started calling the later Willys / Ford 1/4‑ton reconnaissance cars "jeeps", both caused by the media's usage, and by Willys' advertizing (since 1942), boasting they (alone) had created these, and their filing to trademark the "Jeep" name for them, in 1943.) and at first (from 1940 to 1942) nicknamed jeeps, (Note: predominantly the G‑505 half-ton models) (Note: For clarity, this article therefore avoids simply speaking of "jeeps", but will often use "1/4‑ton" or "quarter‑ton jeeps", where those are intended.) is a prolific range of light 4WD and medium 6WD military utility trucks produced by Chrysler under the Dodge and Fargo marques during World War II. (Note: Although within the Chrysler Corporation, the Fargo Division often handled government contracts, the trucks were all built at Dodge’s Mound Road, Warren truck plant near Detroit, Michigan.) Together with the later 1/4‑ton jeeps produced by Willys and Ford, the Dodge 1/2‑ton G-505 and 3/4‑ton G-502 trucks made up nearly all of the light 4WD trucks supplied to the U.S. military in WW II – with Dodge contributing some 337,500 4WD units (Note: Including the 4,640 G-505 VC trucks of 1940) (over half as many as the 1/4‑ton jeeps). (Note: The U.S. Army in WW II grouped motor transport vehicles into four payload classes — 3/4‑ton or one-ton and under were "light" trucks; 1 1/2‑tons were "medium", and above that were two classes of "heavy" trucks.)

Contrary to the versatility of the highly standardized 1/4‑ton jeeps, which was mostly achieved through field modification, the Dodge WC‑series came in many different, purpose-built, but mechanically uniform variants from the factory, much akin to the later family of High Mobility Multipurpose Wheeled Vehicles. The WC series evolved out of, and was part of a more extended family of trucks, with great mechanical parts commonality, that included open- and closed-cab cargo, troops and weapons carriers, (radio) command, and reconnaissance cars, ambulances, carry-alls, panel vans, and mobile telephone installation and (emergency) field workshop trucks.

The Dodge WC series were essentially built in two generations. From 1940 to early 1942, almost 82,400 of the 1/2‑ton 4×4 Dodge trucks were built. Initially called the VC series (for 1940), these were the U.S. military's first ever "light" four-wheel drive, (pre)-production trucks, (Note: Until then, all 4‑wheel drive trucks, procured by any U.S. military force, foremost the U.S.Army, which already bought over ten-thousand 4WD trucks during and after World War I, were at least 1 1/2-ton off-road payload rated "medium" trucks, and 3-ton and 5-ton rated "heavy" trucks.) — preceding a momentous 1940 rethink, leading to the creation of a new "1/4-ton truck" class. However, the great majority, from the 1941 model year, were named WC series, and built in more variants. Contrary to what Dodge's nomenclature maybe suggested, the 1941 WC models were a straight evolution of the 1940 VC models, retaining their G-505 U.S. Army Ordnance Corps' Supply Catalog number.

For 1942, the trucks bodies and chassis were largely redesigned – heavier frames and drivetrains uprated them to carry 3/4‑tons off-road. And widening their tracks, while greatly shortening the wheelbase on the main models, plus lowering the bodies' center of gravity, gave them a much more square stance, with a much better break-over angle and side-slope stability. The trucks thus became the shorter G-502, 3/4‑ton, 4×4 truck (Dodge), and from 1943 also the longer, stretched G-507, 1 1/2‑ton, 6×6 personnel and cargo truck (Dodge) — all while retaining Dodge WC model codes. Although the 3/4‑tons improvements meant substantial design changes, they did retain some 80% interchangeable components and service parts with the 1/2‑ton models — a vital Army requirement, for field maintenance and inter-operability of the trucks.

Dodge was the U.S. Army's main supplier of 1/2‑ton trucks, and its sole supplier of both 3/4‑ton trucks and 1 1/2‑ton 6×6 trucks in World War II. With over a quarter million units built through August 1945, the G-502 3/4‑tons were the most common variants in the WC‑series.
After the war, Dodge developed the 3/4-ton WC‑series into the civilian 4×4 Dodge Power Wagon; and in 1951, the WCs were replaced by the very similar 3/4‑ton 4×4 Dodge M-series vehicles .

Though the majority of Dodges built were 'Weapons Carriers', "WC" was not abbreviated from this, but a regular Dodge model code – initially "W" for 1941, and "C" for a nominal half-ton payload rating. (Note: When misunderstood, this leads for instance to the series being called "..the Dodge Weapons Carrier line of vehicles..") However, the "WC" model code was simply retained after 1941 — for both the 3/4-ton, as well as the 1 1/2‑ton rated 6×6 Dodges.
All in all, not counting mechanically related variants, the WC series alone involved 52 model versions (thirty 1/2‑ton 4×4, eight 1/2‑ton 4×2, twelve 3/4‑ton 4×4, and two 1 1/2‑ton 6×6 models). Creating vehicles of a common platform in such a variety of designs, with payloads ranging from 1/2‑ton to 1 1/2‑tons, had no equal in its time, and is seen as an extraordinary feat of the WWII American auto industry.

== Scope of the Dodge WC series ==
The name of this article would at first suggest a focus on models that are indeed called Dodge WC-numbers, either 4×4 or 6×6. However, the U.S. Army Ordnance Corps' central Standard Nomenclature List (SNL) Supply Catalog, covering the WC series, conveys both by its title, "SNL G-657 – Master Parts List, Dodge Trucks", as well as by the explicit types list on its second page, that (because of the large amount of shared parts and components), the family of vehicles must at least be considered to include the:

- 1940 half-ton (T-202) VC series and 1 1/2-ton (T-203) VF models
- 1941 half-ton (T-207, T-211, and T-215) WC series
- 1942 (T-214) three-quarter ton and 1943 (T-223) 1 1/2-ton WC series, but also
- 1941 two-wheel drive (T-112) half-tons and (T-118) 1 1/2-ton WC series.

Additionally, close variants of the T-207 WC-1, and of the T-214 WC-51/WC-52, were derived and made in Canada, as the T‑212 'D8A' and the T‑236 '3/4 Ton APT' (for 'Air PorTable') respectively; and further production of T-203 variants became indicated as both the T-203B, and as the WF series.

By contrast, Chrysler / Dodge Canada built another 165,000 mostly three-ton trucks, a hasty addition to the production of Canadian Military Pattern trucks, that were more closely derived from the commercial Dodge T-, V-, and W-Series trucks, and the same is true for the 15,000 'parts bin special' (T-234) "Burma Road" trucks, ordered by Chinese leader Chiang Kai-shek, at the time an ally against Japan.

== History and design ==
=== 1900–1939 — Dodge Brothers start making cars and 4×4 trucks for the U.S. Army ===
Dodge had been the United States military's primary supplier of light wheeled vehicles, since before the U.S. joined the First World War. After starting business in 1900, producing precision engine and chassis components for other car builders in Detroit — Ford and Oldsmobile chief among these — Dodge introduced their first car, the Model 30/35 tourer, in 1914. It was stronger and more high quality than the ubiquitous Ford Model T, and in 1916, Dodge cars immediately proved their durability, both in the 1910s U.S.–Mexico Border War — the U.S. military's first operation to use truck convoys, as well as in World War I, when some 12,800 Dodge cars and light trucks were used, primarily as ambulances and repair trucks., but also as staff and reconnaissance vehicles. All the while, Dodge maintained its reputation for high quality truck, transmission, and motor parts they kept making for other successful manufacturers.

Dodge civilian, commercial trucks were at first largely based on their passenger cars, offering light- and medium-duty trucks, like pick‑ups, station hacks, panel vans, and carry-alls. Dodge's passenger-car chassis were sturdy enough for such trucks, from their 1914 introduction. But Dodge expanded into medium-heavy duty trucks during the later 1930s and the 1940s. Crucial developments for Dodge were the switch to specific truck-frames and bodies in 1935, for a new, 1936 model-year truck generation. The dedicated truck frames were heavier and stronger than the lighter passenger-car chassis. In 1938, Dodge opened a very large new factory, dedicated to truck manufacturing, and later that same year, Dodge introduced a drastically redesigned new truck line-up again: the 1939 T-series 'Job-rated' trucks.

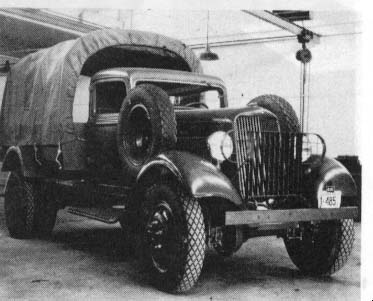
1934 K-39-X-4(USA) – Dodge's first military 4×4 truck

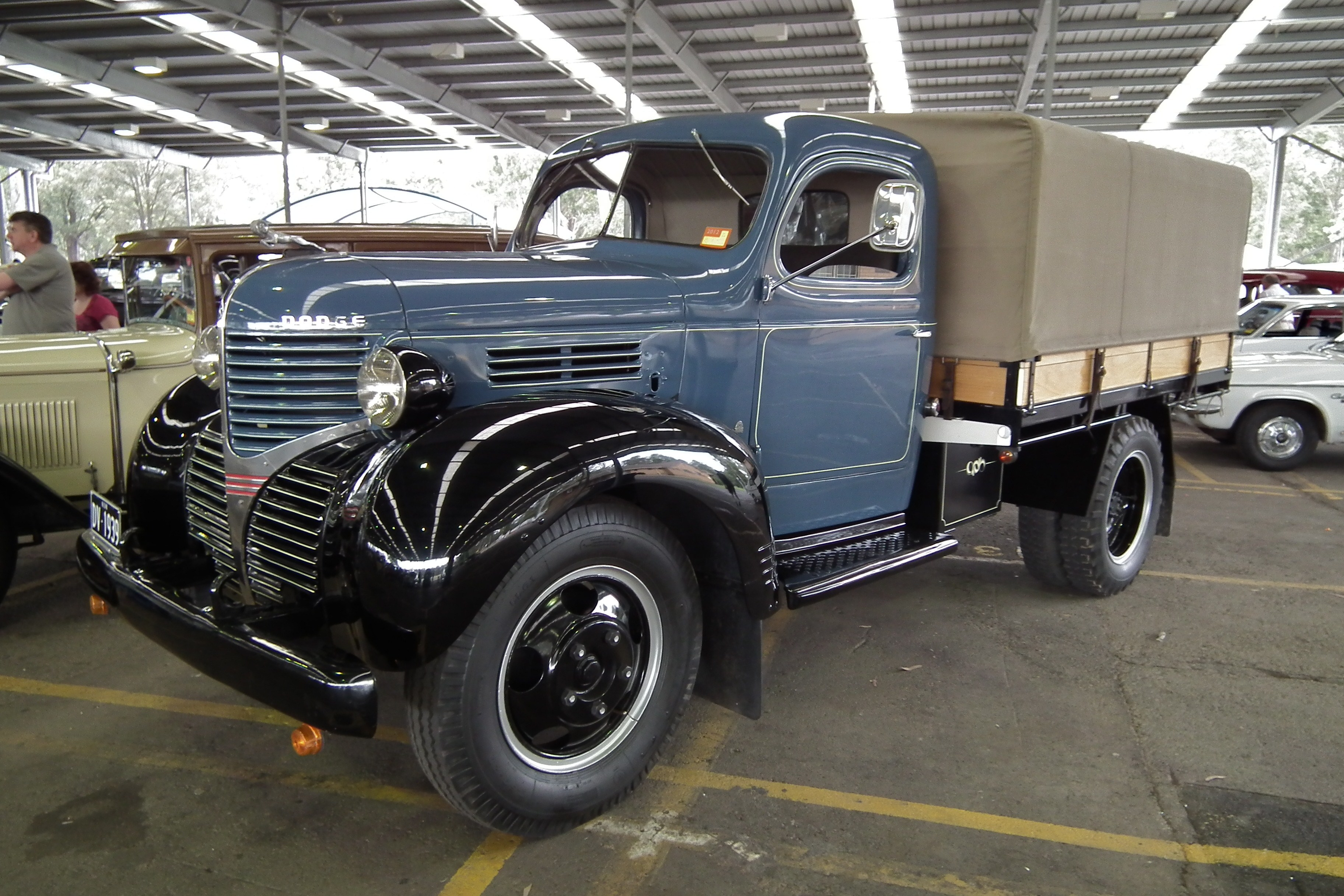
The initial Dodge VC-series, half-ton military 4×4s, were based on the 1939 T-series like this

Dodge developed their first four-wheel drive truck in 1934, requested by the U.S. Army — an experimental 1 1/2 ton rated model, designated K-39-X-4(USA), (Note: With 'X' indicating their experimental status, as well as "X-4" denoting the addition of four-wheel drive as their experimental feature, and '(USA)' for a government/military contract) of which 796 units were ordered, in multiple configurations. Timken supplied driven front axles and transfer-cases, which were added to a militarized commercial truck. The Timken transfer case was the first part-time design, that allowed the driver to engage or disengage four-wheel drive using a lever inside the cabin. In spite of the limited 1930s U.S. military budgets, the 1934 trucks served well enough that, after a couple of years, Dodge received further Army contracts for 1 1/2‑ton, 4-wheel drive trucks, and these were further developed from the late thirties. Dodge built the U.S. Army further batches of 1 1/2‑ton 4×4 trucks in 1938, 1939 and 1940.

In 1938, a batch of 1,700 experimental RF-40-X-4(USA) trucks were procured, and a further 292 experimental units, typed TF-40-X-4(USA) in 1939 – the first to be built, based on Dodge's new for 1939 T-, V-, and W-Series trucks. All of the 1 1/2-ton Army 4×4s, including the 800 trucks of 1934, rode on a 143 in (3.63 m) wheelbase, and the 1938 RF-40 and 1939 TF-40 four-wheel drives were the first for which Dodge moved to separate engineering codes, in the T-200 range (T-200 and T-201 respectively).

However, Dodge also eagerly pursued military contracts for half-ton four-by-fours at the same time. The smaller size had outperformed the 1 1/2-ton 4×4 during testing in 1938, and Dodge had invested greatly in half- to one-ton trucks in prior years. In 1936, Dodge's light, car-based trucks had been crucially redesigned — abandoning the use of passenger car frames, instead for the first time built on distinct, modern truck-style chassis, with the frame-rails welded to the cross-members on their half-ton to one-ton rated trucks. Additionally, Dodge had built their all new, very large Warren Truck Assembly plant in Michigan, specifically for mass-production of light and medium trucks, opened in 1938.

Then, for the 1939 model year, Dodge again presented a completely redesigned line of pickups and trucks – the art-deco styled, Dodge T-, V-, and W-Series "Job-Rated" trucks, available in an unprecedented number of sizes, payload rates and configurations, aiming the trucks to fit every different job.

=== 1940 — 1/2-ton VC and 1 1/2-ton VF models ===
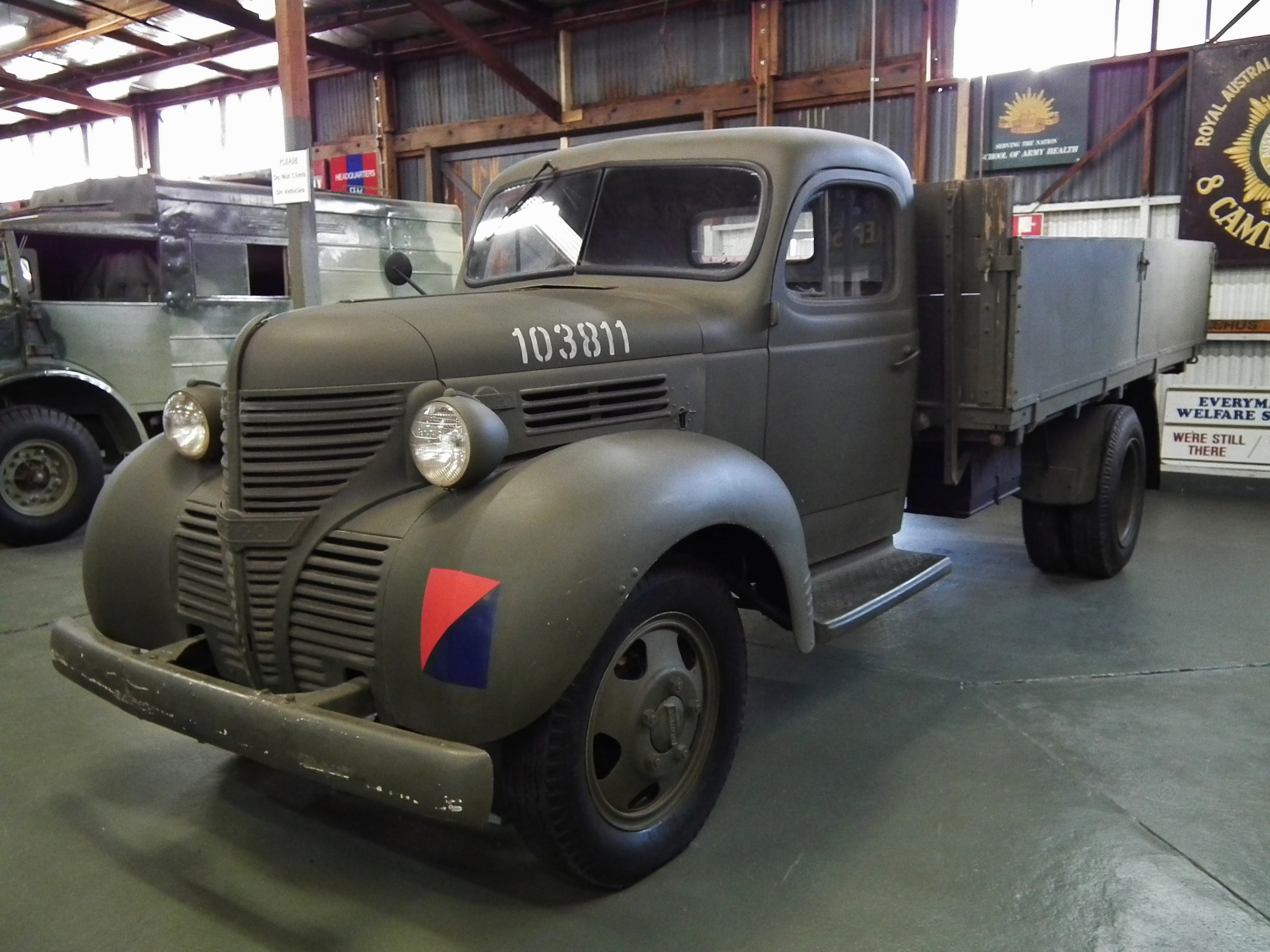
1940 Fargo-badged truck at the Australian Army History Unit museum.

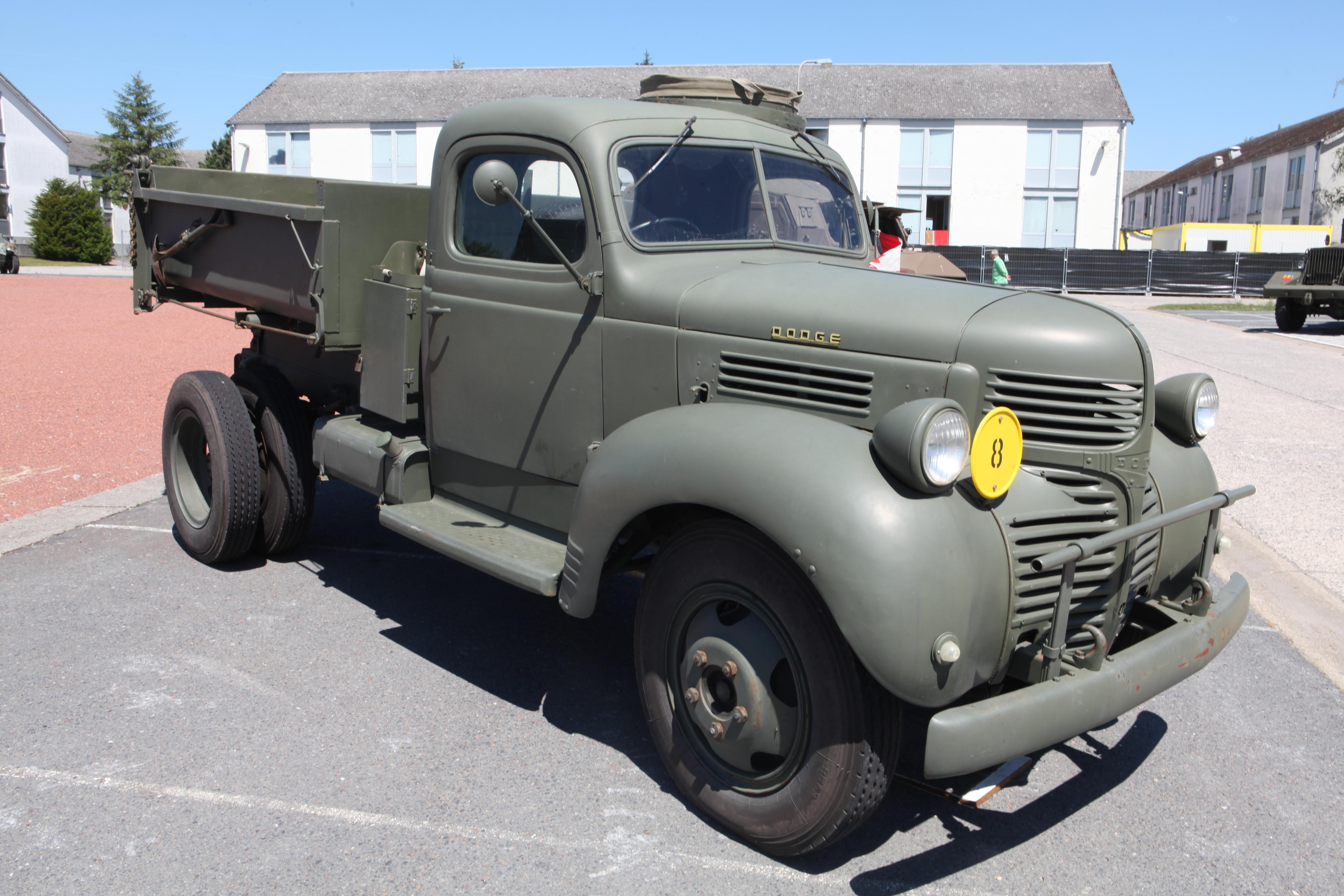
Dodge D15 Canadian Military Pattern truck, shared much with the 1940 VC-series.

Well before the onset of World War II, it was clear that the USA needed to update its military. The Quartermaster Corps (Q.C.), responsible at the time for providing the military with non-combat vehicles, moved to standardize truck designs, and by 1939, as the war in Europe erupted, the Army had settled on five payload-based general-purpose, cross-country truck classes: 1/2-ton, 1 1/2-ton, 2 1/2-, 4- and 7 1/2-ton. Introduction of a 1/2‑ton standard 4WD class meant a significant doctrine shift, away from the conventional belief that all the extra weight, costs and mechanical complexity of adding 4-wheel-drive wouldn't be worth it on any general purpose military vehicle with an off-highway payload capacity, below the (up to that point) standard 1 1/2‑ton Army cargo unit. Mirroring the civilian market, where the use of all-wheel drive was practically non-existent in anything below 1 1/2-ton payload vehicles. Light-duty off-roaders were a very small niche-market, only filled by after-market conversions, primarily by Marmon-Herrington.

By June 1940 the Q.C. had tested and approved its first three standard commercial based, all-wheel drive trucks: the 1 1/2-ton 4×4 Dodge, the GMC 2 1/2-ton 6×6 and a Mack 6-ton 6×6. With regards to Dodge however, the U.S. military reconsidered its preferences for the build-up for the war almost immediately after this.

Although in 1936, a Marmon-Herrington converted half-ton Ford had become the Army's first light 4-wheel drive, and the Army had initially standardized Dodge's 4×4 trucks in the 1 1/2-ton class — following Dodge's push for building 1/2‑tons, after mid 1940 the Army decided they preferred Dodge to build the light-duty four-wheel drives, contracting for a series of half-ton trucks, while GM / Chevrolet was instead going to become the standard supplier for 1 1/2-ton trucks. Dodge successfully outbid GMC's 1939 ACK-101 half-ton truck, as well as Marmon-Herrington, who could not retrofit in the required volume or price, not to mention International's M-1-4 half-ton truck, which wasn't built until 1941, for the U.S. Marine Corps. So, when in the summer of 1940 the largest government truck contract awarded went to Chrysler's Dodge / Fargo Division, for more than 14,000 (mostly) 4×4 trucks, this was in the midst of the transition, and thus included both orders for 1/2‑ton and 1 1/2‑ton trucks, as GM / Chevy still needed to tool up for mass-producing 4WD 1 1/2-tonners.

Dodge had started developing designs for a 4×4 half-ton in 1939, and began production in earnest in 1940 — both 4×4 half-tons, as well as 1 1/2-ton 4×4 and 4×2 trucks. On all 1940 trucks, front sheetmetal was mostly identical to the commercial VC and VF models of that year, with the addition of a big brush guard mounted in front of the grille and headlights. Except for the addition of 4-wheel drive, and custom bodies on the 1/2‑ton command cars, the trucks followed the 1939 procurement doctrine, to "use commercial trucks with only a few modifications such as brush guards and towing pintles to fit them for military use."

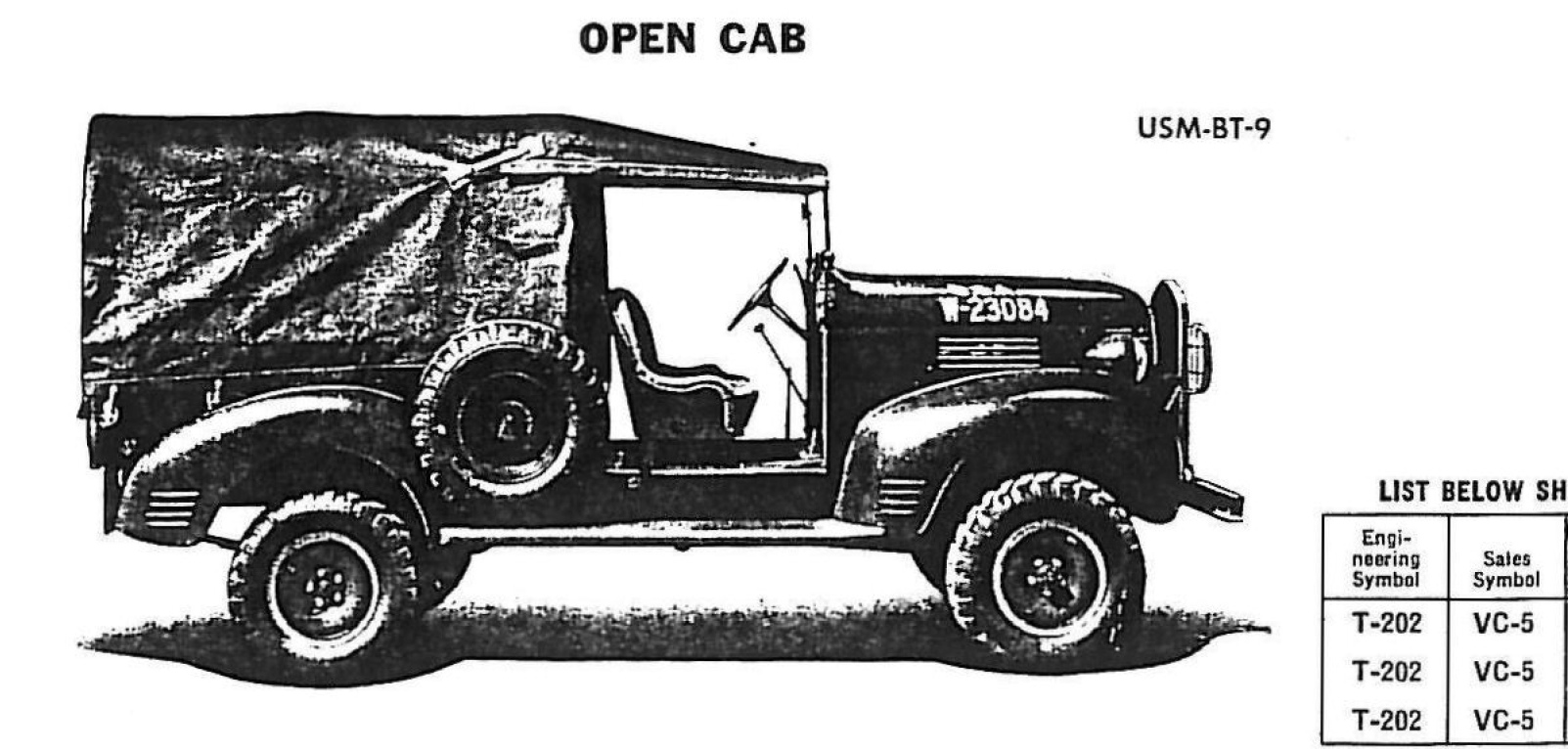
1940 Dodge VC-5 Open Cab pickup. The classic, pre-war bucket seats attempted to keep occupants on board, prior to the introduction of seat belts.

The first of the 1/2-ton, 4×4, VC series military trucks were based on Dodge's 1939 commercial, one-ton rated model TC-series. The military VC models kept the same wheelbase and got the same civilian engine upgrade for 1940, but gained four-wheel drive, and a new internal technical code: T-202. Manufacturing of the half-ton Dodge VC-models (SNL number G-505) began in 1940, making these the U.S. Army's first ever light-duty, mass-produced 4-wheel drive trucks. The soldiers also called the light command reconnaissance vehicles "jeeps," but this was also common with several other vehicles at the time. — before that term migrated to the quarter-tons, starting gradually in 1941.

A total of 4,640 VC models were built across six variants – mostly pick-ups and reconnaissance cars. On the one hand, these 1/2‑ton VC trucks proved so successful, that much greater quantities were immediately ordered, and they were further developed into the G-505, 1/2‑ton WC models built in 1941. On the other hand, an even lighter and smaller 4×4 truck was needed: a quarter-ton, that would soon replace the Dodges as the U.S.' lightest 4×4 military trucks. Although no longer standard, the VC trucks remained in use until the end of the war. The Dodge VC models were built a year ahead, and in a slightly greater number than any of the pre-standard quarter-ton jeeps that followed.

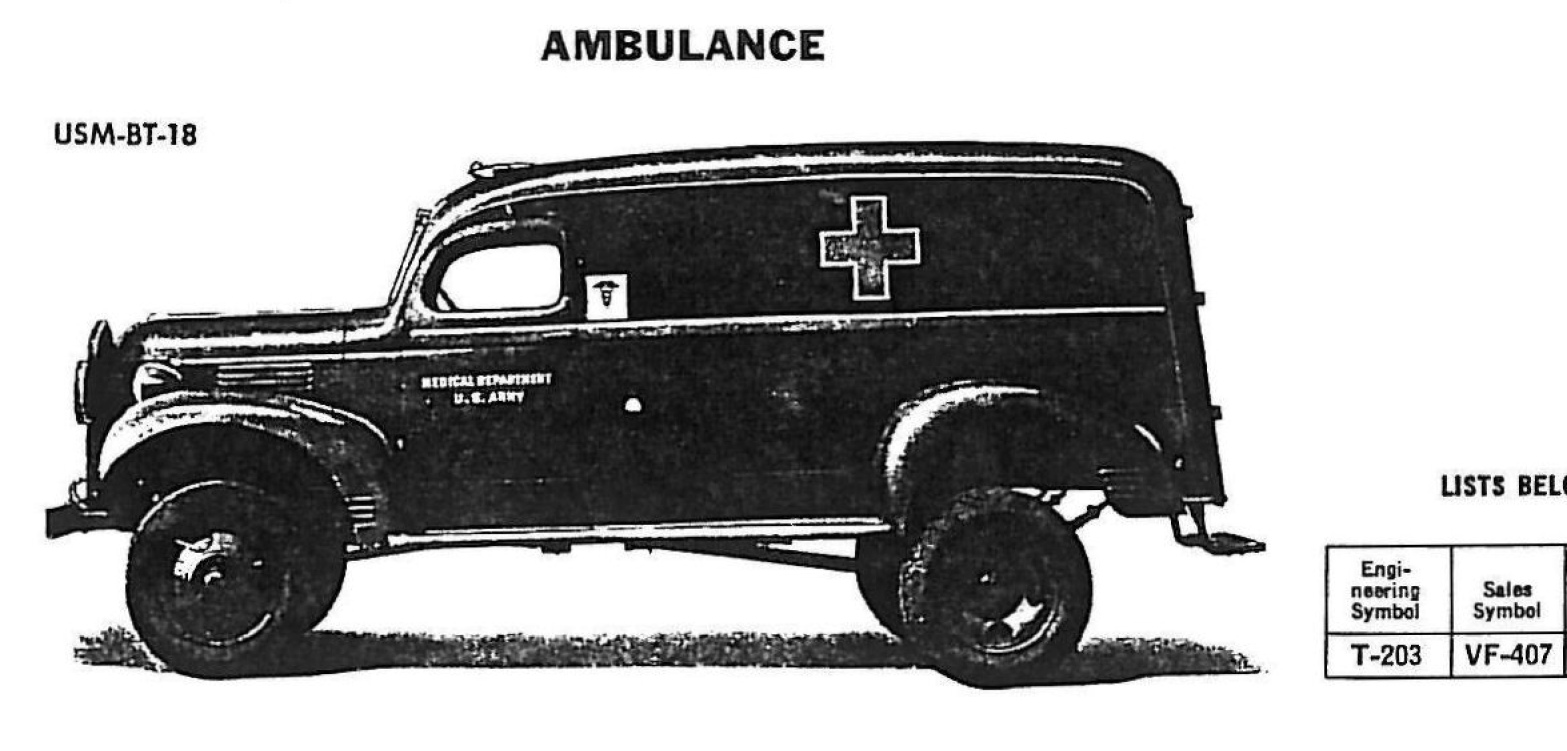
The 1/2-ton VC-series didn't include an ambulance, but the 1 1/2-ton VF-series did. The VF-407 was Dodge's first 4×4 military ambulance — only 3 were made.

In 1940, Dodge also built 6,472 four-wheel drive 1 1/2-ton trucks, under two U.S. contracts – one awarded to Dodge, and one to Fargo. (Note: Chrysler Corp. Mopar's 1946 annual model chart and serial number guide indicates 6,472 serial numbers across the VF-400 models, exactly matching Dodge's contract W-398-QM-7471 for 3,936 units, and Fargo's contract W-398-QM-7813 for 2,534 units, plus one pilot truck each. The 1946 Summary Report of Acceptances – Tank-Automotive Materiel lists another 292 cargo trucks in addition to these same numbers – but under earlier contracts, matching the 292 TF-40(-X) / T‑201 pre-standard units from 1939.) The models VF-401 to VF-407 (or engine/tech type T-203 by Dodge – and G-621 by the Army), were a continuation of their experimental pre-war predecessors, the RF-40(-X) and TF-40(-X) (or T-200 / T-201), still riding on a chassis of the same 143 in (3.63 m) wheelbase. Production consisted of just over 6,000 closed cab, open bed cargo trucks, plus just under 400 dump-trucks.

Like on the 1/2-ton VC-series, the 1940 VF-400 1 1/2-ton models simply used civilian front sheet-metal, based on the 1939 commercial model TE-30 cab, with a brush-guard fitted in front of the grille and headlights — but with a Dodge developed front driving axle, directional, cross-country tires, and a military cargo body. Importantly, one thousand of the VF-400 series cargo trucks were equipped with a power take-off, gear-driven Braden model MU 10,000 lb (4,500 kg) capacity winch — a feature that was carried over on many of the subsequent 1/2-ton and 1 1/2-ton WC series models, directly from 1941. And although the light-duty WC models that followed, did not receive the VF-400's two-speed transfer cases, these did return on the 1 1/2-ton 6×6 trucks, the WC-62 and WC-63. An ambulance model, VF-407, was also designed, but only three units were built, likely experimental.

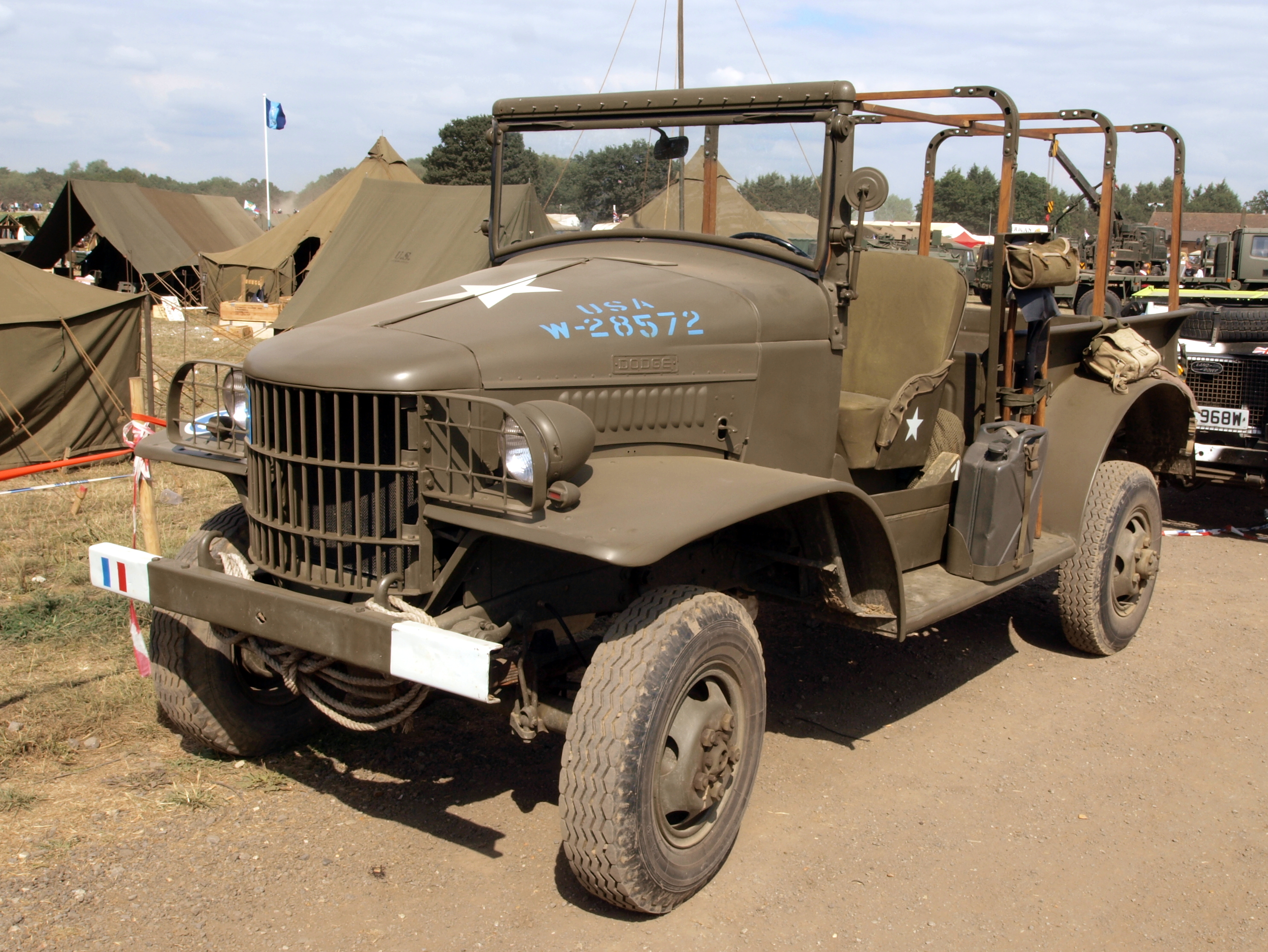
World War II soldiers called the 1/2-ton 1940/1941 Dodge Reconnaissance / Weapon Carriers a "Jeep" before the Willys MB.

These proved to be the last of Dodge's 1 1/2-ton 4×4 trucks for the war. Although the Army had steadily taken the bulk of its trucks in this category from Dodge / Fargo up til then, further production of 1 1/2-ton 4×4 trucks was instead awarded to GM's Chevrolet G506, which became the standard in this segment for the rest of the war.

Aside from four-wheel drive trucks, production started for a militarized commercial 1 1/2-ton, rear-wheel drive truck in 1940 — initially Dodge's model VF-31, cargo (engineering code T-98) under the government SNL number G-618. The 4×2 model VF-31 was succeeded by the model WF-31 (internally T-118) for 1941 (closed cab tractor) and 1942 (cab and chassis) — both on a 135 in (3.43 m) wheelbase — and the 1942 model WF-32, closed cab, stake and platform cargo truck, on a 160 in (4.06 m) wheelbase. After a modest production of 516 units of the WF-31, at least 9,500 Dodge WF-32 trucks were built, mostly for lend-lease to Russia.

External videos
- Dodge trucks in 1940 U.S. war promotion film
- "Army on Wheels" – WW II-era U.S. Army exercise stock film on Periscope Archives. Made by the U.S. War Department, together with Dodge, the May 1940 film opens with news of 7,000 new Dodge trucks for use by Uncle Sam (from 02:30) — showing VC and VF models. The four-wheel drive off-road capability, ruggedness, and the diverse uses for the vehicles are expounded, for instance: officers employ portable desks in their command cars to study maps and plot strategies (mark 13:00).

=== 1941–1942 — 1/2-ton WC series ===
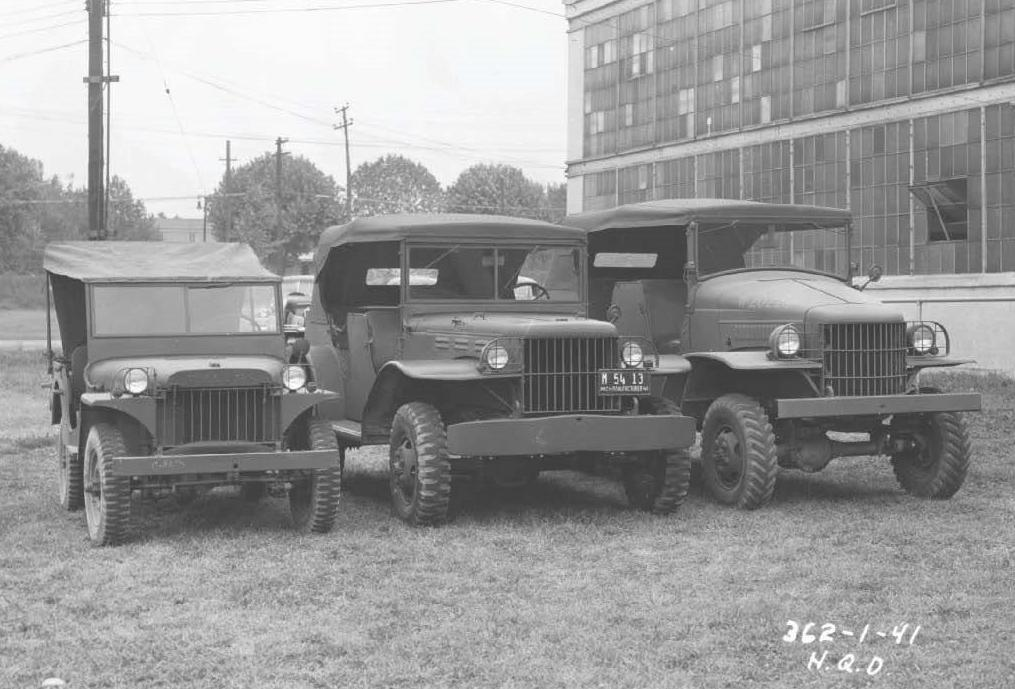
All three light U.S. 4×4 trucks, nicknamed 'jeeps' in World War II: a Willys 1/4‑ton, and Dodge 3/4‑ton and 1/2‑ton (L to R).

The 1940 VC-series Dodge 1/2-ton 4×4s were well liked but considered only an interim solution, because they were essentially a modified civilian truck. At the outset of World War II a more military design was laid out. Dodge evolved the 1940 VC‑1 to VC‑6 into the equally half-ton rated WC series of military light trucks, produced in 38 model variants, of which 30 were four-wheel driven, in varying amounts — thousands of some models were produced, while only a few of some others were made. Where the military VC‑series still used much civilian sheet-metal, distinguished by a brush-guard in front of the grille — the WC‑series came with wide-open, almost flat fenders that prevented mud build-up, clogging rotation of the wheels — as well as a redesigned, sloping nose with an integrated, round, grated grille / brush-guard. A new ambulance with a fully enclosed, all-steel box rear body was designed, on a longer, 123 inch wheelbase; and PTO-driven winches were now fitted to some models.

The 1/2‑ton WC models were the first all-military design Dodge developed in the build-up to full mobilization for World War II, and they were the U.S. Army's first standard light 4×4 trucks — prior to the quarter-tons — when the U.S. formally declared war in December 1941. Soldiers would sometimes call the new vehicles 'jeeps', as was still common practice before the term migrated to the yet to be introduced Willys and Ford 1/4-tons, and eventually stuck to those.

Both the Dodge half-ton VC and WC trucks were part of the Army G-505 series. Some 77,750 four-wheel drive 1/2‑ton WC numbered trucks were produced from late 1940 to early 1942, under War Department contracts. Additionally, aside from the fully military 4WD models, a small total of 1,542 two-wheel drive units retaining civilian sheet-metal were also supplied to the U.S. military, bearing WC model numbers in this same range. These models carried the SNL-code G-613, and brought the total number of half-ton WC‑series up to some 79,300 units, and the grand total of all half-tonners (VC and WC; 4WD and 2WD) to almost 84,000.

From August 1941, the Dodge T-211 models received the uprated 92 hp (gross) engine, that was from then on fitted to all WC trucks produced through August 1945: the T-215 half-tons, all of the G-502, 3/4-ton models, as well as the G-507, T-223, 6×6 trucks.

=== 1942–1945 — 3/4-ton, G-502 WC series ===
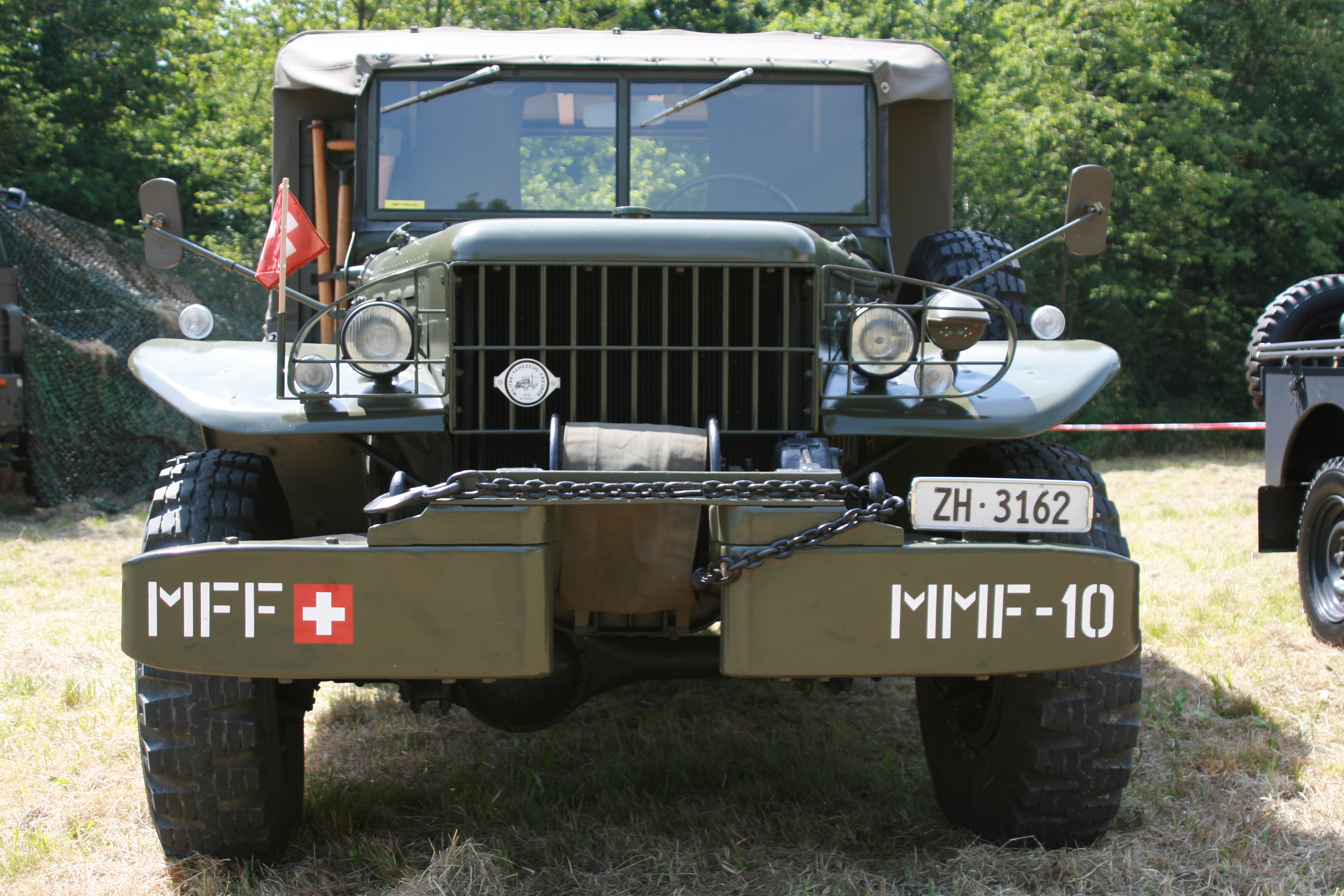
The 3/4-ton and 1 1/2-ton T-214 redesign gave the Dodge WC series a distinctly different look and proportions.

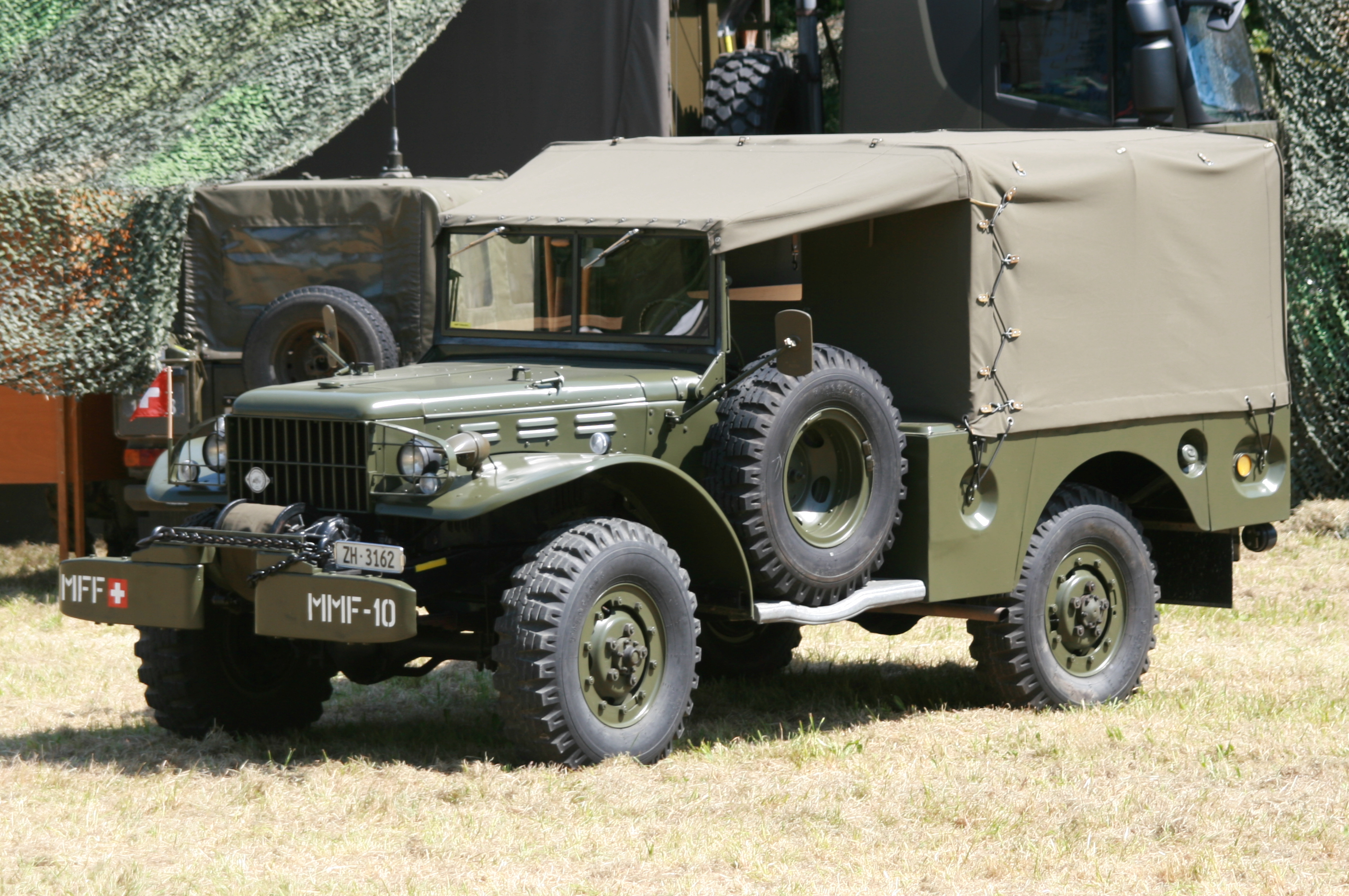

In 1940 the Army revised its range of standard, payload-based, general-purpose truck classes: a 1/4-ton "small truck" requirement was added, (these became famous as the WW II 'jeeps', after many other nicknames); and after buying over 80,000 1/2-ton trucks from Dodge, the U.S. Army instead wanted 3/4-ton rigs – and some more heavy categories were specified.

The Quartermaster General wanted to start direct negotiations with Dodge, GM and Mack for certain models immediately, but not until after February 1941 could the Quartermaster Corps choose manufacturers directly, based on their engineering and production capabilities. One deciding factor had to do with availability of certain critical components, like transfer cases and especially constant-velocity joints, not often used on commercial trucks until then, but all-wheel drive vehicles all needed these, to drive their front wheels smoothly. Additionally, all-wheel drive trucks needed two or three times the amount of driven axles, meaning more gears to cut for all the differentials. Produced until the war by a just a few specialized firms with limited capacity – from spring 1942, Ford, Dodge and Chevrolet joined in fabricating these in mass quantity, and Dodge were experienced in making quality, precision parts, since the earliest beginnings of the company.

While the Army bought many half-ton WC series trucks, Dodge had to replace them with new 3/4‑ton trucks. In late 1941, Dodge introduced a redesigned WC‑series of 4×4 trucks, uprated to 3/4‑ton off-road capacity, and their SNL code changed to G-502. The 3/4‑ton featured a lower profile truck bed that could seat eight troops, plus under seat stowage compartments; while service-parts remained 80 percent interchangeable with the existing 1/2‑ton series. Maintaining 80% service parts interchangeability with the 1/2‑ton models was of great value to both the field mechanics, and spare parts supply chain logistics. It also meant that production of the 3/4‑ton models could start very quickly, and they could be quickly deployed. The 1/2‑ton, G-505 WC‑trucks remained in various uses to the end of World War II – from 1943 as "limited standard" vehicles.

Throughout the war, Dodge was the U.S. Army's sole producer of 3/4‑ton trucks, and built a total of 255,193 of these, across all variants, from April 1942 to August 1945. Standard vehicles in the 3/4‑ton 4×4 class were the WC-51 / WC-52 Weapons Carrier, WC-56 /-57 /-58 (Radio) Command Reconnaissance, WC-53 Carry‑all, and the WC-54 Ambulance. In the mass-produced cargo/troop and command trucks, the WC-52 and WC-57 are identical to the WC-51 and WC-56, but have a longer frame, extending further forward to the protruding front bumper with front-mounted winch.

=== 1943–1945 — 3/4-ton, G-502 and 1 1/2-ton, 6×6, G-507 WC series ===
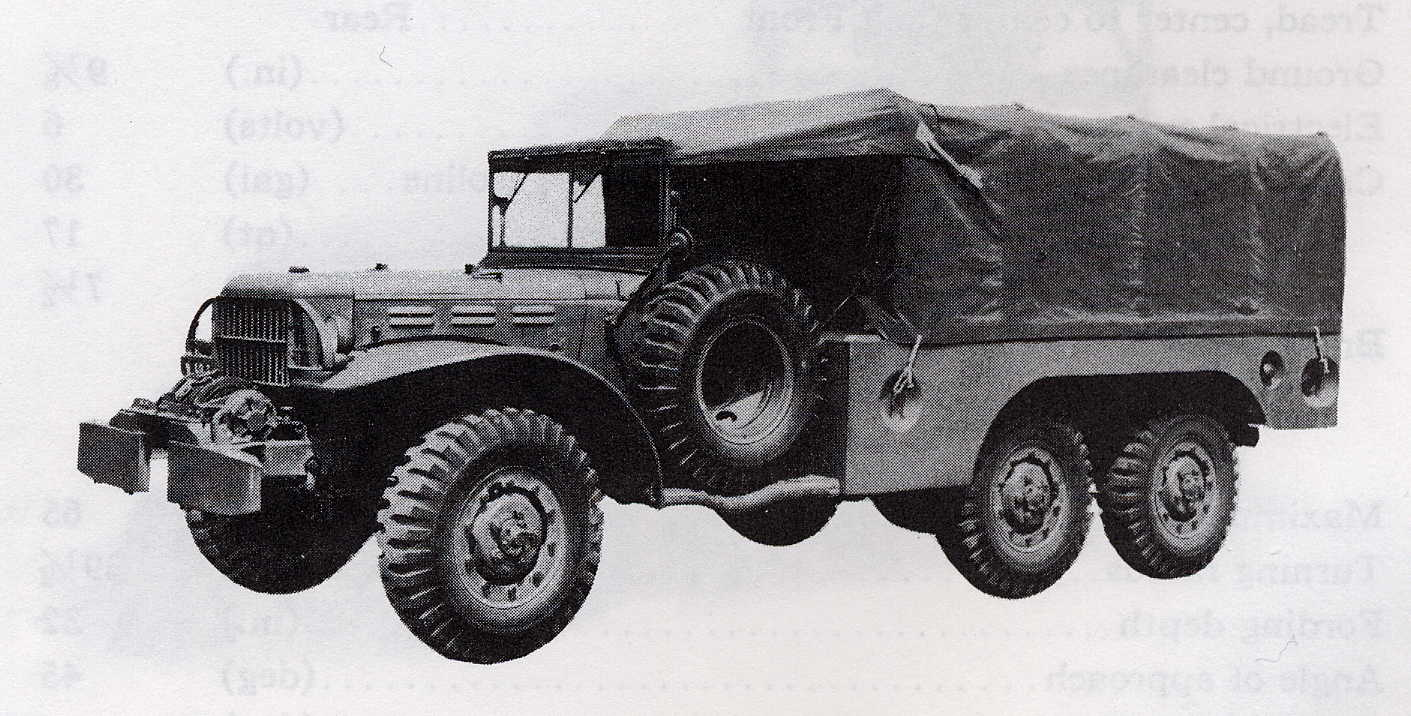
Stretching the G-502 (WC-51 / WC-52) cargo, troop, and weapon carriers with a third driven axle, produced the 1 1/2‑ton, 6×6, G-507, WC-62 and WC-63 w/winch (latter shown).

After the U.S. Army reorganized from using eight-troop rifle squads to twelve-men squads, a whole squad could no longer be carried as a unit in a single 3/4‑ton, 4×4, WC-51 or WC-52 truck. At the direction of Major General Courtney Hodges, Chief of Infantry, these G-502 troop- and weapons-carriers were therefore stretched in 1943, with an additional driven rear axle, to derive 48 in (1.22 m) longer 6-wheel drive, 1 1/2‑ton trucks.

Using the same engine, gearbox, and cockpit, and sharing much of the other mechanicals, plus near-identical front-half sheet-metal as the 3/4-tons, the new 6×6, G-507, 1 1/2‑tons' main difference was the use of a dual-range transfer-case, sourced out of the prior 1940, 1 1/2‑ton VF-400 models, instead of the single-speed box of the1/2-tons and 3/4-tons. The result were the WC-62 and WC-63 cargo, troop and weapons carriers, to move whole 12-troop squad teams per vehicle. Despite having individual drive-shafts from the transfer-case to each rear axle, there is no way to disengage one of the rear axles to achieve 6×2 drive. The G-507 runs in either 6×4 or 6×6 configuration.

The WC-63 was (just like the WC-52) equipped with a longer frame, housing an engine power take-off drive-shaft from the transfer-case forward, to drive a Braden MU2 winch, mounted on a 10 in (25 cm) more protruding front-bumper, reducing the approach angle. The winch capacity was originally rated at 5,000 lb (2,270 kg) pull-strength, but in late 1943 the wire rope size was upgraded from 3/8 in (9.5 mm) to 7/16 in (11 mm), the capacity rating was raised to 7,500 lb (3,400 kg), both on 3/4‑tons and the 6WDs.

The chassis and certain other components were strengthened in the design of the new, longer, double the payload rated models, and many of these changes were incorporated back into subsequent production of the 3/4-ton G-502 models as well. Although this caused some inconsistency in the mechanical uniformity of the 3/4-tons, it did keep parts the same as much as possible between the 3/4-tons and the new 1 1/2-tons, benefiting both the uniformity and ease of production of all the different models, as well as the 3/4‑tons, making them even more rugged from then on.

=== Further developments ===
Amphibious

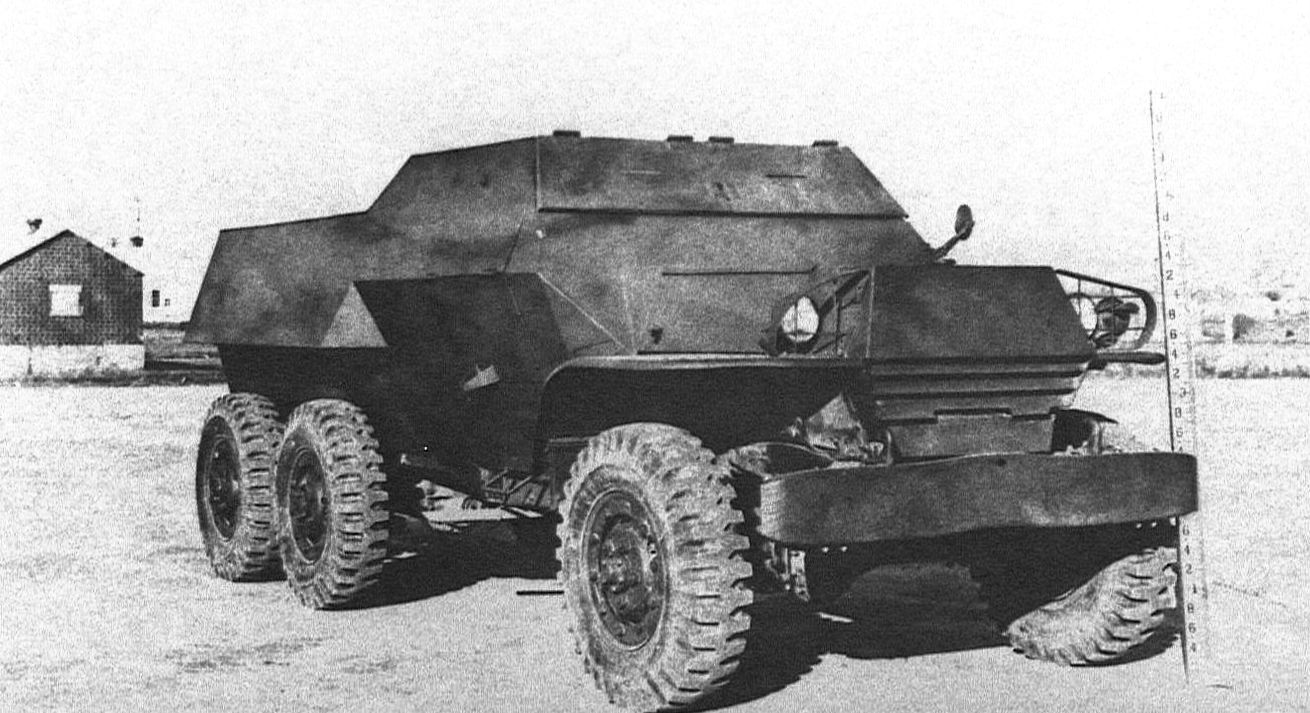
WC-62 armored car prototype (one built).

Twelve G-614 half-ton capacity, 4×4, XAC-2 / experimental 'Aqua-Cheetah', amphibious vehicles were built in 1942, by the Amphibian Car Corporation. One unit was submitted to Britain for testing, (under Lend-Lease), and the remaining eleven were subsequently rebuilt by the same firm, as G-552, XAC-3, amphibious 3/4‑ton trucks. Both the 1/2‑tons and the 3/4‑tons were built based on Dodge WC series mechanicals. The vehicles performed well in testing, but neither Britain nor the U.S. decided to standardize them.

Armored

A single armored car prototype was built, based on the 1 1/2‑ton, 6×6, Dodge WC-62.

== Models table – overview ==
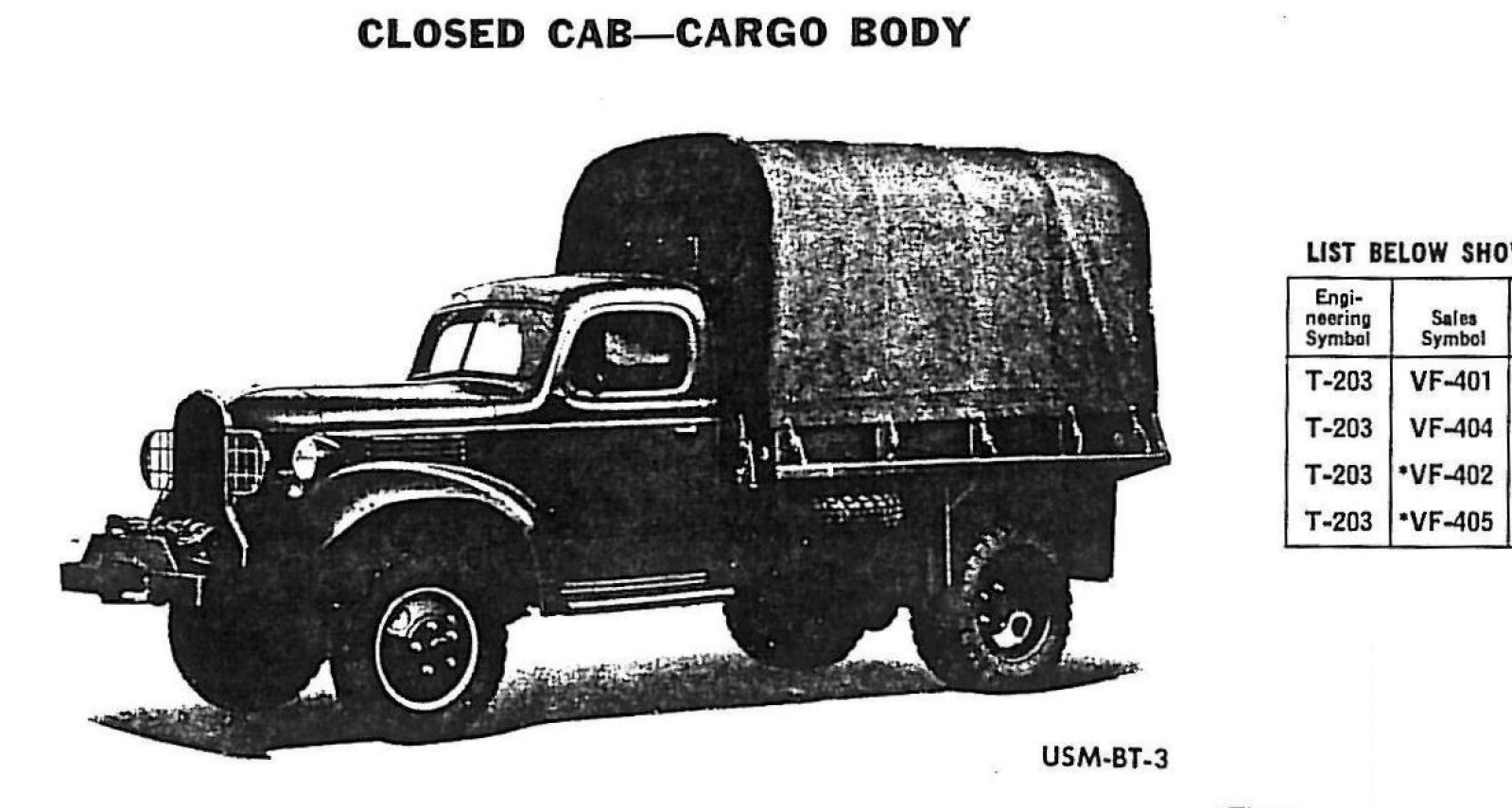
Dodge VF-401 /-402 /-404 /-405 closed cab cargo

External image
- Restored VF truck (archived)

This table provides the relations between U.S. military and Dodge identification numbers, related to chassis payload classification in U.S. tons (907 kg), wheels and drive, and description of body / vehicle type, in accordance with the U.S. Army Ordnance Standard Nomenclature List (SNL) vehicle catalog.

The U.S. government used vehicle (group) numbers starting with 'G-', whereas Dodge indicated models sharing the same technical configuration by a common 'T-' number, and their individual model numbers starting with two letters, like 'WC-'. The U.S. Army simply considered the 1941 half-ton Dodge WC series as evolutions of the initial 1940 VC series – all within the half-ton, 4×4, SNL G-505 truck range.

In the case of two model codes separated by a slash, the first code refers to the vehicle without a winch, and the second code, in bold print, to the same vehicle, on a longer front frame, holding a front winch, typically resulting in a 10 in (25 cm) longer front overhang, and distinctly reduced approach angle. Not only were the winches driven by a power take-off from the engine, but unlike the later Dodge M-series trucks, on which an extension was bolted to the frame when mounting a winch — on the WC‑series the winch equipped versions were actually built on a different, longer frame.

On the 1 1/2-ton rated VF-400 series trucks, the PTO-driven winch had a 10,000 pound capacity, but added almost 1,000 pounds to the vehicles weight, reducing the payload to 2400 pounds.

Numbers separated by a comma indicate similar models but with different secondary details.

| | 1/2-ton 4×4 – G-505 | | | | 1/2-ton 4×2 | 3/4-ton 4×4 – G-502 | 1 1/2-ton 4×4 | 1 1/2‑ton 4×2 | 1 1/2-ton 6×6 |
| | T-202 | T-207 | T-211 | T-215 | G-613 / T-112 | T-214 | G-621 / T-203 | G-618 / T-118 | G-507 / T-223 |
| Pick-up, closed cab, w. troop seats | VC-3 | WC-1 | WC-12 | | WC-38, WC-47 | | | | |
| Pick-up, closed cab, no rear seats | VC-4 | WC-5* | WC-14* | WC-40*, (WC-41**) | | | VF-401 / -402, VF-404 / -405 | | |
| Pick-up, open cab – cargo, troops, and weapons carriers | VC-5 | WC-3 / WC-4 | WC-13 | WC-21 / WC-22 | | WC-51 / WC-52 | | | WC-62 / WC-63 |
| Carry-all | VC-6 | WC-10 | WC-17 | WC-26 | WC-36, WC-48 | WC-53 | | | |
| Dump truck | | | | | | | VF-403, -406 | | |
| Command / Reconnaissance | VC-1 | WC-6 / WC-7 | WC-15 | WC-23 / WC-24 | | WC-56 / WC-57 | | | |
| Radio truck | VC-2 | WC-8 | WC-16 | WC-25, WC-42 | | WC-58, (WC-54) | | | |
| Panel Van | | WC-11 | WC-19 | WC-42 | WC-37, WC-49 | | | | |
| Emergency Repair / maintenance workshop | | WC-5* | WC-14*, WC-20 | WC-40*, WC-41** | | WC-60 | | | |
| Portee gun truck (Note: truck with bed-mounted gun, typically unarmored, except for possibly a gun shield) | | | | | | WC-55 | | | |
| Ambulance | | WC-9 | WC-18 | WC-27 | | WC-54, WC-64 (KD) | VF-407 | | |
| Telephone installation / maintenance | | | | WC-43 | WC-39, WC-50 | WC-59, WC-61 | | | |
| Closed cab, bare chassis | | | | | | | | WF-31 | |
| Closed cab, stake & platform | | | | | | | | WF-32 | |
| | * The WC-5, WC-14, and WC-40 were U.S. ordered, and accepted as 'Emergency Repair' – but by Dodge listed as 'pickup' built. ** 39 WC-41s were classed as G-505 trucks, but the remaining 306 units as G-061 Emergency Repair trucks | | | | | | | | |

== Engines and drivetrains ==
All engines were liquid-cooled, gasoline, straight-six Chrysler flathead engines. Recommended fuel octane rating for the initial T-207 WC half-tons was just 60–65, going by the dashboard data plate.

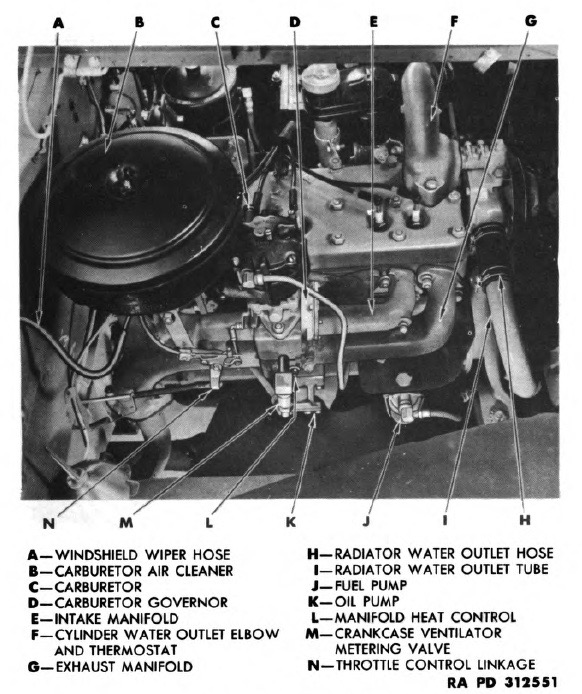
Dodge T-214 engine (TM photo)

The side-valve engines were mated to drive-trains of four-speed manual transmissions and a single-range transfer case, offering part-time four-wheel drive. Only the drive-trains in the 1 1/2‑ton models, the 1940 T‑203, VF-400 trucks, and the 1943–1945, G-507, T‑223 six-wheel drives, had a dual-ratio transfer-case. The low ratio on the 6×6, T‑223 transfer case gave a 1.5 : 1 reduction instead of the direct drive (1 : 1) high gear.

The first batch of 1940, small half-ton (G‑505) Dodge VC models, (Dodge code T‑202) received a 201 cu in (3.3 L), 79 horsepower engine, well above their initial commercial rating of 70 hp on the 1939 TC half-tons. The four-speed gearbox fitted, was a stock option on the civilian Dodges, and so were oil filters, oil-bath air cleaners, and heavy-duty generators. The 1941 model-year T‑207-series trucks were again classed as G-505 half-tons, but these were powered by a 218 cu in (3.6 L) straight-six of 85 hp, taken from Dodge's 3/4- and one-ton commercial trucks. When the 1941 WC models were updated to T‑211 specifications, they initially kept that engine – however, later T‑211s, and all of the final G‑505 half-ton WC series (the T‑215s), got a stronger 230 cu in (3.8 L) L-head of 92 hp (SAE gross).

From the mid 1941, T‑211 half-ton WC models onwards, to 1945, through the production of all 255,200 3/4‑ton T‑214 models, and the 43,200 1 1/2‑ton, T‑223, stretched six-wheel drive trucks, this 92 hp, 230 cu in (3.8 L) engine powered about 340,000 of all the Dodge WC series, basically unchanged.

| Tech. code | From | Block size | Bore | Stroke | Displacement | Compression | Torque | Power |
|---|---|---|---|---|---|---|---|---|
| T-112 | 1941 | 23 inch | 3 1/4 in (83 mm) | 4 3/8 in (111 mm) | 217.7 cu in (3,567 cm^{3}) | 6.8:1 | 170 lb⋅ft (230 N⋅m) @ 1200 rpm | 85 hp (63 kW) @ 3000 rpm |
| T-118 | 1941 | 25 inch | 3 7/16 in (87 mm) | 4 1/4 in (108 mm) | 236.6 cu in (3,877 cm^{3}) | | 190 lb⋅ft (258 N⋅m) @ 1500–2200 rpm | 104 hp (78 kW) @ 3000 rpm |
| T-202 | 1940 | 23 inch | 3 1/8 in (79 mm) | 4 3/8 in (111 mm) | 201.3 cu in (3,299 cm^{3}) | 6.7:1 | 154 lb⋅ft (209 N⋅m) | 79 hp (59 kW) @ 3000 rpm |
| T-203 | 1940 | 25 inch | 3 3/8 in (86 mm) | 4 1/2 in (114 mm) | 241.5 cu in (3,957 cm^{3}) | 6.5:1 | 188 lb⋅ft (255 N⋅m) @ 1200 rpm | 99 hp (74 kW) @ 3000 rpm |
| T-207 | late 1940 | 23 inch | 3 1/4 in (83 mm) | 4 3/8 in (111 mm) | 217.7 cu in (3,567 cm^{3}) | 6.5:1 | 170 lb⋅ft (230 N⋅m) @ 1200 rpm | 85 hp (63 kW) @ 3000 rpm |
| T-211 | 1941 | 23 inch | 3 1/4 in (83 mm) | 4 3/8 in (111 mm) | 217.7 cu in (3,567 cm^{3}) | 6.5:1 | 170 lb⋅ft (230 N⋅m) @ 1200 rpm | 85 hp (63 kW) @ 3000 rpm |
| T-211 from August 1941 | | 23 inch | 3 1/4 in (83 mm) | 4 5/8 in (117 mm) | 230.2 cu in (3,772 cm^{3}) | 6.7:1 | 180 lb⋅ft (244 N⋅m) @ 1200 rpm | 92 hp (69 kW) gross / 76 hp (57 kW) net @ 3200 rpm |
| T-214 | 1942 | 23 inch | 3 1/4 in (83 mm) | 4 5/8 in (117 mm) | 230.2 cu in (3,772 cm^{3}) | 6.7:1 | 180 lb⋅ft (244 N⋅m) @ 1200 rpm | 92 hp (69 kW) gross / 76 hp (57 kW) net @ 3200 rpm |
| T-215 | 1941 | 23 inch | 3 1/4 in (83 mm) | 4 5/8 in (117 mm) | 230.2 cu in (3,772 cm^{3}) | 6.7:1 | 180 lb⋅ft (244 N⋅m) @ 1200 rpm | 92 hp (69 kW) gross / 76 hp (57 kW) net @ 3200 rpm |
| T-223 | 1943 | 23 inch | 3 1/4 in (83 mm) | 4 5/8 in (117 mm) | 230.2 cu in (3,772 cm^{3}) | 6.7:1 | 180 lb⋅ft (244 N⋅m) @ 1200 rpm | 92 hp (69 kW) gross / 76 hp (57 kW) net @ 3200 rpm |
| T-236; Canadian | 1943 | 25 inch | 3 7/16 in (87 mm) | 4 1/4 in (108 mm) | 236.6 cu in (3,877 cm^{3}) | 6.8:1 | 182 lb⋅ft (247 N⋅m) @ 1300 rpm (gross) | 92.5 hp (69.0 kW) gross / 82.5 hp (61.5 kW) net @ 3200 rpm |

== Half-ton VC series ==
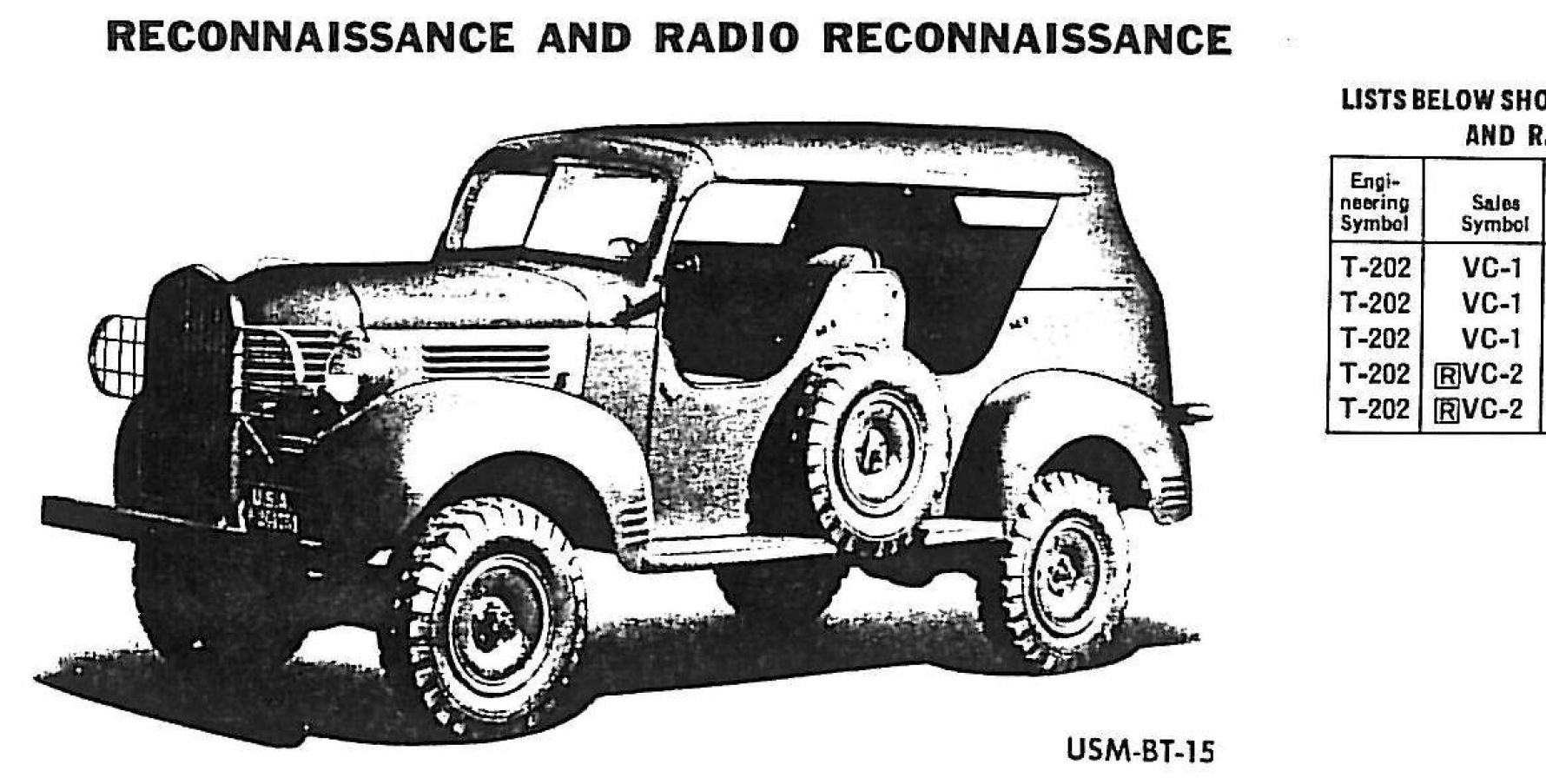
The 1940 Dodge VC-1 / VC-2 Radio and Command Reconnaissance cars had a new body by Budd.

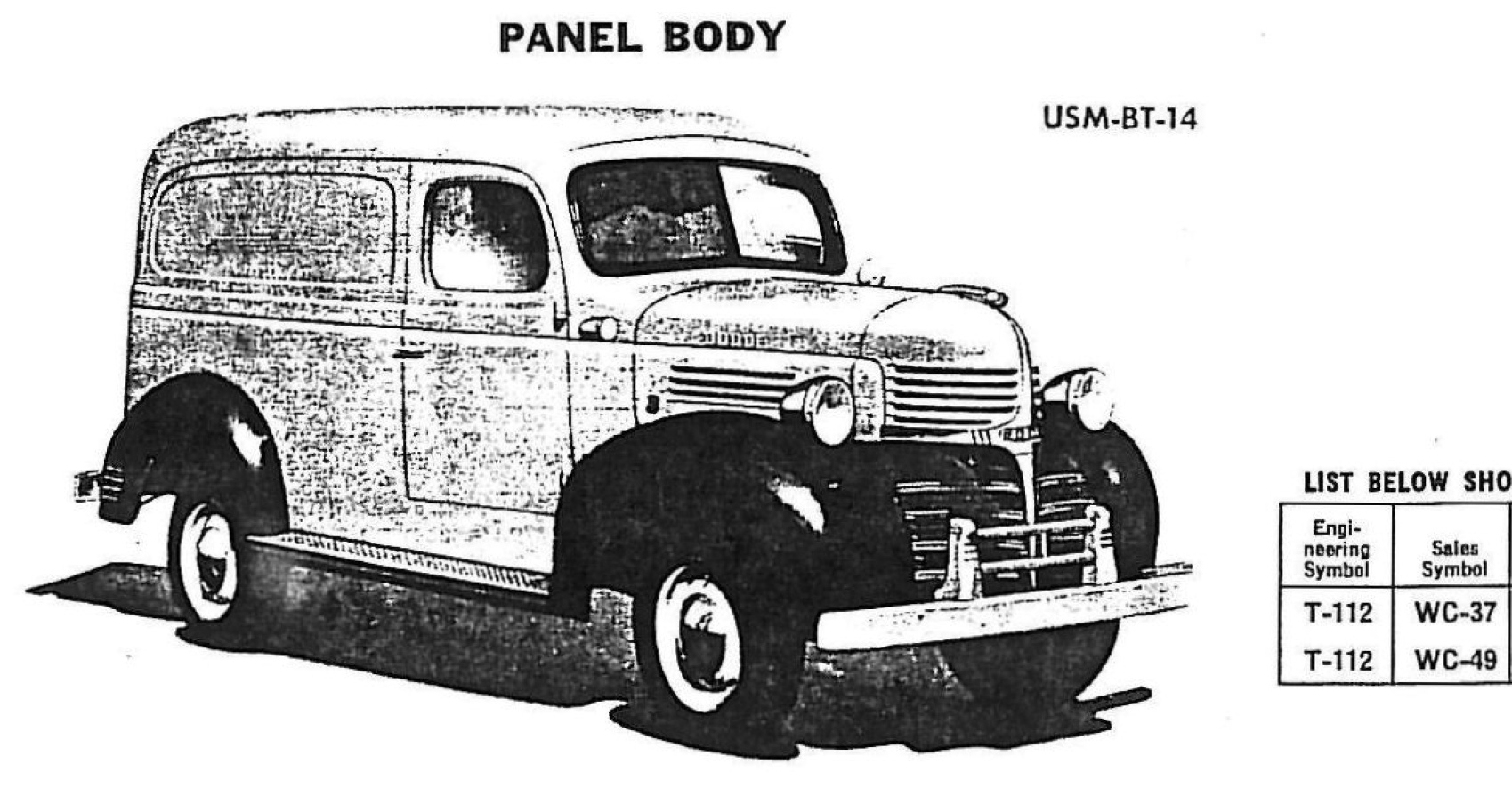
The 1940 VC-6 Carry-all used this 1940 civilian panel-van body – with windows all-around, 4-wheel drive, and a front brush-guard. For 1941, this art deco body was used again, on the 4×2 drive WC-36 & WC-48 carry-alls, and the WC-37 / WC-49 panel vans.

The 1940 Dodge / Fargo VC models formed the first production run in the U.S. military's G-505 range of half-ton, (Note: (nominal off-road payload rating)) light four-wheel drive trucks. Created by Chrysler, based on Dodge's lightest, new for 1939, commercial half-ton TC models of "express" pickups, (Note: Around 1939 / 1940, Dodge called their stepside pickups "express" – and so, in a number of early Army contracts for 1941 G‑505 trucks, the body-type was just specified as "express".) and their carry-all, the 1940 VC models formed the foundation for the subsequent 1941, G‑505, 1/2‑ton WC series trucks. (Dodge's naming system, back then, moved up the first letter alphabetically per model year, and the second letter tied to the truck's payload rating, based on chassis and components strength.)

All variants used the same 116 in (2.95 m) wheelbase as the shortest civilian trucks, but with the addition of part-time four-wheel drive. Bodywork and sheet metal on the military VC series pick-ups and carryall were the same as the civilian models — however, for the command reconnaissance and radio cars, a new, dedicated open five seater body was created, manufactured by Budd Company.

Also the same 201.3 cu in (3.3 L) inline six, flathead engine was used, but Dodge raised its power output from a 70 hp (52 kW) rating in the 1939 civilian TC, to 79 hp (59 kW) at 3000 rpm for their 1940 light VC models, and for the Army's G-505 VCs. The transmission had 4 speeds, and the transfer case just one – it only shifted drive to the front axle, to engage or disengage four-wheel drive. On-road, it remained rear-wheel drive, to prevent binding that would damage the drivetrain while cornering, as there was no center differential.

The G-505 half-ton VC series came in six variants, numbered VC-1 to VC-6, and internally T-202 by Dodge:

- VC-1: Command Reconnaissance car – 2,155 units
- VC-2: Radio Command Reconnaissance – 34 units
- VC-3: Closed cab Pickup with bed seating for troops – 816 units
- VC-4: Closed cab Pickup without bed seats – 4 units
- VC-5: Open cab Pickup with bed seating for troops – 1,607 units
- VC-6: Carry-all – 24 units

None of these trucks came with winches yet.

Delivered from early 1940 under a production contract, these 4,640 half-ton trucks were both the U.S. Army's first ever scale procurement of 'light' four-wheel drive vehicles – and their first light 4×4 trucks that military men called "jeeps" – as well as a part of Dodge's first official production contract for four-wheel drive trucks from the U.S. military. All prior sales, for the 1 1/2-ton trucks, although in the hundreds in 1934 and 1939, and even counting 1,700 in 1938, had been contracts for 'experimental' Army trucks.

== Half-ton WC series ==
The half-ton, 4×4, Dodge WC series were evolutionary redesigns of the preceding VC series, retaining the military G-505 series code. Starting production in late 1940, until replacement by the 3/4‑ton models in early 1942, they progressed through three mechanical engineering versions (T-207, T-211, and T-215), in barely a year and a half – while receiving the T-215 specification engine midway through production of the T-211 coded versions. Half-ton rated WC series models received thirty-eight numbers, roughly chronologically, in the WC-1 to WC-50 range, but skipping numbers WC-2, WC-28 to WC-35, and WC-44 to WC-46.

The WC series is immediately recognizable by its redesigned, now military sheet-metal. Wide-open, simplified front and rear fenders replaced the bulbous civilian ones, offering more wheel-travel, and less risk of wheels clogging stuck with thick mud in the wheel-well. The front brush-guard and grille were redesigned, replacing the civilian art-deco front with a single, integrated, upright, round welded grate.

The distribution across the versions was:

- 31,935 units of the WC-1 through WC-11 models, with the T-207 engineering code and a 217.7 cu in (3,567 cm^{3}) engine with 85 hp (63 kW);
- 17,293 units of the WC-12 through WC-20 models, with the T-211 engineering code and initially the same engine, however during August 1941 the T-211 engine was increased to 230.2 cu in (3,772 cm^{3}) and 92 hp (69 kW), but the overall T-code number was not changed on affected models (e.g. WC-18) (Note: U.S. government contracts explicitly referred to these units as T-211 models with a T-215 engine.)
- 28,537 units of the WC-21 through WC-27 and WC-40 through WC-43 model, with the T-215 engineering code and a 230.2 cu in (3,772 cm^{3}) engine with 92 HP.

The T-207 range had an uprated 85 hp engine, and these units had front axles with Bendix-Weiss constant-velocity joints, whereas T-211 and T-215 models were given front axles either made by Bendix or with Rzeppa design CV joints, made by Ford.

From the T-211 models onwards, the rear brakes were 14-inch (360 mm) instead of 11-inch (280 mm) drums. Among the T-211 versions, no single WC model number was explicitly used for winch-equipped units.

The T-215 types introduced a military design dashboard with round gauges, replacing the civilian dash with square ones.

A further 1,542 rear-wheel drive units (engineering code T-112) were built as WC-36 through WC-39, and WC-47 through WC-50 — mostly carry-alls and pick-ups). These retained civilian bodywork, fenders and grilles, as well as regular front axles, and a one-ton on-road rating.

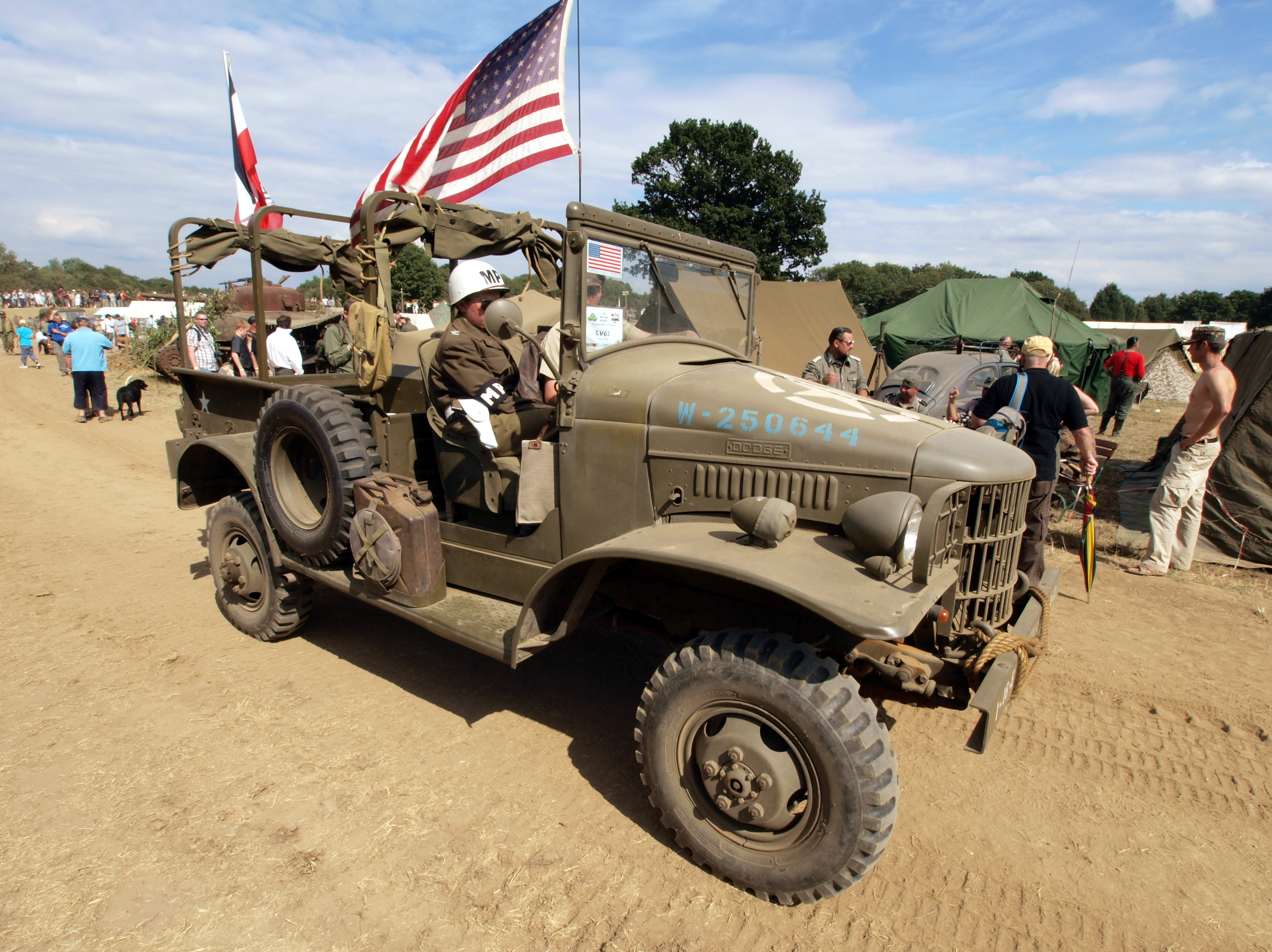
Open cab pickups/weapon carriers were the most numerous of the 1/2‑ton WC series

=== Common specifications ===
- Drive: four-wheel drive — except for WC-36 to WC-39 and WC-47 to WC-50
- Wheelbase: 116 in (2.95 m) – both on four-wheel and two-wheel drive models
  - except 123 in (3.12 m) for ambulances and phone line / emergency repair trucks
- Track width: front 59 3/8 in (1.51 m) and 61 3/8 in (1.56 m) rear
  - except just 55 3/4 in (1.42 m) front track on rear-wheel drive only models
- Tires: 7.50×16 in
- Brakes: Hydraulic
- Engine: 6 cylinder, in-line, side valve engine
- Transmission: manual, 4 forward / 1 reverse
- Transfer case: Single speed

=== 1/2-ton Ambulances ===
WC-9, WC-18, WC-27

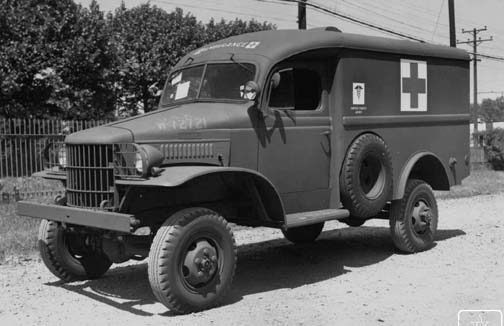
Dodge WC-9 Ambulance

Entering production during 1941 to early 1942, they were specifically designed to serve as military ambulances. These early variants are distinguishable from the later ones by having a curved radiator grille, while the later ones (WC-51 onwards) featured a flat grille. These versions were given a longer 123 in (3,100 mm) wheelbase.

- Length: 195 in (4.95 m)
- Width: 75 13/16 in (1.93 m)
- Height: 90 in (2.29 m)
- Weight: 5,340 lb (2,420 kg)
- Payload: 1,300 lb (590 kg)

=== 1/2-ton Carry-alls ===
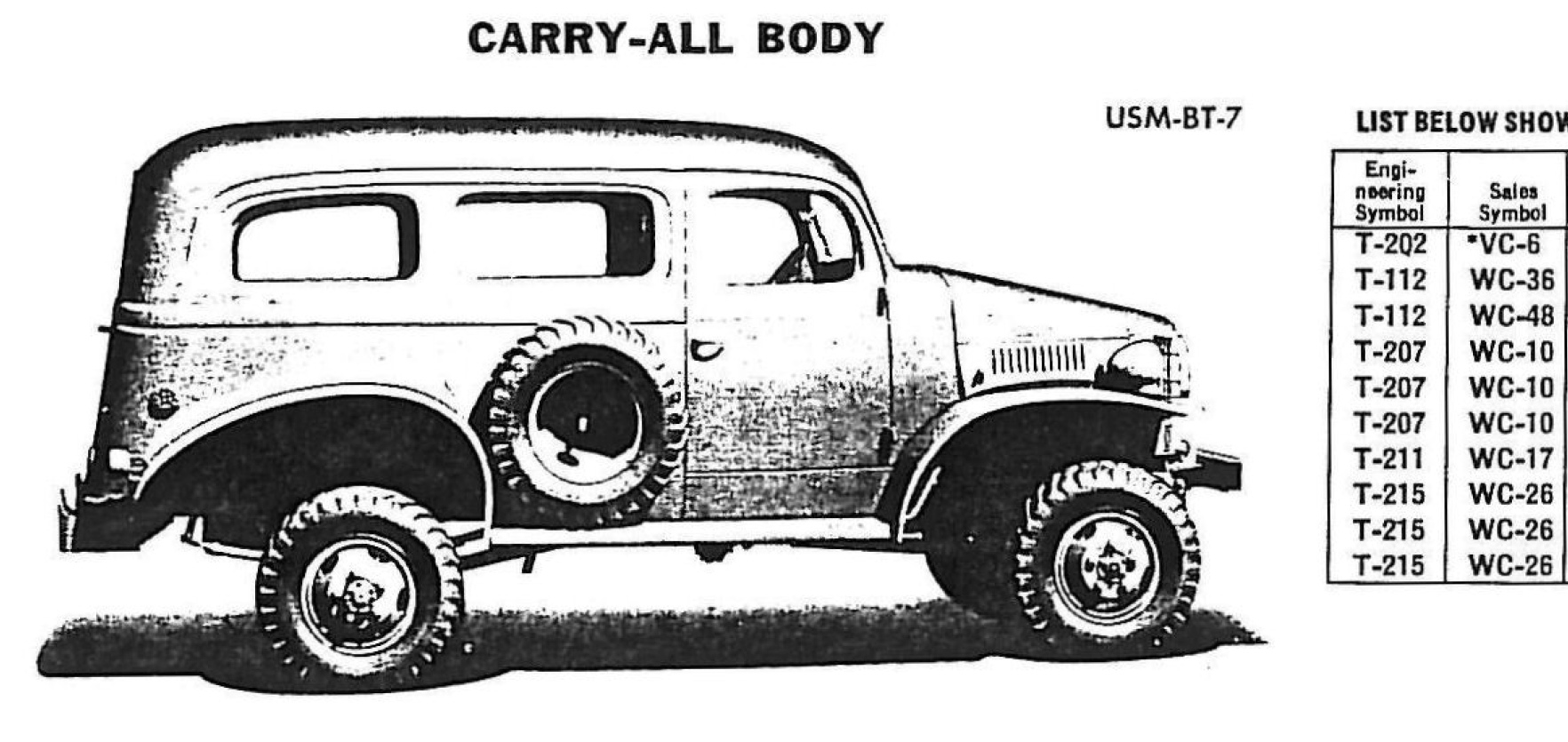
Half-ton Carry-all (4×4 pictured)

WC-10, WC-17, WC-26, WC-36, WC-48

Carryall trucks with a nominal carrying capacity of 1,000 lb (450 kg). The WC-10, WC-17 and WC-26 followed engineering patterns T-207, T-211 and T-215 respectively — whereas the WC-36 and WC-48 were T-112, rear-wheel drive only models, retaining civilian bodywork with bulbous fenders.

=== 1/2-ton (Radio) Command Reconnaissance ===
Command / reconnaissance cars

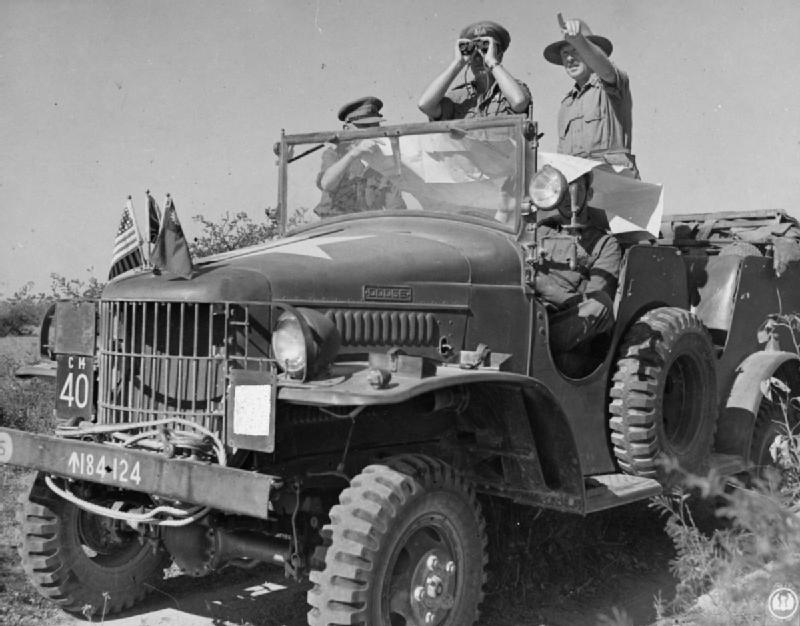
Lord Mountbatten, Allied Commander South East Asia, stands in a 1/2‑ton WC Command Car near Mandalay, 1945.

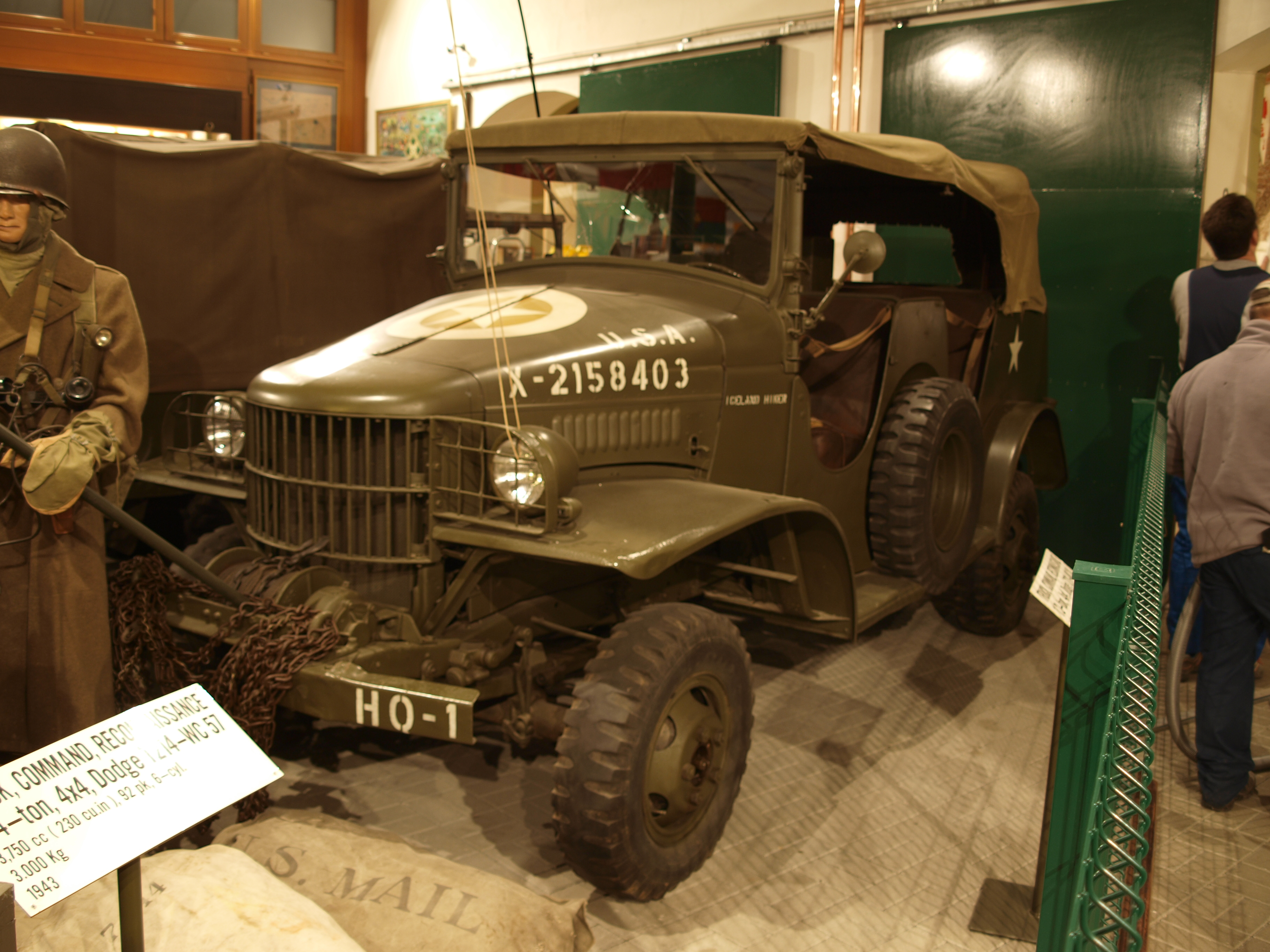
Dodge WC-24 with winch

WC-6, WC-15, WC-23

Command / reconnaissance cars.

WC-7, WC-24

Command / reconnaissance car with winch.

WC-8, WC-16, WC-25

Radio car / Command reconnaissance car with radio, 12 volt.

=== 1/2-ton Trucks, Closed Cab ===
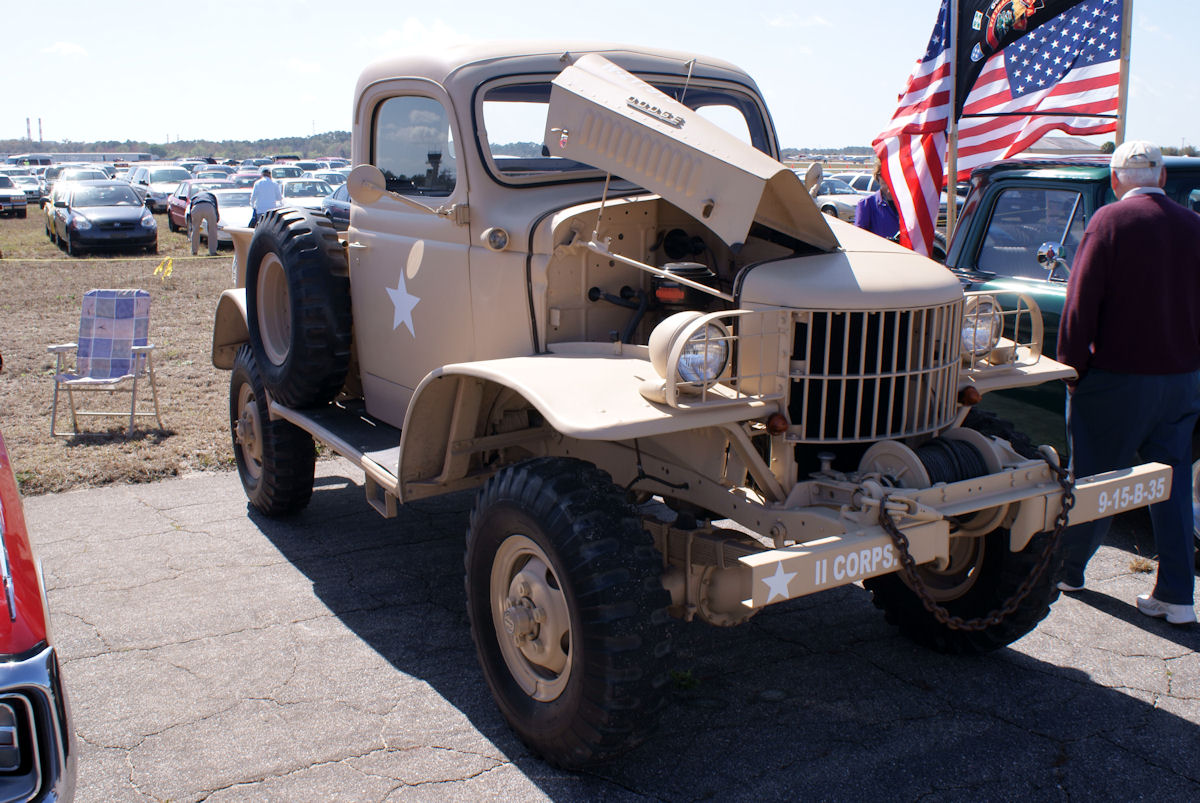
Dodge WC-14 pickup 1941

WC-1, WC-5, WC-12, WC-14, WC-40

Closed cab, two seater pickups with a nominal carrying capacity of a 1,000 lb (450 kg). Some portion of these models were manufactured with winch, at least of the WC-12, the WC-14 (pictured), and the WC-40, reducing the payload to 700 lb (320 kg) — but no distinct model number was assigned for such units. The WC-12's engine displacement was increased to the T-215's volume of 230.2 cu in (3,772 cm^{3}) mid-series, after engine No. 42001.

=== 1/2-ton Trucks, Open Cab ===
Open cab 1/2-tons, w/wo winch

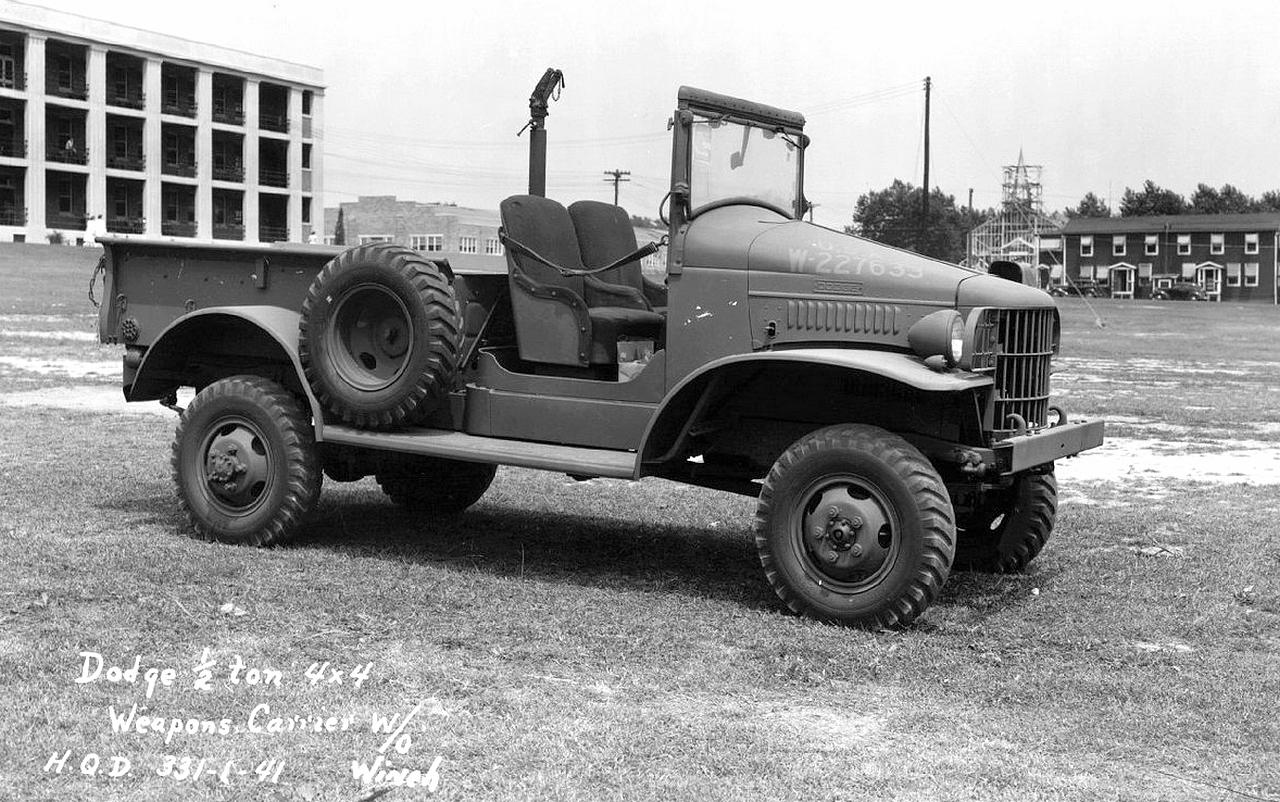
WC-13 half-ton 4×4 with optional M24 machine gun mount.

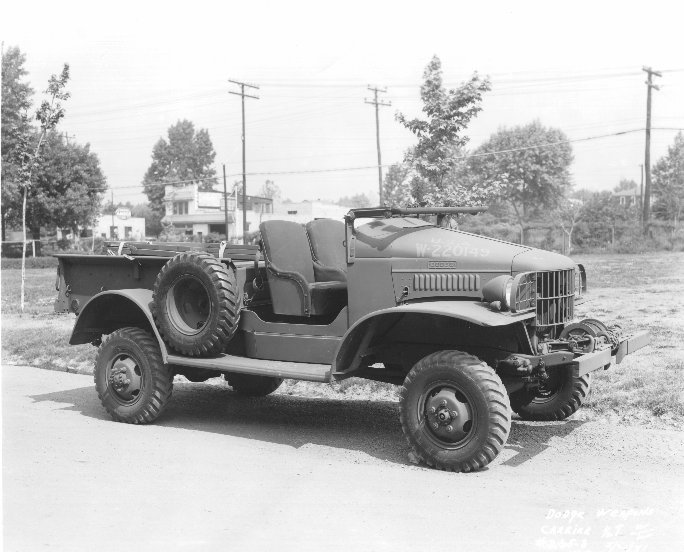
Dodge WC-4 open cab with winch.

WC-3, WC-13, WC-21

Weapon carriers, two seater pickups with open cab. The open cab pickups could be fitted with an optional M24 machine gun mount, which bolted across the front of the bed. The mount could carry the M1918 Browning Automatic Rifle, as well as the M1919 Browning machine gun, and the 0.5 in (12.7 mm) M2 Browning machine gun.

- Length: 181 1/16 in (4.60 m)
- Width: 75 13/16 in (1.93 m)
- Height: with top 88 1/8 in (2.24 m)
- Weight: 4,440 lb (2,010 kg)
- Payload: 1,300 lb (590 kg)

WC-4, WC-22

Open cab weapons carrier, with Braden MU winch, and transverse seats, designed to tow the 37mm M3 anti-tank gun as well as carry the gun crew and ammunition. This type was usually issued to early tank destroyer units. 5570 built.

- Length: 191 5/16 in (4.86 m)
- Width: 75 13/16 in (1.93 m)
- Height: with top 88 1/8 in (2.24 m)
- Weight: 4,775 lb (2,166 kg) net
- Payload: 1,000 lb (450 kg)

=== 1/2-ton (Radio) Panel Vans ===
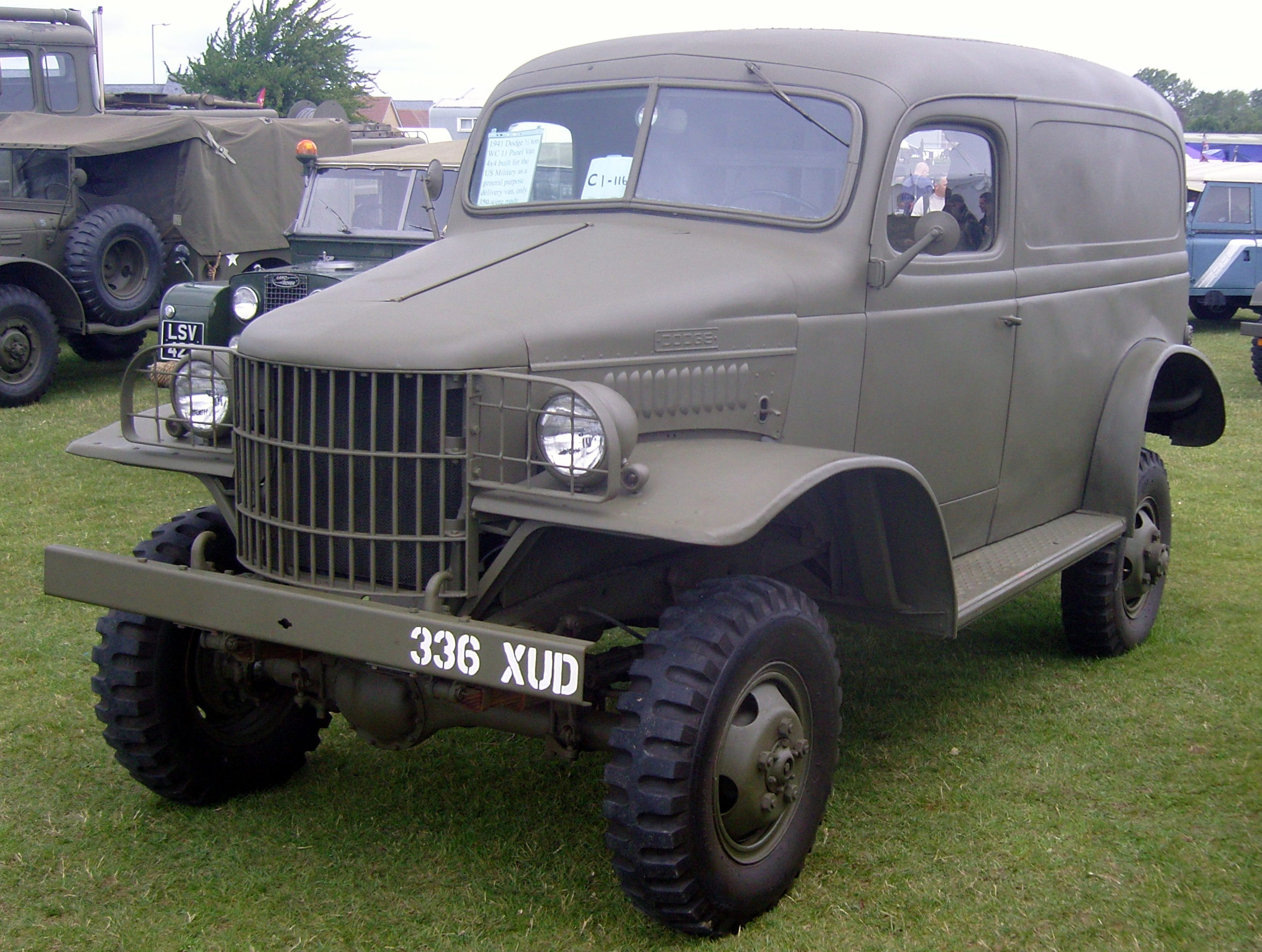
Half-ton 4×4 basic panel van.

WC-11, WC-19, WC-42

Almost 1,400 panel van trucks, and panel van bodied radio communication cars. At first, regular panel van trucks were ordered: 642 units of WC-11, and 103 units of WC-19. The subsequent WC-42 panel vans were however furnished and equipped as radio communication cars. The 650 WC-42 radio panel vans almost outnumbered their bare transportation siblings, and they were also the only radio communication cars that Dodge built in a panel van body style in the entire VC and WC series range.

Almost half of production, 650 units, went to the British Empire under the U.S. Lend-Lease agreement.

There were also negligible numbers made with civilian style bodywork, similar to the 1940 VC-6 Carryall, with only rear-wheel drive, with the T-112 (Dodge) and G-613 (U.S.) internal codes – six units of WC-37 (1941), and a further eight as WC-49, in 1942.

=== 1/2-ton Telephone Service ===
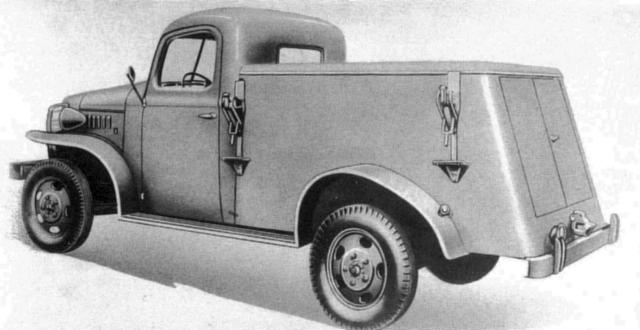
WC-43 K-50 phone service truck

WC-39, WC-43, WC-50

These models were built as technical service trucks for the U.S. Army Signal Corps, designed to install and repair hard telephone lines. Together with some earlier 1/2‑ton GMC/Chevrolet models, and the later 3/4‑ton WC-59 and WC-61, they were also known by the Signal Corps as the K-50 trucks.

Of the two-wheel drive WC-39 and WC-50, only a single unit of each were built, but the four-wheel drive WC-43 numbered 370 units.

=== 1/2-ton Trucks, Emergency Repair ===
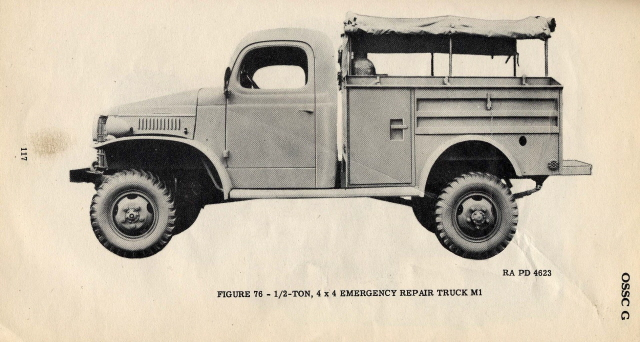
M1 emergency repair truck, WC-41 — compare external picture here.

WC-5, WC-14, WC-20, WC-40, WC-41

Just over one thousand emergency repair chassis and trucks were ordered within the half-ton Dodge G-505, WC series. The Dodge SNL G-657 Master Parts List doesn't explicitly list most of them as built to serve as emergency repair trucks, but the Summary Report of Acceptances, Tank-Automotive Materiel, 1940–1945, shows that at least 956 emergency repair chassis and trucks were received by the Army, involving at least all of the WC-14, WC-20, WC-40, and WC-41 models.

Dodge delivered at least all thirty WC-20, and most of the WC-41 units, as closed cabs with a bare chassis, on a 123 in (312 cm) wheelbase, fitted with dual rear wheels, though a minority, particularly of the WC-5, WC-14, and WC-40s, were possibly built on a 116 in (295 cm) wheelbase; and some as pick-ups. Most were furnished with third party utility service rear bodies, as M1 emergency repair trucks, to provide mobile facilities for emergency ordnance repair (G-061 / G-505). One other body-type was ordered: one T-211 oil servicing truck in 1941.

| U.S. Gvmt. Contract nr. | Tech model | Units ordered | Vehicle / body type – as ordered | Units built | Model code | Vehicle / body type – Dodge description | Units accepted | Summary Report of Acceptances model / type |
|---|---|---|---|---|---|---|---|---|
| W-398-QM-8286 | T-207 | 60 | Emergency Repair | 60 | WC-5 | Closed cab pickup | – | – |
| W-398-QM-9388 | T-211 | 268 | Emergency Repair | 268 | WC-14 | Closed cab pickup | 298 | Emergency Repair, chassis |
| W-398-QM-9388 | T-211 | 30 | Emergency Repair, chassis | 30 | WC-20 | Closed cab – bare chassis | 298 | Emergency Repair, chassis |
| W-398-QM-10327 | T-215 | 275 | Emergency Repair | 275 | WC-40 | Closed cab pickup | 275 | Emergency Repair |
| W-398-QM-10327 | T-215 | 267 | Emergency Repair, chassis | 267 | WC-41 | Closed cab – bare chassis | 54 | (Closed cab) chassis |
| W-398-QM-10327 | T-215 | 267 | Emergency Repair, chassis | 267 | WC-41 | Closed cab – bare chassis | 213 | Chassis, Emergency Repair |
| W-398-QM-11244 | T-215 | 39 | Emergency Repair | 39 | WC-41 | Closed cab | 39 | Emergency Repair, chassis |
| W-398-QM-11592 | T-215 | 77 | Emergency Repair, chassis | 77 | WC-41 | Emergency Repair, cab & chassis | 77 | Emergency Repair, chassis |

== Three-quarter-ton models ==
Three-quarter ton WC series

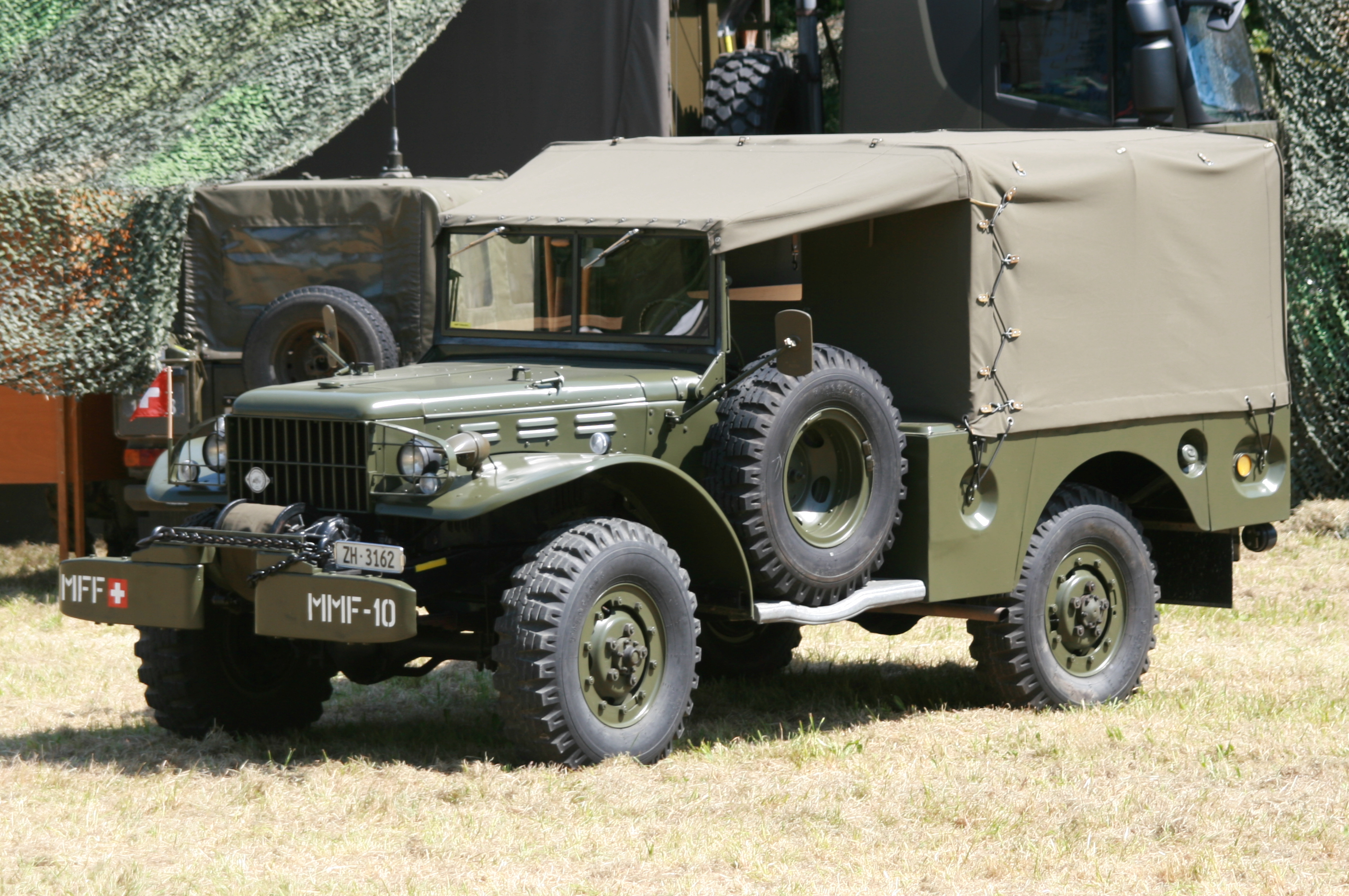
The ≈190,000 WC‑51 & WC‑52 trucks (shown) make up half of the total of ≈380,000 different WC-series built.

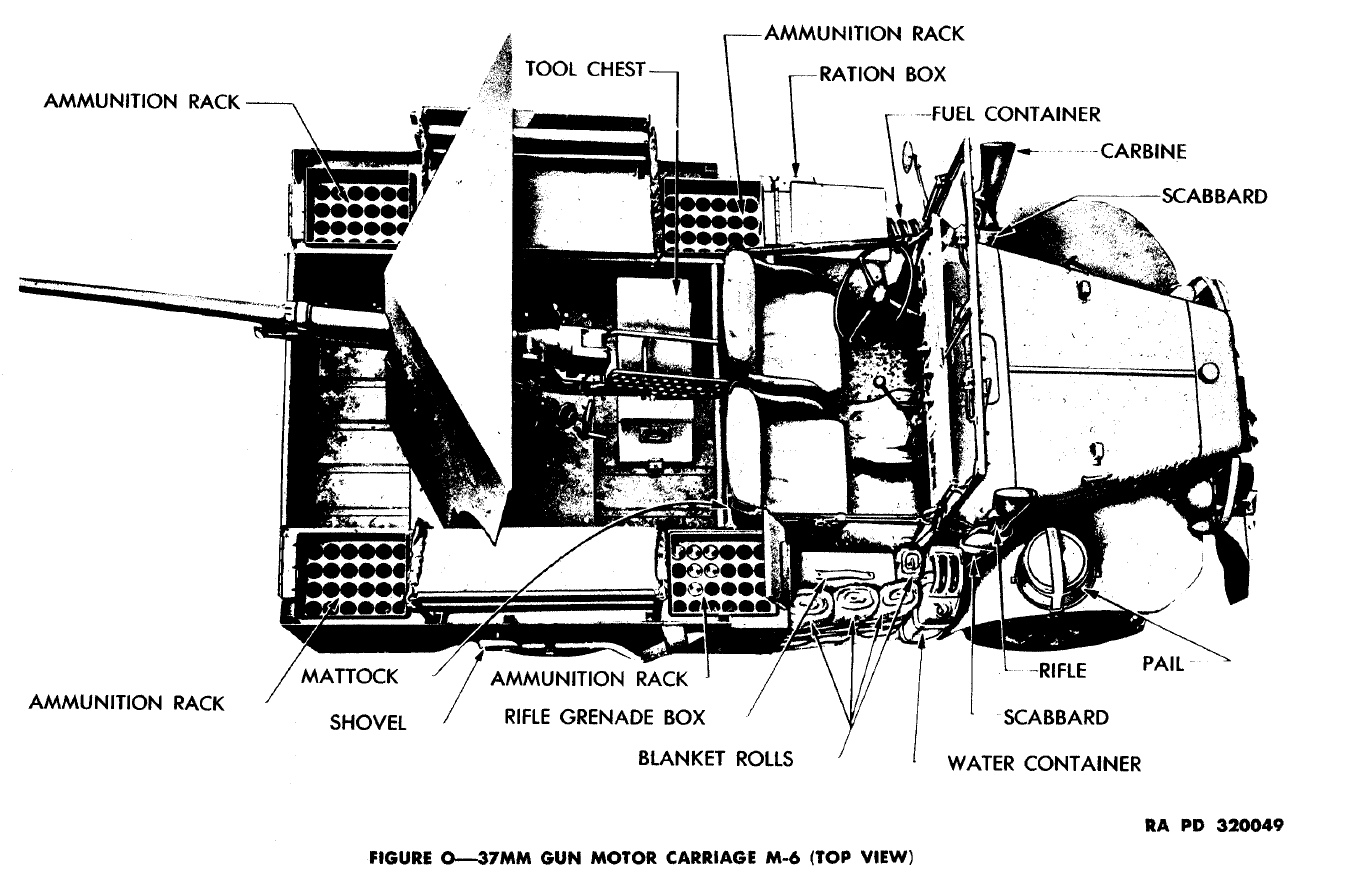
Top view of WC-55 (a version of the WC‑51 / WC‑52) shows the squat, short and wide stance, proportions of the revised 3/4‑ton Dodges

By late 1941, the Dodge WC range was significantly redesigned. All four-wheeled models were reinforced and uprated to a nominal three-quarter ton off-road payload rating, under the revised G-502 U.S.Army Ordnance Corps Supply catalog number; and later, for 1943, a stretched six-wheel drive, 1 1/2‑ton rated variant was developed, under supply code G-507.

All models were widened to front and rear tracks of 64 3/4 in (1.64 m), widening the front track by as much as 5 3/8 in (14 cm), and the rear track by 3 3/8 in (8.6 cm) on most models. The new axles were not only the same width, but also got the same differentials and axle carriers. The tires were widened from 7.50×16 to 9 inches (from 19 cm to 23 cm) wide. Moreover, the bulk production variants were significantly shortened, giving the vehicles much more square proportions, like on their younger 1/4‑ton brothers. On all the troops & weapons carriers, and command / reconnaissance & radio trucks, the wheelbase were all cut by almost half a meter (18 in / 46 cm), from a 116 in (2.95 m) to a 98 in (2.49 m) wheelbase. Only ambulances, carry-alls, and technical service trucks kept a long wheelbase. Panel vans were dropped from the range and no longer made.

The big production volume models – the WC-51/-52 and the WC-56/-57/-58 – also got literally more square bodies; with more square, shorter and wider, length to width ratios. The integrated grille / brush-guard became straight, and the hoods (bonnets) became lower and wider, and were flattened – both as in losing their previous curvature, and now just being horizontal – so they became more useful as an improvised table-top, and the front windows / windshields on these models could now also be folded forward, to lay flat on their hoods, just like on the 1/4-ton jeeps. Under the hood, the 3/4-tons kept the 6-cylinder inline, L-head engine of 92 hp (73 kW) gross, from the later model half‑ton WC series.

The biggest volume production variants, the WC-51 and-52 pick-up / troops and weapons-carrier models, received a completely redesigned rear bed, that mostly consisted of two longitudinal, rectangular boxes, that integrated the rear wheel wells with under-seat stowage compartments fore and aft of the rear wheels, while now seating the troops sideways and on top of the rear wheels, facing each other, instead of a in a commercial, "step-side" bed, in between the wheels. The new bed/box design widened these models to 6 ft 11 in (2.11 m), and offered much more space for the troops' backpacks and gear, between their feet, and under the seats. A single such truck, at just 13 ft 11 in (4.24 m) long (or 14 ft 9 in / 4.48 m with winch), offered practical all-terrain transportation for a full eight man rifle squad, their weapons and gear.

With the nickname 'jeep' now moving on to the smaller 1/4‑ton trucks, some soldiers called the Dodges 'Beeps' (for "Big jeep") instead.

Eventually, almost half of the more than fifty different WC series models manufactured – almost 183,000 trucks – were WC‑51 & WC‑52 cargo/troop and weapons carriers — and one third of those with an engine-powered front winch.

=== 3/4-ton Ambulances ===
WC-54

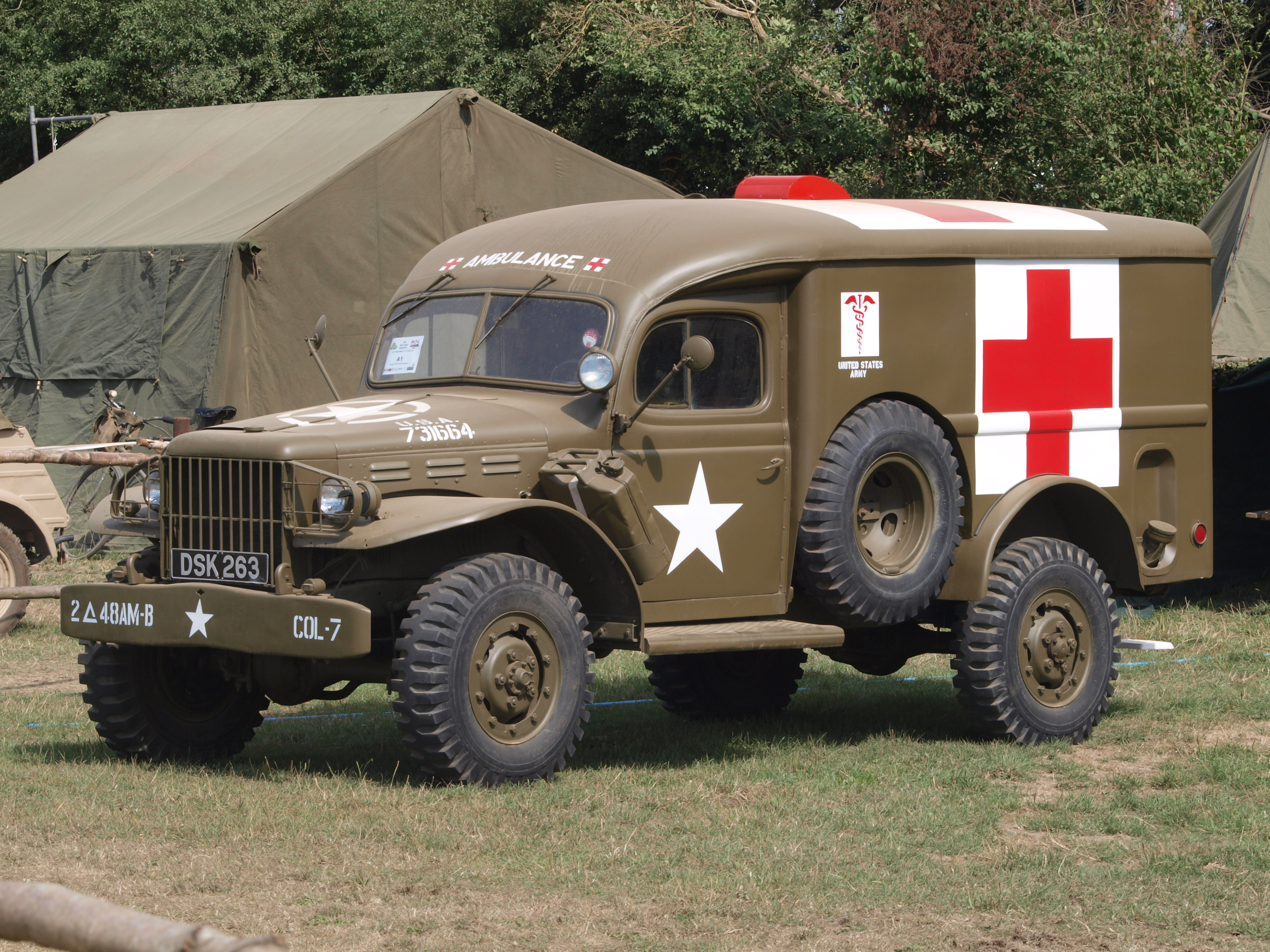
1943 WC-54 Ambulance

The WC-54 Truck, 3/4 ton, 4×4 Ambulance, Dodge (G-502), was produced as an ambulance, but a few were modified to serve as radio/telephone trucks with the US Signal Corps. A total of 26,002 WC-54 units were built from 1942 through 1944, after which the ambulance was redesigned, and replaced by the WC-64 in 1945.

- Length: 16 ft 3 in (4.95 m)
- Width: 6 ft 6 in (1.98 m)
- Height: 7 ft 6 in (2.29 m)
- Weight: 5,920 lb (2,685 kg)
- Payload: 1,800 lb (820 kg)

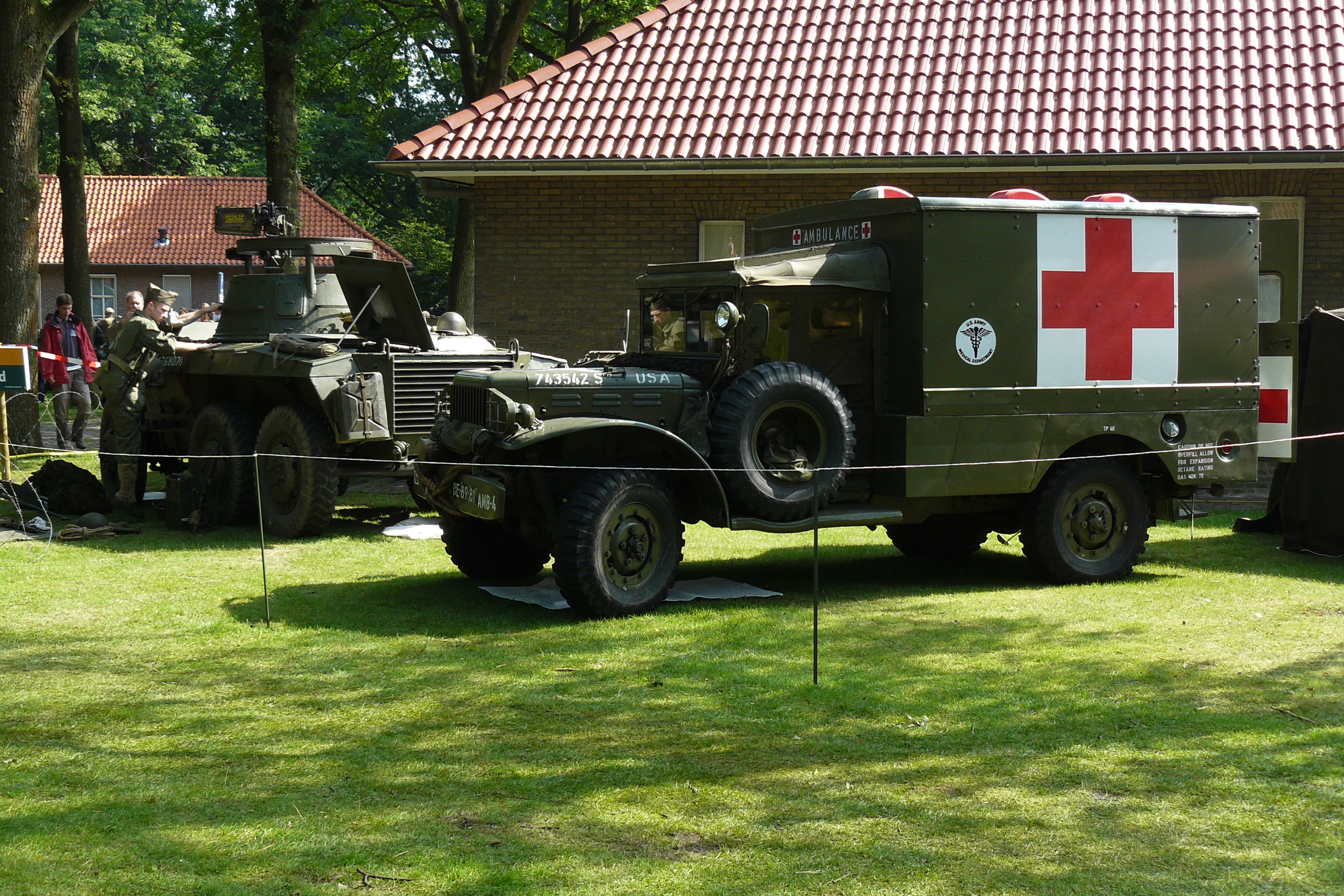
Dodge WC-64 Ambulance

WC-64

The WC-64 KD Truck, 3/4 ton, 4×4 Ambulance Dodge (G-502) was an ambulance based on the same chassis as the WC-54 but with a knock-down body designed to increase the number of vehicles that could be shipped at the same time. The rear boxes were supplied in two major parts: lower and upper. The lower part of the box was attached to the chassis at the factory, while the upper box was crated for installation in the field. 3,500 Knock-down ambulances were built between the beginning of 1945 and the end of the war, the great majority (2,531 units) went to allies under lend-lease:

- 1,123 to the Free French forces
- 644 to British Commonwealth
- 475 to China
- 149 to Brazil and 82 to other Latin American republics

=== 3/4-ton Carryall ===
WC-53 Carry-all
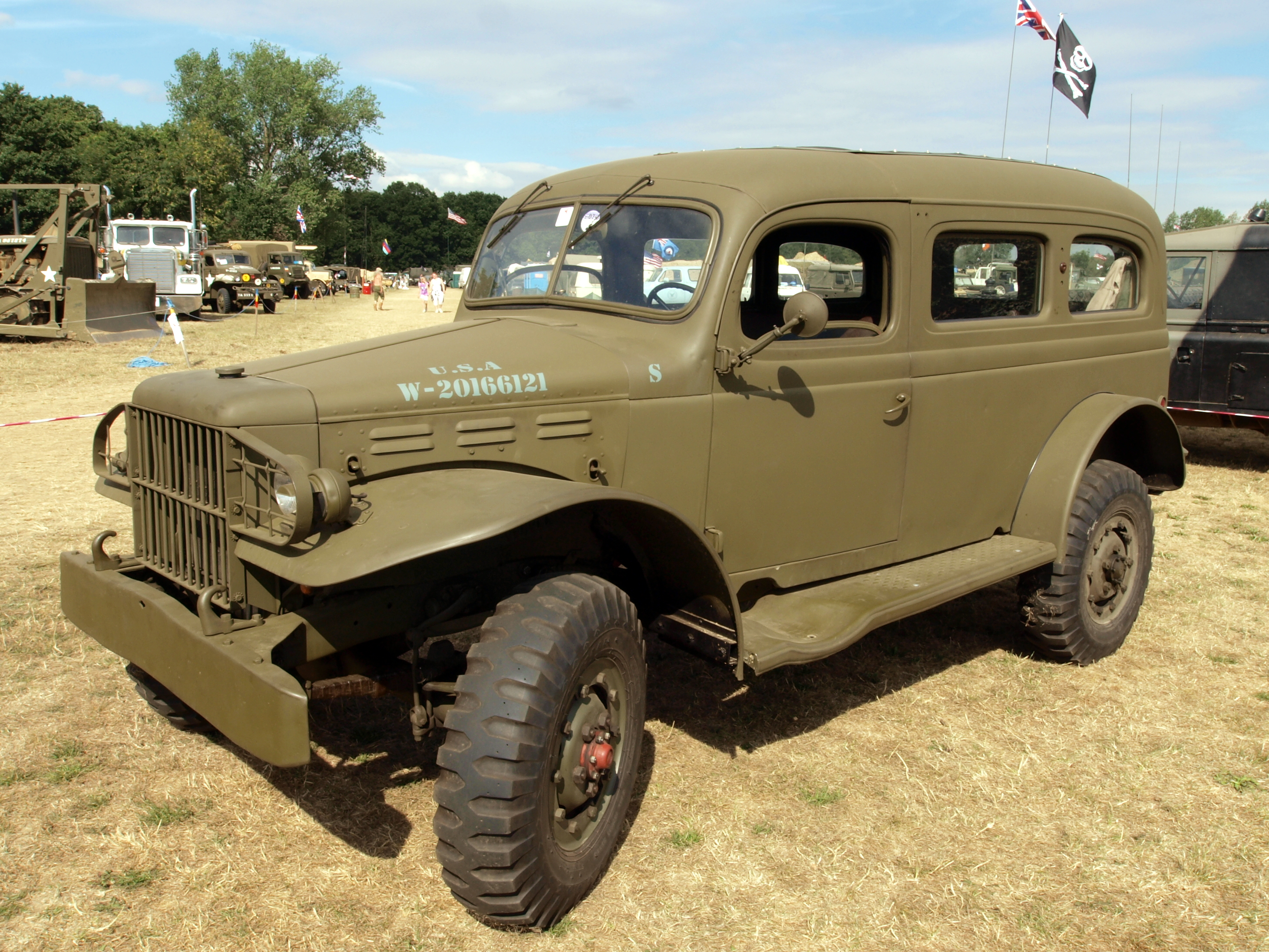

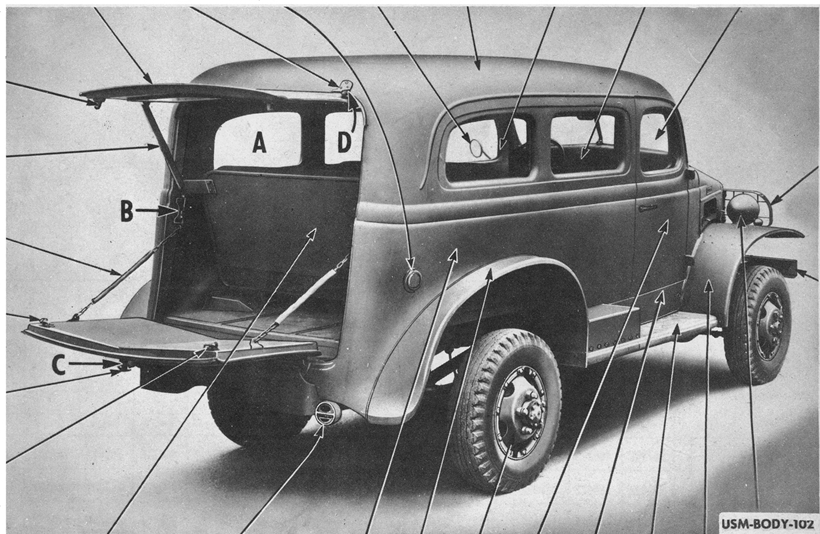
Split tailgate shown on rear

WC-53

A carryall, the WC-53 was mechanically largely identical to the WC-54 ambulance, but its body was the 1939 civilian carryall, modified with the wide open military fenders and grate-like grille, square box engine housing, and heavy butch front bumper, like the other models.

But the carryall had some comforts – not only a cabin heater (shared with the WC-54), but flexible seating for up to eight people, and all six side windows were wind-up opening. The seating consisted of a front 2-seat bench for the driver and a front center passenger, a folding front-right passenger seat to allow rear access, a two-seat second row bench, leaving access to the rear full width three-seat bench. Upholstery was often civilian grade naugahyde, fit for higher officers. Both the third and 2nd row bench-seats were removable, to increase rear luggage space as needed, their legs held in metal mountings, inset in the full length and width wooden floor.
WC-53s were also fitted as radio trucks with a sideways bench on the left side, to seat the radio operator, and perhaps a commander and clerk. The right-side running-board came standard with a box for a 2nd battery, to provide enough voltage for radio equipment.

The driver's side door has a mount to carry the spare wheel, but although the door was fully functional, it could not be opened while holding a wheel, so the driver would then have to enter from the passenger side. The rear end had a horizontally split tailgate.

8,400 WC-53: Truck, 3/4 ton, 4×4 Dodge Carryall (G-502) were built. No carryalls came from the factory with a winch, though there was a field modification available.

- Length: 15 ft 6 in (4.72 m)
- Width: 6 ft 7 in (2.01 m)
- Height: 6 ft 8 in (2.03 m)
- Weight: 5,700 lb (2,590 kg)
- Payload: 1,750 lb (790 kg)

=== 3/4-ton (Radio) Command Reconnaissance Cars ===
WC-56

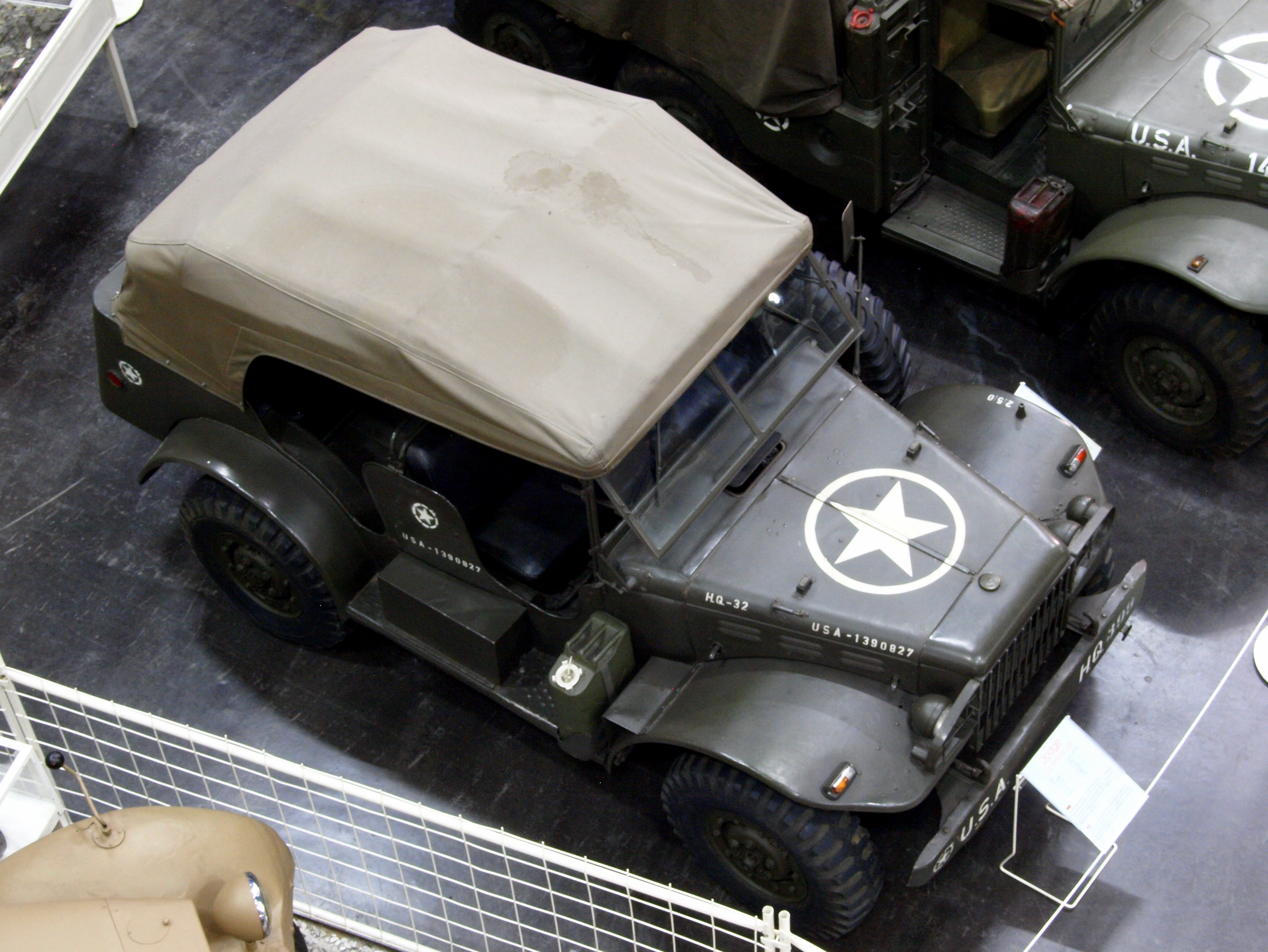
The WC-56 was wider and much shorter than the 1/2‑ton command cars, giving it quite squat proportions.

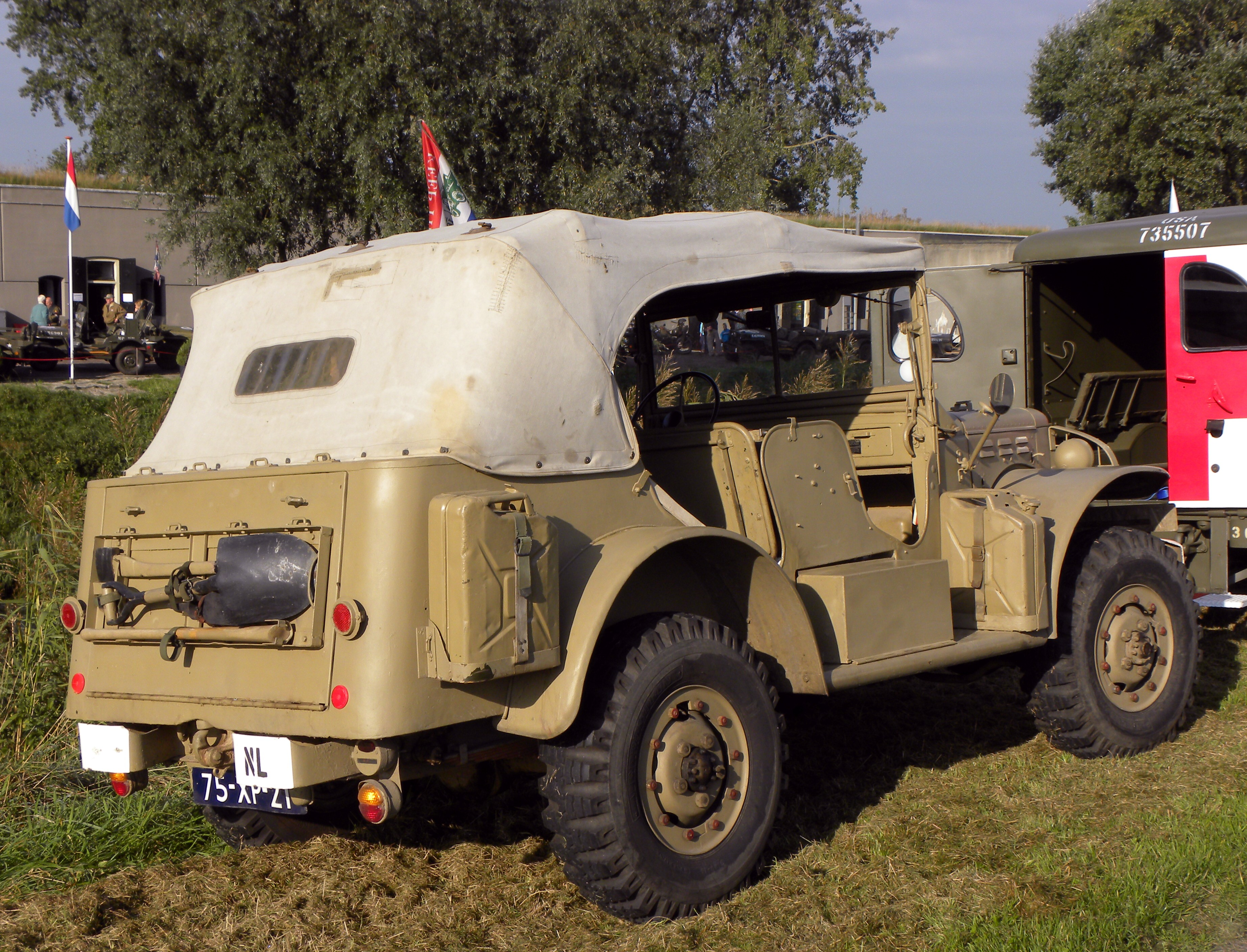
Rear of command car, desert tan

The WC-56 Truck, Command Reconnaissance, 3/4 ton, 4×4 w/o Winch, Dodge (G-502) was a command and reconnaissance vehicle akin to an oversized quarter-ton jeep or VW Kübelwagen, offering fixed bench-seats, wide enough for three-abreast seating for adults – both front and rear. In addition, large wooden planks served as map-reading tables and make-shift writing-desks; in the front it slid in/out of the dashboard for the right front passenger, either over or under the large glove box. In the rear, a full-width plank was normally tucked behind the front seat-back, but could be pulled up and onto the occupants' laps, to unfold large maps. The soft-top included side-curtains, for better weather shielding.

The command cars did not prove as popular as the small jeeps, as they were heavier and not as maneuverable, plus its distinctive profile made them a target, whether you had a WC-56, -57, or -58. Some 21,156 units were built of the basic WC-56 version.

- Length: 13 ft 10 in (4.22 m)
- Width: 6 ft 7 in (2.00 m)
- Height: 6 ft 9 in (2.07 m)
- Weight: 5,335 lb (2,420 kg)
- Payload: 1,750 lb (800 kg)

WC-57

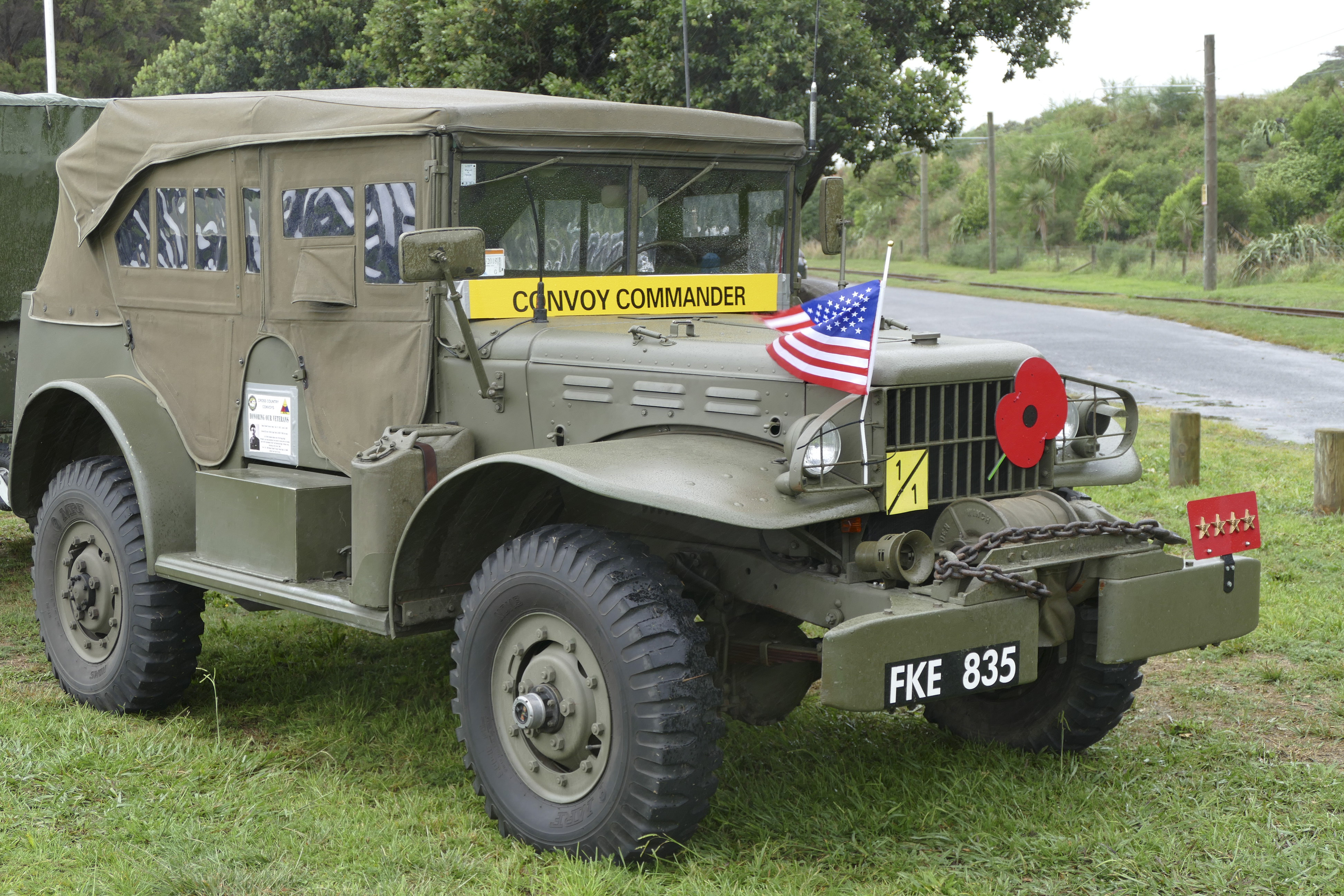
Unlike jeeps, the Dodge command cars' soft-top included canvas sides (WC-57 with winch).

The WC-57 Truck, Command Reconnaissance, 3/4 ton, 4×4 w/Winch Dodge (G-502) was identical to the WC-56, but it carried a power take-off (PTO) driven Braden MU2 7,500 lb (3,402 kg) capacity winch on a 10 inch (25 cm) longer protruding front bumper and frame, reducing its approach angle.

6,010 units were built in addition to the WC-56s.

- Length: 14 ft 8 in (4.46 m)
- Width: 6 ft 7 in (2.00 m)
- Height: 6 ft 9 in (2.07 m)
- Weight: 5,644 lb ( 2,560 kg)
- Payload: 1,750 lb (800 kg)

WC-58

The WC-58 Truck, Radio, 3/4 ton, 4×4 w/o Winch, Dodge (G-502) was identical to the WC-56 Command / Reconnaissance Car, but fitted with a Signal Corps Radio set in front of the rear seat, and a 12-volt electrical system. Some WC-58 models may have been built, based on the WC-57 with winch, as well. A total of 2,344 units of WC-56 and WC-57 were radio equipped, but once all command cars started receiving 12-Volt electrical systems (about midway in the series), the WC-58s no longer constituted additional production, but were instead a converted fraction of the WC-56 and WC-57 production. As other 3/4-ton models also started to receive 12-Volt electrical systems, they too were getting fitted with radios as needed. At the end of it all, a total of 2,344 radio equipped command cars were counted as WC-58s.

- Length: 13 ft 10 in (4.22 m) / 14 ft 7 in (4.46 m) with winch
- Width: 6 ft 7 in (2.00 m)
- Height: 6 ft 9 in (2.07 m)
- Weight: 5,644 lb (2,560 kg)
- Payload: 1,750 lb (800 kg)

=== 3/4-ton Trucks, Weapons Carrier ===
WC-51 and WC-52

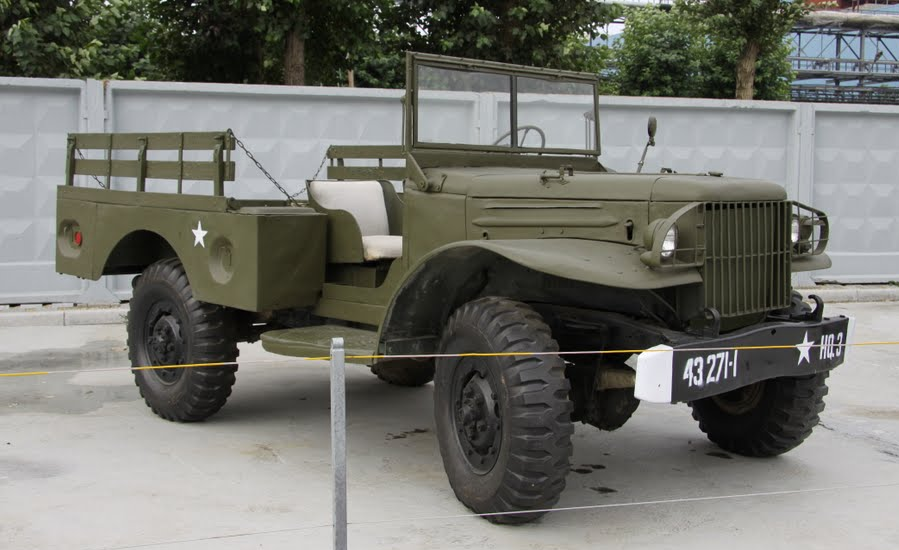
With its top and bows down, the WC-51/52 followed the low-profile design doctrine – in Russian called the "Dodge 3/4" – UMMC Museum of Military and Automotive Equipment, Verkhnyaya Pyshma, Russia.

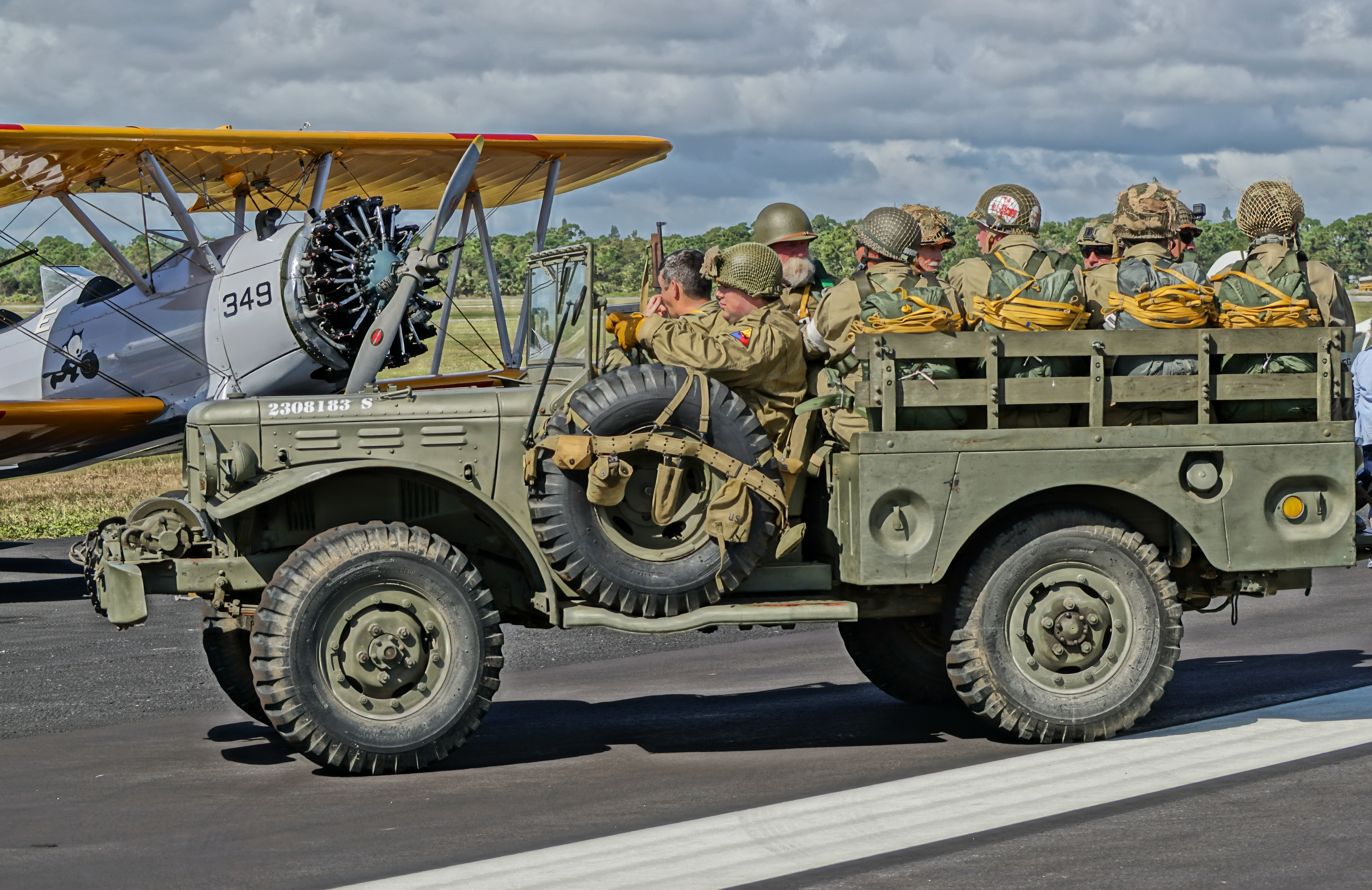
Up to ten troops would fit in a WC-51 or WC-52. Shown WC-52 is identical to the WC-51, but with a power take-off front winch.

The G-502, WC-51 & WC-52: "Truck, Cargo, 3/4-ton, 4×4, Weapons Carrier" (T-214; from early 1942), had largely redesigned bodies and frames, compared to their half-ton, 1940–1941 forebears, yet retained mechanically as much as possible — improving what was necessary, while maintaining supply, logistics, and training continuity. The design was now blatantly more jeep-like, with a much shorter, lower, wider, versatile, open cab pickup body. The hood became flat and horizontal, and the windshield could now also be folded forward, flat on it. With the top and bows down, the WC-51 and -52 followed the low-profile design doctrine of the time. Engine and drive-train were almost completely carried over from the T-215 half-tons, except for the uprated, wider track axles (64 3/4 in (1.64 m)), which were now 18 in (46 cm) closer together, for a 98 in (2.49 m) wheelbase.

The WC-51 and -52 could be fitted with an optional M24A1 machine gun mount, or other devices. The M24A1 mount bolted across the front of the bed, and could carry the M1918 Browning Automatic Rifle, the M1919 Browning machine gun, or the M2 Browning machine gun. Lack of a winch gave the WC-51 a 10 in (25 cm) shorter front overhang, and thus a better approach angle. The WC-52 not only differed from the WC-51 by having a power take-off driven Braden MU‑2 7,500 lb (3,400 kg) capacity winch on the front bumper, but to accommodate it, the WC-52 was actually built on its own, longer frame. With about every third unit carrying a winch, these were thus rarely ever retrofitted.

Almost three quarters of Dodge's 255,195 total 3/4‑ton, G-502, WC series production, were built as WC-51 and WC-52, cargo, troops and weapon carriers. 123,541 were built without winch as the WC-51, and 59,114 with a front winch as WC-52 — for a total of 182,655 units. When adding the 5,380 WC-55, M6 gun motor carriages, that were later downgraded back to WC-52 specification, it brings the total number to over 188,000 of these models. Although nearly a quarter of that (44,229) were passed on to allies, mostly through Lend-Lease, once the 1939 U.S. Army reorganization from 8‑man to 12‑man (rifle) squads got tied more closely into troop-car procurement, Dodge received orders for a similar amount (43,224 built) of the stretched, 12‑troop (one squad) capacity, WC-62 & WC-63, 1 1/2‑ton, 6×6 trucks.

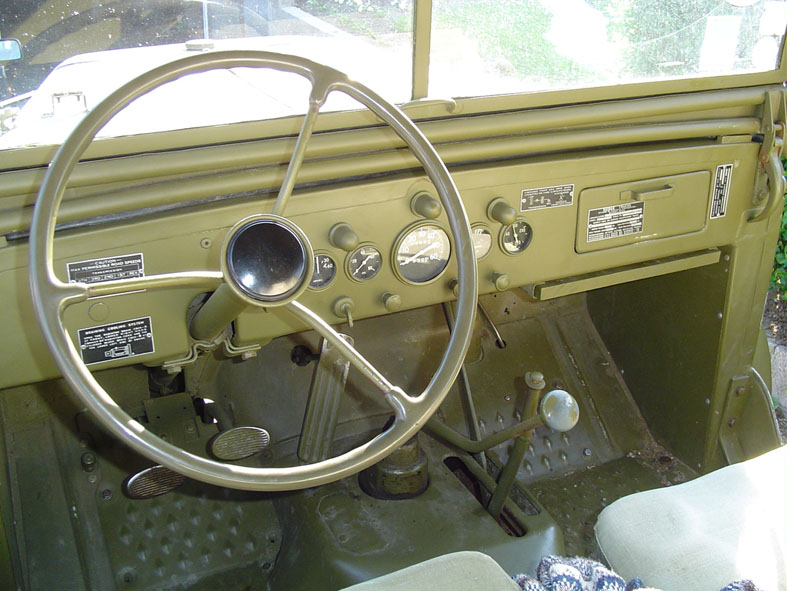
WC-51 cabin interior

- Length: 13 ft 11 in (4.24 m), or 14 ft 8.5 in (4.48 m) with winch
- Width: 6 ft 11 in (2.11 meters)
- Height (with canvas cover): 6 ft 10 in (2.08 m)
- Height (with top down): 5 ft 2 in (1.57 m)
- Weight: 5,250 lb (2,382 kg) net – 5,550 lb (2,518 kg) net with winch
- Payload: 1,750 lb (800 kg)
- Tires: 9.00 × 16 in., 8ply

A substantial amount – almost a quarter – of all the 3/4‑ton weapons carriers (a total of 44,229 WC-51 and WC-52 trucks), were provided through Lend-Lease to various Allies:

- 24,902 to the Soviet Union, who used some to pull their ZiS-3 76-mm anti-tank guns,
- 10,884 to Britain
- 3,711 to China
- 3,495 to the Free French forces
- 954 to Brazil and 204 to other Latin American countries

=== 3/4-ton truck, M6 gun motor carriage ===
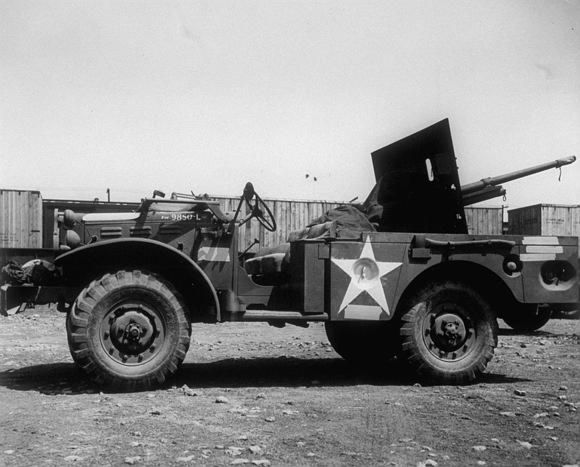
WC-55, M6 gun motor carriage

WC-55

The M6 37 mm gun motor carriage, 3/4-ton, 4×4 (abbreviated as M6 GMC), or fully described "M6 Fargo gun motor carriage with 37 mm anti-tank gun," (by Dodge numbered WC-55), was a modified G-502 Dodge WC-52, designed and built to carry an M3A1 37mm anti-tank gun combined with gun shield, mounted on its cargo bed, facing rearward. The WC-55 with gun combination was designated by Standard Nomenclature List supply catalog number G-121. A total of 5,380 were built by Fargo in 1942, but most were later dismantled / downgraded and returned to service as WC-52 cargo trucks.

Fielded as a stopgap design from late 1942 in North Africa, in limited use with the US Army Tank Destroyer Battalions, and in the Pacific War in 1943/1944, improvements in enemy tanks quickly rendered the 37mm gun underpowered, and better guns became available. The WC-55 was first downgraded to "limited standard" in 1943, and subsequently declared obsolete, finally by early 1945.

- Length: 14 ft 8 1/2 in (4.48 m)
- Width: 7 ft 2 in (2.18 m)
- Height: 8 ft 2 in (2.49 m) to top of gun shield
- Weight: 5,600 lb (2 540 kg)
- Storage: 80 rounds of 37mm munitions

=== 3/4-ton Telephone Service ===
WC-59

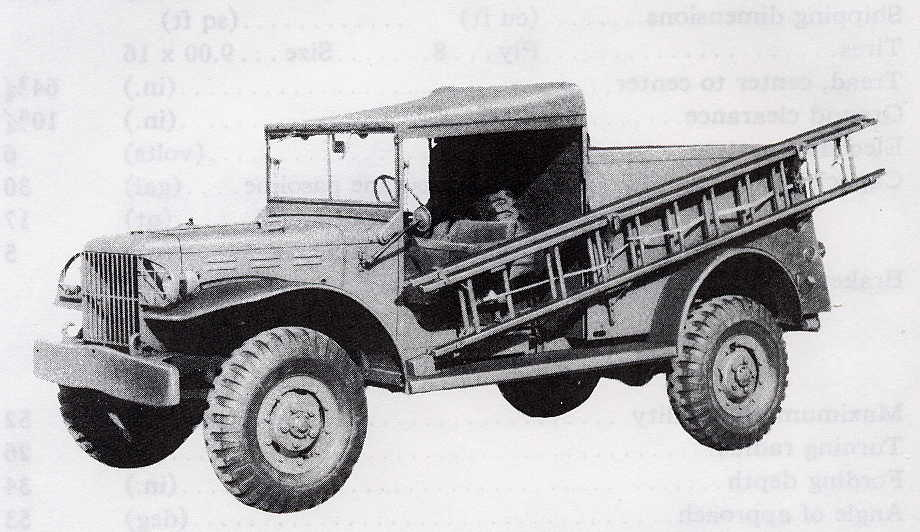
WC-59, 3/4-ton K-50 telephone truck with ladder on side.

The WC-59 Truck, Telephone Maintenance, 3/4 ton, 4×4 Dodge (G-502) was designed to install and repair telephone lines. Based on the same chassis as the WC-54 ambulances, sharing a 23 in (58 cm) longer wheelbase than the regular 3/4‑ton WC series. The spare wheel was carried behind the seats, and a step ladder fitted where the spare wheel normally would have been. 549 units were built. The bespoke bed made it a K-50 truck to the Signal Corps. These were initially fitted to both Dodge and Chevrolet chassis.

- Length: 16 ft 0 in (4.88 m)
- Width: 6 ft 6 in (1.98 m)
- Height: 6 ft 9 in (2.06 m)
- Weight: 5,357 lb (2,430 kg)
- Payload: 1,750 lb (800 kg)

WC-61

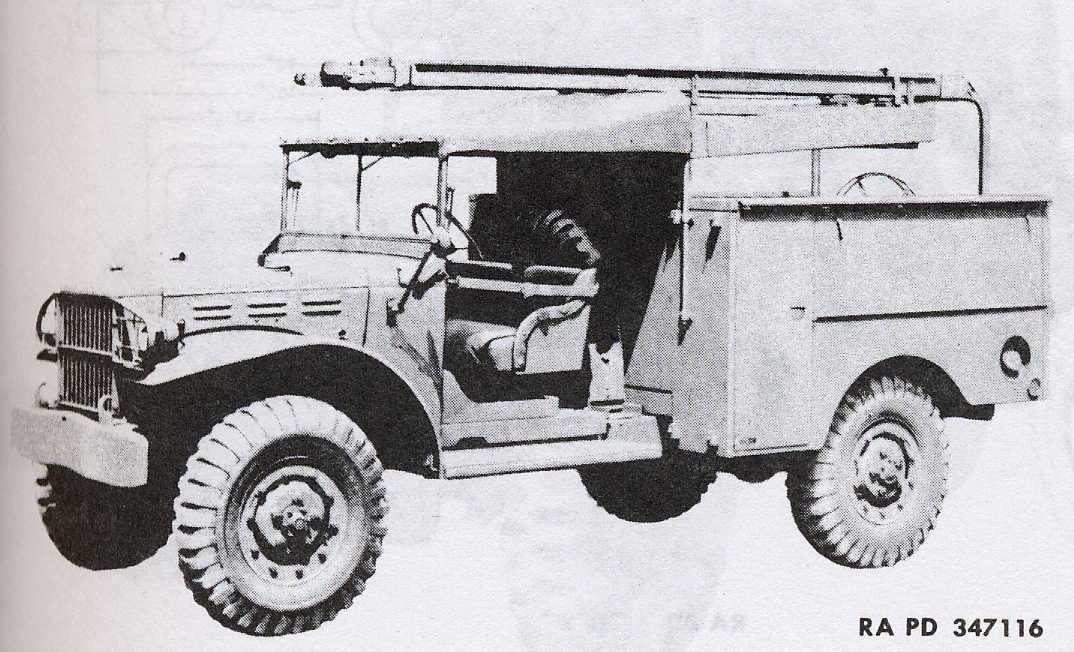
WC-61 / K-50B truck

The WC-61 Light Maintenance Truck, 3/4 ton, 4×4 Dodge (G-502) was also designed to install and repair telephone lines. Replacement for the WC-59, the WC-61 had the step ladder mounted on the roof, the spare wheel was still fitted behind the seats, and the tool trunks were accessible from the outside. Just 58 were built. The US Signal Corps referred to these as the K-50B truck.

- Length: 15 ft 6 in (4.73 m)
- Width: 6 ft 10 in (2.08 m)
- Height (without ladder): 7 ft 5 in (2.26 m)
- Weight: 5,952 lb (2,700 kg)
- Payload: 1,750 lb (800 kg)

=== 3/4-ton Truck, Emergency Repair ===
WC-60

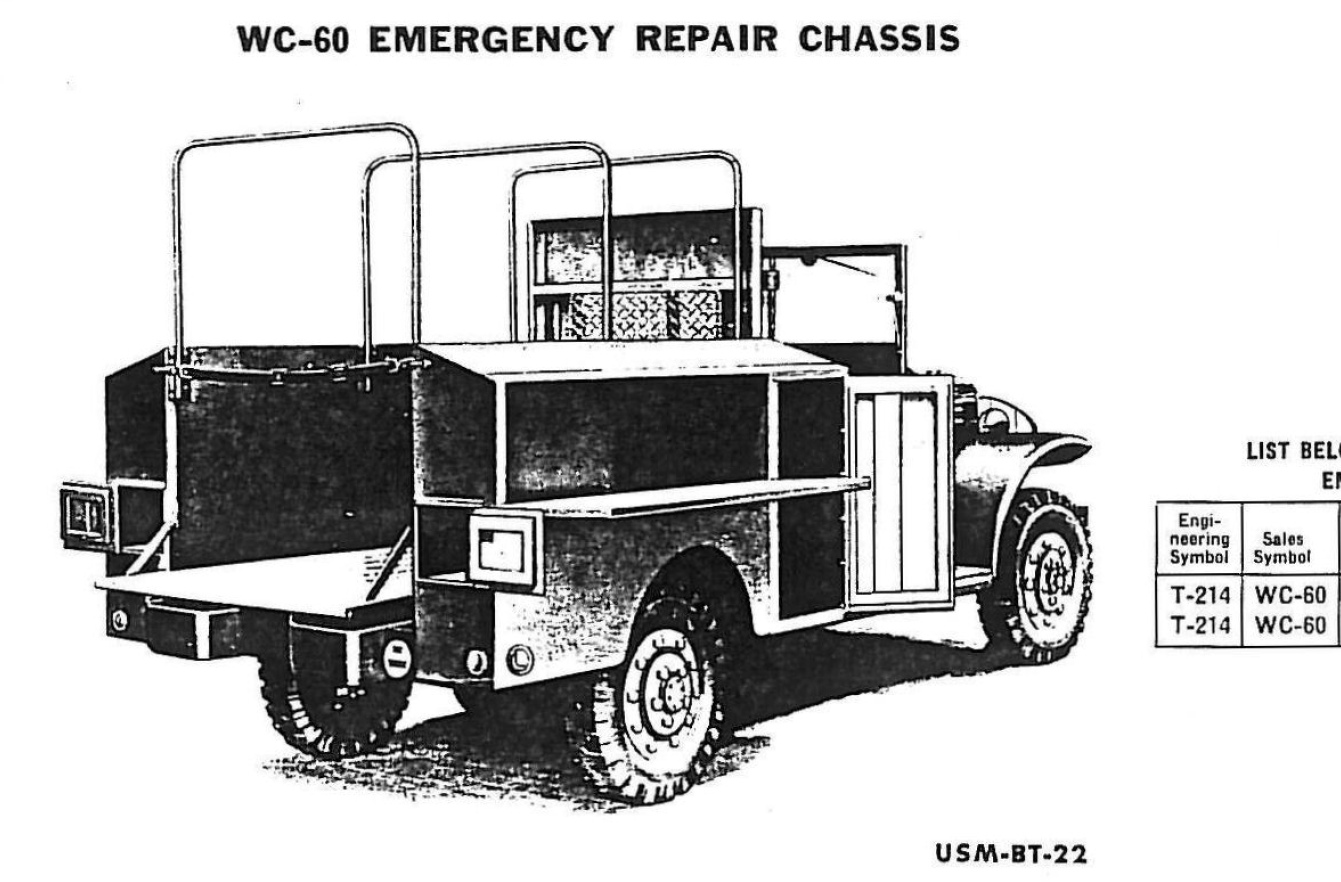
Dodge WC-60 Emergency Repair Chassis, M2

The WC-60 chassis, fitted with a bed similar to the WC-61 by the American Coach and Body Co. of Cleveland, Ohio, formed the M2 Emergency Repair truck, 3/4 ton, 4×4 Dodge (SNL supply code G-061), a mobile workshop designed for field maintenance. Its open-topped service-type bed featured numerous tool trunks and stowage bins, accessible from the outside. 296 units were built.

- Length: 15 ft 6 in (4.73 m)
- Width: 6 ft 10 in (2.08 m)
- Height: 7 ft 5 in (2.26 m)
- Weight: 5,952 lb (2 700 kg)
- Payload: 1,750 lb (800 kg)

== One-and-a-half-ton models ==
G-507, 1 1/2-ton, 6×6 trucks

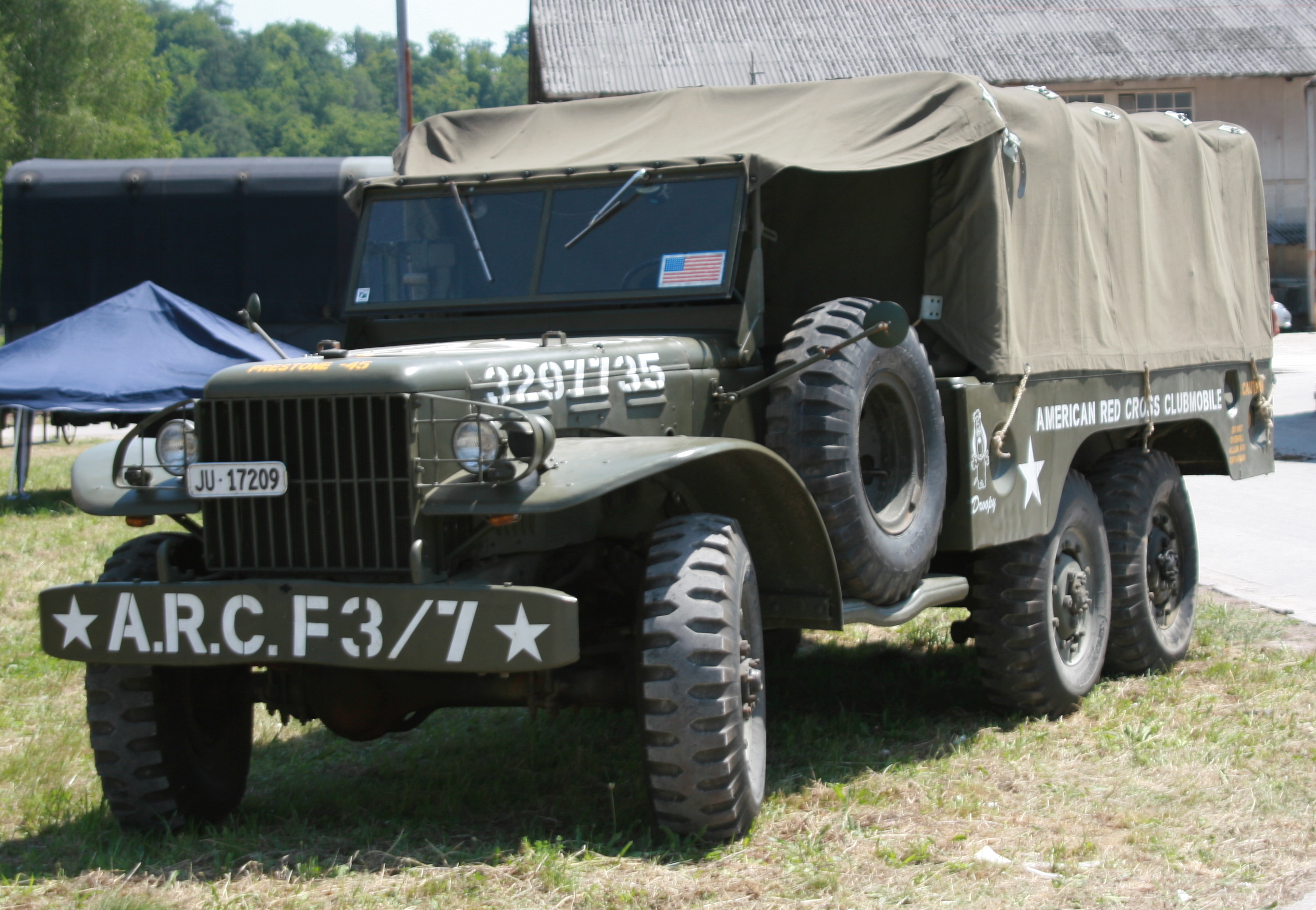
WC-62 – without winch

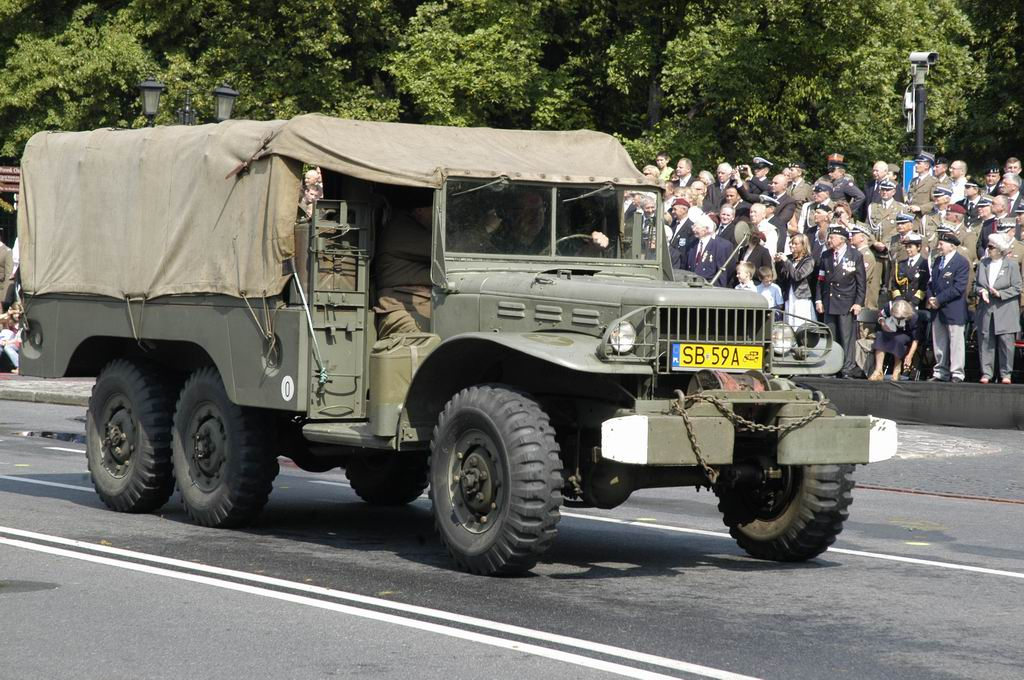
WC-63 – with winch

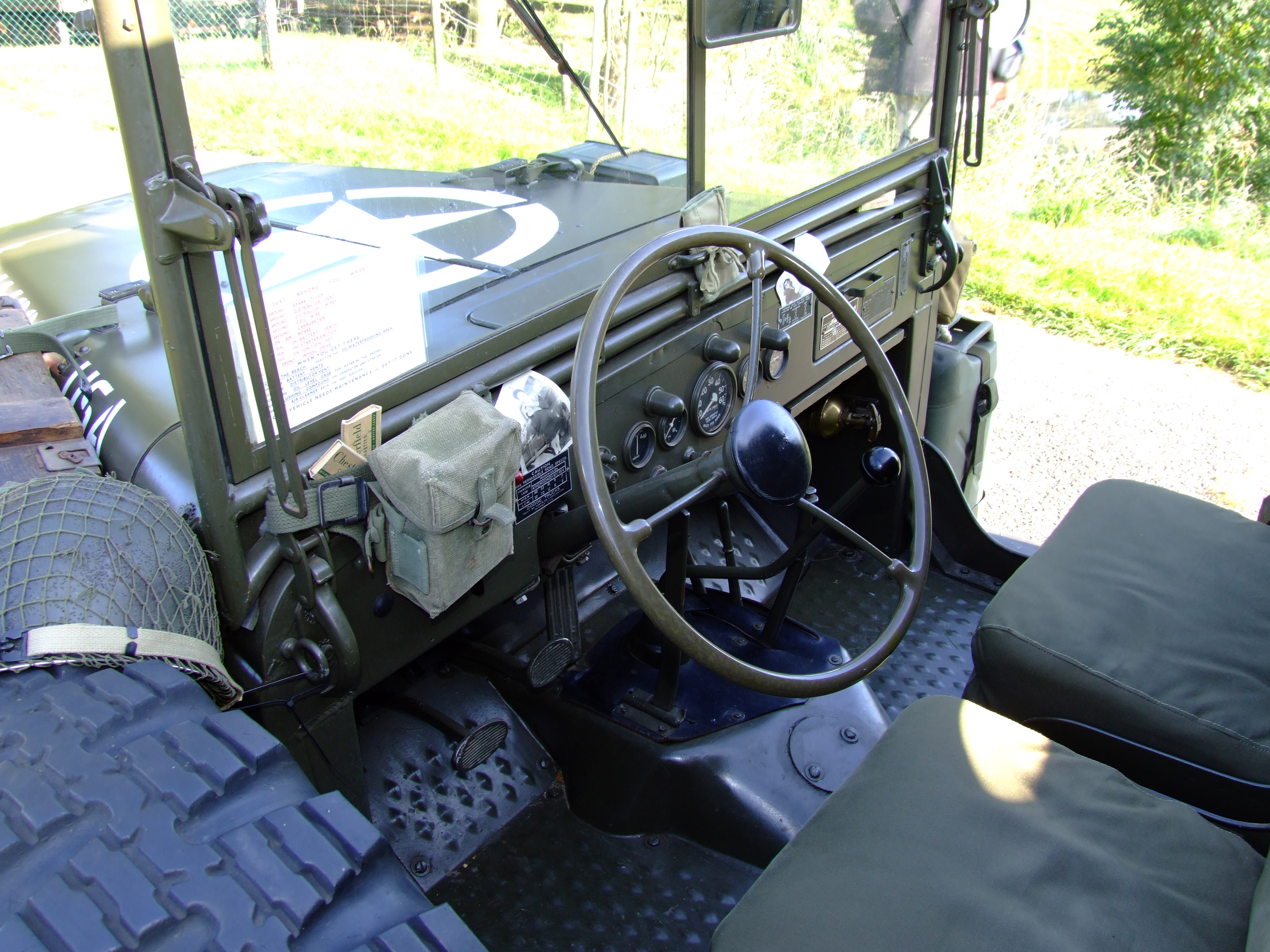
WC-62 / WC-63 cabin interior

=== WC-62 ===
The G-507 Cargo and Personnel Carrier, 1 1/2-ton, 6×6 Truck, Dodge (WC-62 w/o Winch) was based on a lengthened WC-51 Weapons Carrier with an extra axle added. When the U.S. Army enlarged rifle squads from eight to twelve men, the 3/4‑ton no longer sufficed, and a 48-inch (1.22 m) longer 6×6 variant was created that used most of the mechanical parts and the whole front sheet metal and cabin of the G-502. The G-507 trucks could be driven by all six wheels (6×6) or by the four rear wheels only (6×4).

A number of components needed further strengthening in this design, and many of these reinforcements were also incorporated in subsequent 3/4‑tons production – both making these even more robust, as well as benefiting the spare parts and supply-chain, by keeping the most future parts suitable and interchangeable on the 3/4‑tons and the 1 1/2‑tons. Six-wheel drive production amounted to 43,224 units total, — 23,092 WC-62 units without winch, and 20,132 WC-63 variants with winch. One prototype was produced as an armored car.

A total of 6,344 WC-62 and WC-63 cargo trucks were provided to World War II Allies — 4,074 to the Free French forces, 2,123 to British, and 137 units to Brazil.

- Length: 17 ft 11 in (5.47 m)
- Width: 6 ft 11 in (2.11 m)
- Height (with canvas cover): 7 ft 3 in (2.21 m)
- Height (with top down): 5 ft 2 in (1.57 m)
- Weight: 6,925 lb (3,141 kg)
- Payload: 3,300 lb (1,500 kg)

=== WC-63 ===
The WC-63 Truck, Cargo and Personnel Carrier, 1 1/2 ton, 6×6 with Winch, Dodge (G-507) Weapons Carrier was based on a lengthened WC-52 with an extra axle added. Identical to the WC-62 but fitted with a PTO-powered Braden MU2 winch, initially of 5,000 lb (2,300 kg), later 7,500 lb (3,400 kg) capacity.

- Length: 18 ft 9 in (5.72 m)
- Width: 6 ft 11 in (2.10 m)
- Height (with canvas cover): 7 ft 3 in (2.21 m)
- Height (with top down): 5 ft 2 in (1.57 m)
- Weight: 7,175 lb (3,250 kg)
- Payload: 3,300 lb (1500 kg)

== Comprehensive models table ==
The table below lists the comprehensive set of models in the Dodge WC series family showing the different codes that were assigned together with each model's core specifications. (Note: Based on the Ordnance Corps' SNL G-657 Dodge Master Parts List (1943), U.S. Army technical model manuals: the TM9-2800 (1943) and 1947 editions) and others, and the U.S. Summary Report of Tank Automotive Acceptances (1940–45).)

Different colors have been used to code groupings for maximum convenience, based on nominal payload rating, model family, and wheels and drive.

Lend-lease models (mainly for Russia), and Canadian-built models are presented in red, at the bottom.

Table of Dodge VC and WC series vehicles, codes and specifications
| Payload rating | Dodge model | US Army SNL-nr. | Dodge T-code | Wheels & drive | U.S. Mil. body code | Model and body description | Winch | Years | Number built | Wheel base | Length | Width | Height | Payload |
|---|---|---|---|---|---|---|---|---|---|---|---|---|---|---|
| 1/2-ton | VC-1 | G-505 | T-202 | 4×4 | USM-BT-15 | Command reconnaissance | | 1940 | 2,155 | 116 in (2.95 m) | 188 in (4.78 m) | 74 in (1.88 m) | 83 3/8 in (2.12 m) | 945 lb (429 kg) |
| 1/2-ton | VC-2 | G-505 | T-202 | 4×4 | USM-BT-15 | Radio command reconnaissance | | 1940 | 34 | 116 in (2.95 m) | 188 in (4.78 m) | 74 in (1.88 m) | 83 3/8 in (2.12 m) | |
| 1/2-ton | VC-3 | G-505 | T-202 | 4×4 | USM-BT-5 | Pick-up, closed cab, with troop seats | | 1940 | 816 | 116 in (2.95 m) | 188 in (4.78 m) | 74 in (1.88 m) | 88 in (2.24 m) | |
| 1/2-ton | VC-4 | G-505 | T-202 | 4×4 | USM-BT-5 | Pick-up, closed cab, no bed seats | | 1940 | 4 | 116 in (2.95 m) | 188 in (4.78 m) | 74 in (1.88 m) | 88 in (2.24 m) | |
| 1/2-ton | VC-5 | G-505 | T-202 | 4×4 | USM-BT-9 | Pick-up, open cab / Weapon Carrier; transverse seats | | 1940 | 1,607 | 116 in (2.95 m) | 188 in (4.78 m) | 74 in (1.88 m) | 88 in (2.24 m) | |
| 1/2-ton | VC-6 | G-505 | T-202 | 4×4 | USM-BT-7 | Carry-all | | 1940 | 24 | 116 in (2.95 m) | | 74 in (1.88 m) | 84 1/8 in (2.14 m) | |
| 1/2-ton | WC-1 | G-505 | T-207 | 4×4 | USM-BT-6 | Pick-up, closed cab; longitudinal seats | | 1941 | 2,573 | 116 in (2.95 m) | 181 1/16 in (4.60 m) | 75 13/16 in (1.93 m) | 88.2 in (2.24 m) | 1000 lb / 1300 lb (Note: Ratings given in Technical Manual TM9-2800 editions of 1943 and 1947, respectively.) |
| 1/2-ton | WC-3 | G-505 | T-207 | 4×4 | USM-BT-10 | Pick-up, open cab / Weapon Carrier; transverse seats | | 1941 | 7,808 | 116 in (2.95 m) | 181 1/16 in (4.60 m) | 75 13/16 in (1.93 m) | 88 1/8 in (2.24 m) | 1,000 lb (450 kg) |
| 1/2-ton | WC-4 | G-505 | T-207 | 4×4 | USM-BT-10 | Pick-up, open cab / Weapon Carrier; transverse seats | w / winch | 1941 | 5,570 | 116 in (2.95 m) | 191 5/16 in (4.86 m) | 75 13/16 in (1.93 m) | 88 1/8 in (2.24 m) | 1,000 lb (450 kg) |
| 1/2-ton | WC-5 | G-505 | T-207 | 4×4 | USM-BT-6 | Pick-up, closed cab; no bed seating | | 1941 | 60 | 116 in (2.95 m) | 181 1/16 in (4.60 m) | 75 13/16 in (1.93 m) | 88.2 in (2.24 m) | 1000 lb / 1300 lb |
| 1/2-ton | WC-6 | G-505 | T-207 | 4×4 | USM-BT-17 | Command reconnaissance | | 1941 | 9,365 | 116 in (2.95 m) | 178 11/16 in (4.54 m) | 75 13/16 in (1.93 m) | 83 3/8 in (2.12 m) | 1,000 lb (450 kg) |
| 1/2-ton | WC-7 | G-505 | T-207 | 4×4 | USM-BT-17 | Command reconnaissance | w / winch | 1941 | 1,438 | 116 in (2.95 m) | 189 3/16 in (4.81 m) | 75 13/16 in (1.93 m) | 83 3/8 in (2.12 m) | 700 lb (320 kg) |
| 1/2-ton | WC-8 | G-505 | T-207 | 4×4 | USM-BT-17 | Radio command reconnaissance | | 1941 | 548 | 116 in (2.95 m) | 178 11/16 in (4.54 m) | 75 13/16 in (1.93 m) | 83 3/8 in (2.12 m) | 1,000 lb (450 kg) |
| 1/2-ton | WC-9 | G-505 | T-207 | 4×4 | USM-BT-19 | Ambulance | | 1941 | 2,288 | 123 in (3.12 m) | 195 in (4.95 m) | 76 in (1.93 m) | 90 in (2.29 m) | 1,000 lb (450 kg) |
| 1/2-ton | WC-10 | G-505 | T-207 | 4×4 | USM-BT-7 | Carry-all | | 1941 | 1,643 | 116 in (2.95 m) | 183 7/8 in (4.67 m) | 75 13/16 in (1.93 m) | 84 1/8 in (2.14 m) | 1,000 lb (450 kg) |
| 1/2-ton | WC-11 | G-505 | T-207 | 4×4 | USM-BT-13 | Panel van | | 1941 | 642 | 116 in (2.95 m) | 183 7/8 in (4.67 m) | 75 13/16 in (1.93 m) | 84 1/8 in (2.14 m) | 1,000 lb (450 kg) |
| 1/2-ton | WC-12 | G-505 | T-211 | 4×4 | USM-BT-6 | Pick-up, closed cab | | 1941 | 6,047 | 116 in (2.95 m) | 181 1/16 in (4.60 m) | 75 13/16 in (1.93 m) | 88.2 in (2.24 m) | 1000 lb / 1300 lb |
| 1/2-ton | WC-13 | G-505 | T-211 | 4×4 | USM-BT-10 | Pick-up, open cab / Weapon Carrier | | 1941 | 4,019 | 116 in (2.95 m) | 181 1/16 in (4.60 m) | 75 13/16 in (1.93 m) | 88 1/8 in (2.24 m) | 1000 lb / 1300 lb |
| 1/2-ton | WC-14 | G-505 | T-211 | 4×4 | USM-BT-6 | Pick-up, closed cab / Emergency Repair (Note: According to both contract and acceptance count in Summary Report) | | 1941 | 268 | 116 in (2.95 m) | 181 1/16 in (4.60 m) | 75 13/16 in (1.93 m) | 88.2 in (2.24 m) | 1000 lb / 1300 lb |
| 1/2-ton | WC-15 | G-505 | T-211 | 4×4 | USM-BT-17 | Command reconnaissance | | 1941 | 3,980 | 116 in (2.95 m) | 178 11/16 in (4.54 m) | 75 13/16 in (1.93 m) | 83 3/8 in (2.12 m) | 1,000 lb (450 kg) |
| 1/2-ton | WC-16 | G-505 | T-211 | 4×4 | USM-BT-17 | Radio command reconnaissance | | 1941 | 1,284 | 116 in (2.95 m) | 178 11/16 in (4.54 m) | 75 13/16 in (1.93 m) | 83 3/8 in (2.12 m) | 1,000 lb (450 kg) |
| 1/2-ton | WC-17 | G-505 | T-211 | 4×4 | USM-BT-7 | Carry-all | | 1941 | 274 | 116 in (2.95 m) | 183 7/8 in (4.67 m) | 75 13/16 in (1.93 m) | 84 1/8 in (2.14 m) | 1,000 lb (450 kg) |
| 1/2-ton | WC-18 | G-505 | T-211 | 4×4 | USM-BT-19 | Ambulance | | 1941 | 1,555 | 123 in (3.12 m) | 195 in (4.95 m) | 76 in (1.93 m) | 90 in (2.29 m) | 1,000 lb (450 kg) |
| 1/2-ton | WC-19 | G-505 | T-211 | 4×4 | USM-BT-13 | Panel van | | 1941 | 103 | 116 in (2.95 m) | 183 7/8 in (4.67 m) | 75 13/16 in (1.93 m) | 84 1/8 in (2.14 m) | 1,000 lb (450 kg) |
| 1/2-ton | WC-20 | G-061 | T-211 | 4×4 | USM-BT-1 | Emergency repair, M1, Closed cab chassis | | 1941 | 30 | 123 in (3.12 m) | 187 3/8 in (4.76 m) | 91 1/2 in (2.32 m) | 81 1/16 in (2.06 m) | 1420 lb / 2170 lb |
| 1/2-ton | WC-21 | G-505 | T-215 | 4×4 | USM-BT-10 | Pick-up, open cab / Weapon Carrier; transverse seats | | 1941–1942 | 14,287 | 116 in (2.95 m) | 181 1/16 in (4.60 m) | 75 13/16 in (1.93 m) | 88 1/8 in (2.24 m) | 1000 lb / 1300 lb |
| 1/2-ton | WC-22 | G-505 | T-215 | 4×4 | USM-BT-10 | Pick-up, open cab / Weapon Carrier | w / winch | 1941 | 1,900 | 116 in (2.95 m) | 191 5/16 in (4.86 m) | 75 13/16 in (1.93 m) | 88 1/8 in (2.24 m) | 1000 lb / 1300 lb |
| 1/2-ton | WC-23 | G-505 | T-215 | 4×4 | USM-BT-17 | Command reconnaissance | | 1941–1942 | 2,637 | 116 in (2.95 m) | 178 11/16 in (4.54 m) | 75 13/16 in (1.93 m) | 83 3/8 in (2.12 m) | 1000 lb / 1300 lb |
| 1/2-ton | WC-24 | G-505 | T-215 | 4×4 | USM-BT-17 | Command reconnaissance | w / winch | 1941–1942 | 1,412 | 116 in (2.95 m) | 189 3/16 in (4.81 m) | 75 13/16 in (1.93 m) | 83 3/8 in (2.12 m) | 700 lb / 1300 lb |
| 1/2-ton | WC-25 | G-505 | T-215 | 4 × 4 | USM-BT-17 | Radio command reconnaissance | | 1941–1942 | 1,630 | 116 in (2.95 m) | 178 11/16 in (4.54 m) | 75 13/16 in (1.93 m) | 83 3/8 in (2.12 m) | 1000 lb / 1300 lb |
| 1/2-ton | WC-26 | G-505 | T-215 | 4 × 4 | USM-BT-7 | Carry-all | | 1941–1942 | 2,900 | 116 in (2.95 m) | 183 7/8 in (4.67 m) | 75 13/16 in (1.93 m) | 84 1/8 in (2.14 m) | 1000 lb / 1300 lb |
| 1/2-ton | WC-27 | G-505 | T-215 | 4×4 | USM-BT-19 | Ambulance | | 1941–1942 | 2,579 | 123 in (3.12 m) | 195 in (4.95 m) | 76 in (1.93 m) | 90 in (2.29 m) | 1,300 lb (590 kg) |
| 1/2-ton | WC-36 | G-613 | T-112 | 4×2 | USM-BT-7 | Carry-all | | 1941 | 400 | 116 in (2.95 m) | 191 3/8 in (4.86 m) | 74.5 in (1.89 m) | 80 in (2.03 m) | 1,000 lb (450 kg) |
| 1/2-ton | WC-37 | G-613 | T-112 | 4×2 | USM-BT-14* | Panel van — VC model civilian body | | 1941 | 6 | 116 in (2.95 m) | 183 7/8 in (4.67 m) | 75 13/16 in (1.93 m) | 84 1/8 in (2.14 m) | 1,000 lb (450 kg) |
| 1/2-ton | WC-38 | G-613 | T-112 | 4×2 | USM-BT-5* | Pick-up, closed cab – VC model civilian body | | 1941 | 362 | 116 in (2.95 m) | 185 5/16 in (4.71 m) | 74.5 in (1.89 m) | 74 7/16 in (1.89 m) | 1,000 lb (450 kg) |
| 1/2-ton | WC-39 | G-613 | T-112 | 4×2 | USM-BT-12 | Telephone installation, K-50 | | 1941 | 1 | 116 in (2.95 m) | | | | |
| 1/2-ton | WC-40 | G-505 | T-215 | 4×4 | USM-BT-6 | Pick-up, closed cab / Emergency Repair | | 1941 | 275 | 116 in (2.95 m) | 181 1/16 in (4.60 m) | 75 13/16 in (1.93 m) | 88.2 in (2.24 m) | 1000 lb / 1300 lb |
| 1/2-ton | WC-41^{A} | G-505 | T-215 | 4×4 | USM-BT-6 | Pick-up, closed cab / Emergency Repair | | 1941 | 39 | 116 in (2.95 m) | 181 1/16 in (4.60 m) | 75 13/16 in (1.93 m) | 88.2 in (2.24 m) | 1000 lb / 1300 lb |
| 1/2-ton | WC-41^{B} | G-061 | T-215 | 4×4 | USM-BT-1 | Emergency repair, M1, Closed cab chassis | | 1941–1942 | 306 | 123 in (3.12 m) | 187 3/8 in (4.76 m) | 91 1/2 in (2.32 m) | 81 1/16 in (2.06 m) | 1420 lb / 2170 lb |
| 1/2-ton | WC-42 | G-505 | T-215 | 4×4 | USM-BT-13 | Radio – Panel van | | 1942 | 650 | 116 in (2.95 m) | 183 7/8 in (4.67 m) | 75 13/16 in (1.93 m) | 84 1/8 in (2.14 m) | 1000 lb / 1300 lb |
| 1/2-ton | WC-43 | G-505 | T-215 | 4×4 | USM-BT-12 | Telephone installation, K-50 | | 1942 | 370 | 116 in (2.95 m) | | | | |
| 1/2-ton | WC-47 | G-613 | T-112 | 4×2 | USM-BT-5* | Pick-up, closed cab — VC model civilian body | | 1942 | 390 | 116 in (2.95 m) | 185 5/16 in (4.71 m) | 74.5 in (1.89 m) | 74 7/16 in (1.89 m) | 1,000 lb (450 kg) |
| 1/2-ton | WC-48 | G-613 | T-112 | 4×2 | USM-BT-7 | Carry-all | | 1942 | 374 | 116 in (2.95 m) | 191 3/8 in (4.86 m) | 74.5 in (1.89 m) | 80 in (2.03 m) | 1,000 lb (450 kg) |
| 1/2-ton | WC-49 | G-613 | T-112 | 4×2 | USM-BT-14* | Panel van — VC model civilian body | | 1942 | 8 | 116 in (2.95 m) | 183 7/8 in (4.67 m) | 75 13/16 in (1.93 m) | 84 1/8 in (2.14 m) | 1,000 lb (450 kg) |
| 1/2-ton | WC-50 | G-613 | T-112 | 4×2 | USM-BT-12 | Telephone installation, K-50 | | 1942 | 1 | 116 in (2.95 m) | | | | |
| 3/4-ton | WC-51 | G-502 | T-214 | 4×4 | USM-BT-11 | Pick-up, open cab / Weapon Carrier | | 1942–1945 | 123,541 | 98 in (2.49 m) | 166 7/8 in (4.24 m) | 82 3/4 in (2.10 m) | 81 7/8 in (2.08 m) | 1,500 lb (680 kg) |
| 3/4-ton | WC-52 | G-502 | T-214 | 4×4 | USM-BT-11 | Pick-up, open cab / Weapon Carrier | w / winch | 1942–1945 | 59,114 | 98 in (2.49 m) | 176.5 in (4.48 m) | 82 3/4 in (2.10 m) | 81 7/8 in (2.08 m) | 1,500 lb (680 kg) |
| 3/4-ton | WC-53 | G-502 | T-214 | 4×4 | USM-BT-8 | Carry-all | | 1942–1943 | 8,400 | 114 in (2.90 m) | 185 5/8 in (4.71 m) | 78 5/8 in (2.00 m) | 80 1/4 in (2.04 m) | 1,800 lb (820 kg) |
| 3/4-ton | WC-54 | G-502 | T-214 | 4×4 | USM-BT-20 | Ambulance | | 1942–1944 | 26,002 | 121 in (3.07 m) | 194.5 in (4.94 m) | 77 3/4 in (1.97 m) | 90 3/8 in (2.30 m) | 1,800 lb (820 kg) |
| 3/4-ton | WC-55 | G-121 | T-214 | 4×4 | USM-BT-11 | Pick-up, open cab "M6 gun motor carriage" | w / winch | 1942 | 5,380 | 98 in (2.49 m) | 178 in (4.52 m) | 88 in (2.24 m) | 82 in (2.08 m) | 1,200 lb (540 kg) |
| 3/4-ton | WC-56 | G-502 | T-214 | 4×4 | USM-BT-16 | Command reconnaissance | | 1942–1944 | 21,156 | 98 in (2.49 m) | 165 3/4 in (4.21 m) | 78 5/8 in (2.00 m) | 81.5 in (2.07 m) | 1500 lb / 1800 lb |
| 3/4-ton | WC-57 | G-502 | T-214 | 4×4 | USM-BT-16 | Command reconnaissance | w / winch | 1942–1944 | 6,010 | 98 in (2.49 m) | 175 5/8 in (4.46 m) | 78 5/8 in (2.00 m) | 81.5 in (2.07 m) | 1500 lb / 1800 lb |
| 3/4-ton | WC-58 | G-502 | T-214 | 4 × 4 | USM-BT-16 | Radio command reconnaissance | unclear | 1942 | 2,344 (Note: Unclear whether 2344 were built in addition to the WC-56/57 units, or whether this number of these were equipped as radio units !) | 98 in (2.49 m) | 165 3/4 in (4.21 m) | 78 5/8 in (2.00 m) | 81.5 in (2.07 m) | 1500 lb / 1800 lb |
| 3/4-ton | WC-59 | G-502 | T-214 | 4 × 4 | USM-BT-21 | Telephone installation, K-50 | | 1942–1943 | 549 | 121 in (3.07 m) | 191.5 in (4.86 m) | 77.5 in (1.97 m) | 80 5/8 in (2.05 m) | 500 lb / 1210 lb |
| 3/4-ton | WC-60 | G-061 | T-214 | 4×4 | USM-BT-22 | Emergency repair, M2, Closed cab chassis | | 1943 | 300 | 121 in (3.07 m) | 186 in (4.72 m) | 81.5 in (2.07 m) | 88.5 in (2.25 m) | 2,170 lb (980 kg) |
| 3/4-ton | WC-61 | G-502 | T-214 | 4×4 | | Phone / Maintenance, K-50B | | 1943 | 58 | 121 in (3.07 m) | 191 13/32 in (4.86 m) | 77 3/4 in (1.97 m) | 80 11/16 in (2.05 m) | 1,300 lb (590 kg) |
| 3/4-ton | WC-64 | G-502 | T-214 | 4×4 | | Ambulance, Knock-down | | 1945 | 3,500 | 121 in (3.07 m) | 191.5 in (4.86 m) | 82 3/4 in (2.10 m) | 90 3/4 in (2.31 m) | 1,500 lb (680 kg) |
| 1 1/2-ton | VF-401 | G-621 | T-203 | 4×4 | USM-BT-3 | Pick-up / cargo, closed cab | | 1940 | 3,122 | 143 in (3.63 m) | 223 3/8 in (5.67 m) | 86 in (2.18 m) | 111 7/8 in (2.84 m) | 3,000 lb (1,400 kg) |
| 1 1/2-ton | VF-402 | G-621 | T-203 | 4×4 | USM-BT-3 | Pick-up / cargo, closed cab | w / winch | 1940 | 491 | 143 in (3.63 m) | 233 1/12 in (5.92 m) | 86 in (2.18 m) | 111 7/8 in (2.84 m) | 2,400 lb (1,100 kg) |
| 1 1/2-ton | VF-403 | G-621 | T-203 | 4×4 | USM-BT-4 | Dump truck, closed cab | | 1940 | 323 | 143 in (3.63 m) | 225 3/32 in (5.72 m) | 85 in (2.16 m) | 113.5 in (2.88 m) | 3,000 lb (1,400 kg) |
| 1 1/2-ton | VF-404 | G-621 | T-203 | 4×4 | USM-BT-3 | Pick-up / cargo, closed cab | | 1940 | 1,956 | 143 in (3.63 m) | 223 3/8 in (5.67 m) | 86 in (2.18 m) | 111 7/8 in (2.84 m) | 3,000 lb (1,400 kg) |
| 1 1/2-ton | VF-405 | G-621 | T-203 | 4×4 | USM-BT-3 | Pick-up / cargo, closed cab | w / winch | 1940 | 509 | 143 in (3.63 m) | 233 1/12 in (5.92 m) | 86 in (2.18 m) | 111 7/8 in (2.84 m) | 2,400 lb (1,100 kg) |
| 1 1/2-ton | VF-406 | G-621 | T-203 | 4×4 | USM-BT-4 | Dump truck, closed cab | | 1940 | 67 | 143 in (3.63 m) | 225 3/32 in (5.72 m) | 85 in (2.16 m) | 113.5 in (2.88 m) | 3,000 lb (1,400 kg) |
| 1 1/2-ton | VF-407 | G-621 | T-203 | 4×4 | USM-BT-18 | Ambulance | | 1940 | 3 | 143 in (3.63 m) | | | | |
| 1 1/2-ton | WC-62 | G-507 | T-223 | 6×6 | USM-BT-25/26 | (Personnel and) Cargo Carrier | | 1943–1945 | 23,092 | 125 in (3.18 m) (Note: 104 in (2.64 m) + 42 in (1.07 m)) | 214 7/8 in (5.46 m) | 82 3/4 in (2.10 m) | 89 3/4 in / 84 3/4 in (Note: TM9-810: max. height: tarpaulin up, with / without ringmount; Lowest operable reducible to 62 in (1.57 m)) | 3,300 lb (1,500 kg) |
| 1 1/2-ton | WC-63 | G-507 | T-223 | 6×6 | USM-BT-23/24 | (Personnel and) Cargo Carrier | w / winch | 1943–1945 | 20,132 | 125 in (3.18 m) | 224 3/4 in (5.71 m) | 82 3/4 in (2.10 m) | 89 3/4 in / 84 3/4 in | 3,300 lb (1,500 kg) |
| 1 1/2-ton | T-203B | | T-203-B | 4×4 | Lend-lease | Cargo truck / Lend-Lease to Russia | | 1940 | 1,500 | 160 in (4.06 m) | | | | |
| 1 1/2-ton | WF-32 | G-618 | T-118 | 4×2 | Lend-lease; made in Iran | Closed cab, stake and platform | | 1942–1944 | 9,600 | 160 in (4.06 m) | 253.5 in (6.44 m) | 88 in (2.24 m) | 82 11/16 in (2.10 m) | 3,170 lb (1,440 kg) |
| 1/2-ton | D8A | — | T-212 | 4×4 | Canadian production | Pick-up, open cab / Weapon Carrier | | | 3,001 | 116 in (2.95 m) | | | | |
| 3/4-ton | D3/4 APT | — | T-236 | 4×4 | Canadian production | Pick-up, open cab / Weapon Carrier; Air-Portable | w / winch | 1945 | 11,750 | 98 in (2.49 m) | 182 in (4.62 m) | 77 1/8 in (1.96 m) | 84 in (2.13 m) (Note: Max. height with tarpaulin up; lowest operable: 62 in (1.57 m)) | 1,750 lb (790 kg) |

== Service history ==
Although Chrysler / Dodge supplied over 380,000 WC-series to the war effort – more than the number of MB jeeps actually built by Willys (some 360,000), and the vehicles served with equal versatility – the Dodge WC-series, that were nicknamed "jeeps" by the soldiers, before that moniker subsequently migrated to its quarter-ton brothers, never received any comparable level of fame. The Dodge WC-series have therefore been called one of WW II's unsung heroes. (Note: Anecdotally, contrary to the WW II 1/4‑ton jeeps, the Dodge WC-series was so unknown to German-speaking Wikipedia users, that prior to March 2021 no entry or article about any of the Dodge WC-series family of vehicles existed !)

=== Lend-Lease ===
Almost 60,000 Dodge WC series models were provided to the U.S.' allies of World War II under the Lend-Lease program:

- 650 of the total 1,400 1/2-ton Panel vans built, possibly with radio, went to the British,
- 886 3/4-ton Carry-alls went mainly to the British and the Soviets, with small numbers to various other countries,
- over 2,500 of the total 3,500 WC-64, 3/4-ton knock-down ambulances went primarily to the Free French, the British, and to China,
- some 3,800 3/4-ton WC-56 / WC-57 Command Cars (with or without winch) went mainly to the British, the Free French, and to China,
- plus a further 650 3/4-ton Radio cars, likely WC-58 model, also for the British,
- the bulk of lend-lease Dodges – over 44,000 units – were WC-51 and WC-52 3/4-ton Troops and Weapons Carriers – see their section above,
- and lastly, 6,344 of WC-62 and WC-63 1 1/2-ton, 6×6 Cargo, Troops and Weapons Carriers were provided – mainly to the French (over 4,000), and to the British (over 2,000).

To the Soviets, the almost 25,000 new 1942 all-wheel drive 3/4-ton multi-purpose WC series were so fundamentally innovative, that they fitted no standard Red Army category. Russia much appreciated these vehicles, that perfectly filled the gap between 4WD automobiles and heavy trucks, and simply called them "Dodge three-quarters".

=== Former operators ===
Austria

- Austrian Army

Belgium

- Belgian Army

Brazil

- Used in Brazil by the Brazilian Army and
- in Europe by the Brazilian Expeditionary Force,
  nicknamed as Jipão.

(Free France) France

- Free French Forces, French Army

Greece

- Greek Army and Greek Air Force

Iran

- Iranian Army

Israel

- Israel Defense Forces

Nicaragua

- Guardia Nacional de Nicaragua

Norway

- Norwegian Army

Portugal

- Portuguese Army, redesignated Dodge m/48, used during the Portuguese Colonial War

Philippine Commonwealth

- Philippine Commonwealth Army
- Philippine Constabulary

(Commonwealth of the Philippines) Philippine Republic

- Philippine Army
- Philippine Constabulary
- Philippine Marine Corps

United Kingdom

- Royal Army Medical Corps

United States

- U.S Army, U.S. Army Medical Corps and U.S. Signal Corps

Soviet Union

- Red Army by Lend-Lease during World War II – according to US data: 25,202 Dodge WC series, including 24,902 WC-51 and WC-52 were sent to USSR; according to Soviet data: 19,600 Dodge WC series (Dodge 3/4) were actually delivered and assembled.

At least two survived in running condition in Russian museums:

- Museum of Military History in Padikovo, Istrinsky District, Moscow Oblast.
- Museum of Military and Automobile Technique in Verkhnyaya Pyshma, Sverdlovsk Oblast.

Switzerland

- The Swiss Army bought several hundred after World War II, mainly 3/4‑tons, a few 1/2‑tons, and just ten 1 1/2‑tons. WC-54 ambulances served until 1960.

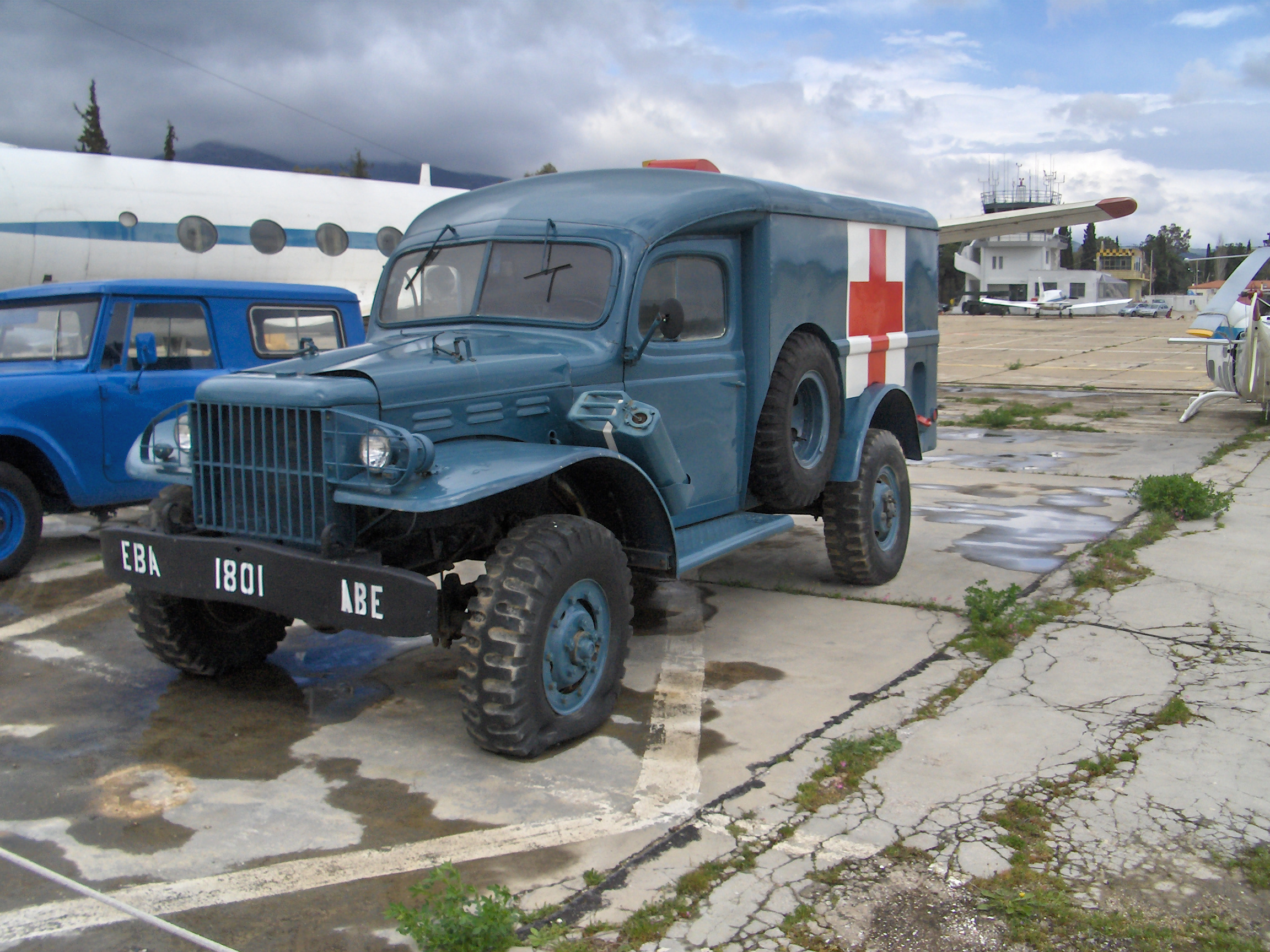
WC-54 ambulance in period Greek Airforce colors

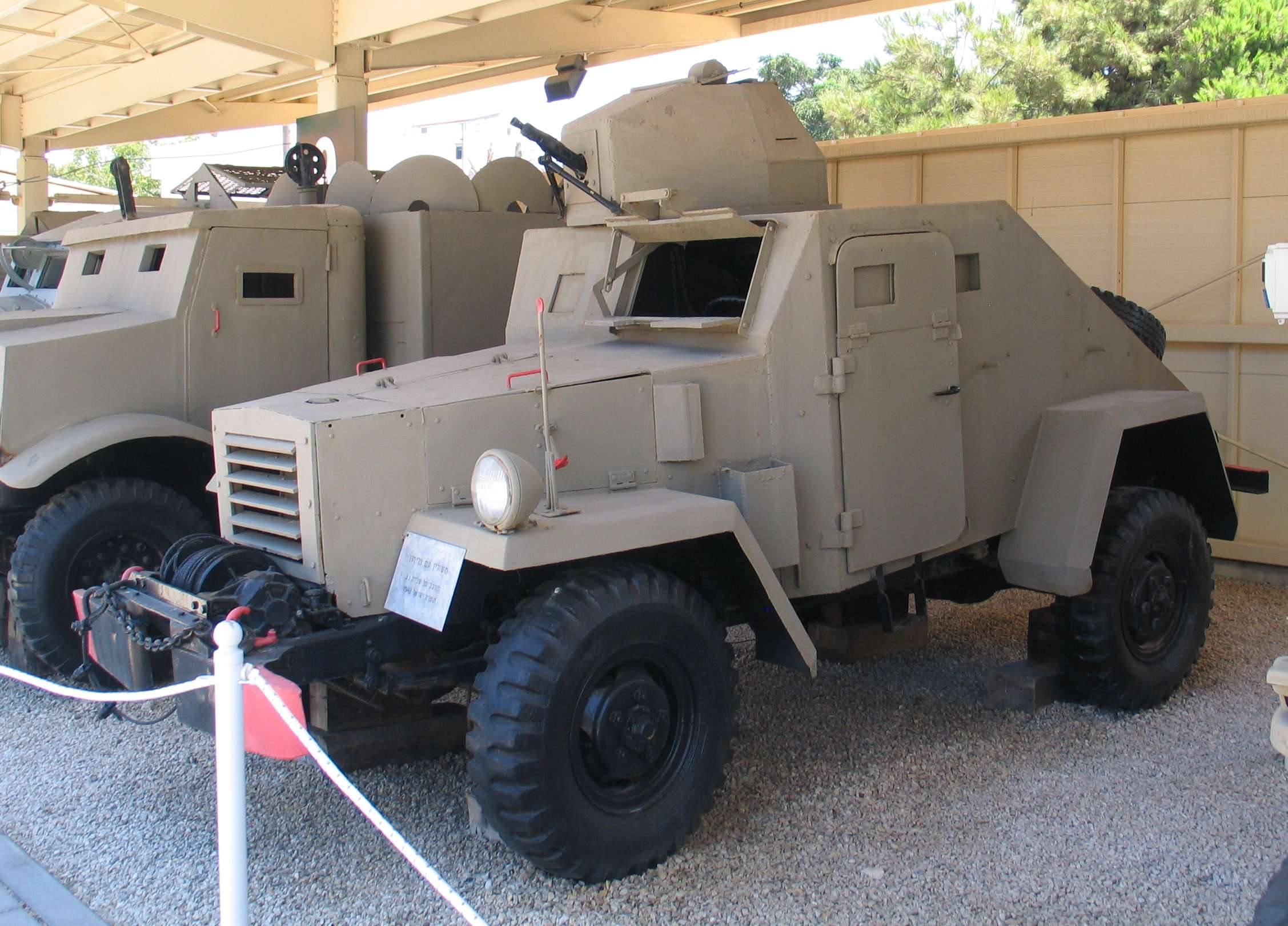
Israel built ad-hoc reconnaissance-assault car with 'sandwich' armor and turret, on the Dodge WC-52 chassis, for the 1948 independence war.

=== Gallery ===
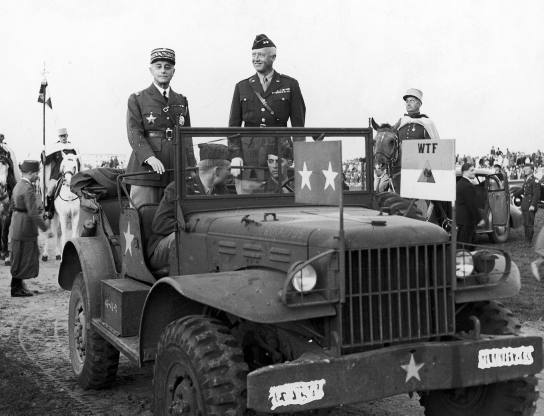
Generals George Patton and Auguste Nogues (Commander-in-Chief in French North Africa) in a WC-56 reviewing troops Dec. 1942

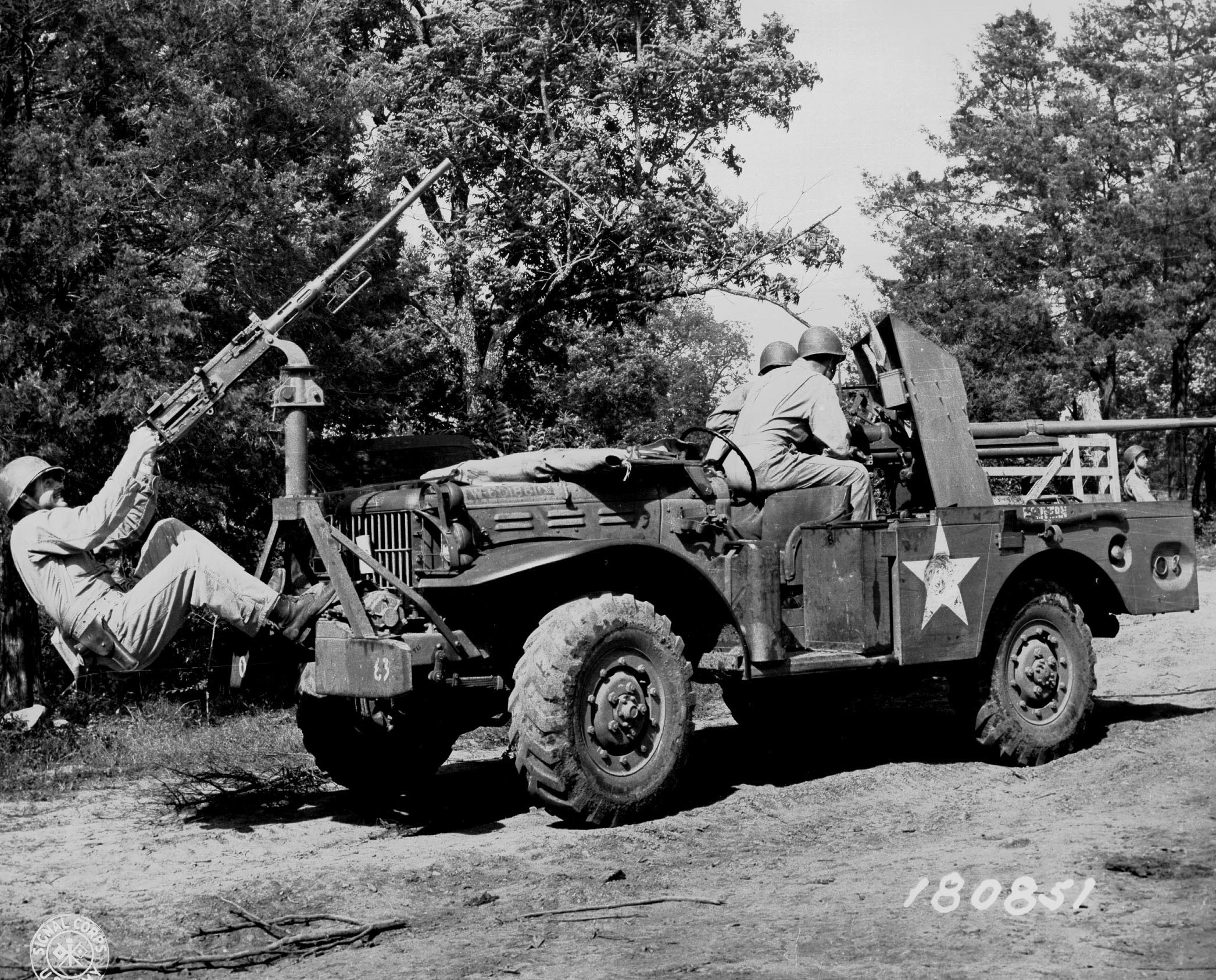
WC-55 in a posed picture showing the M2 heavy machine gun for anti-aircraft use

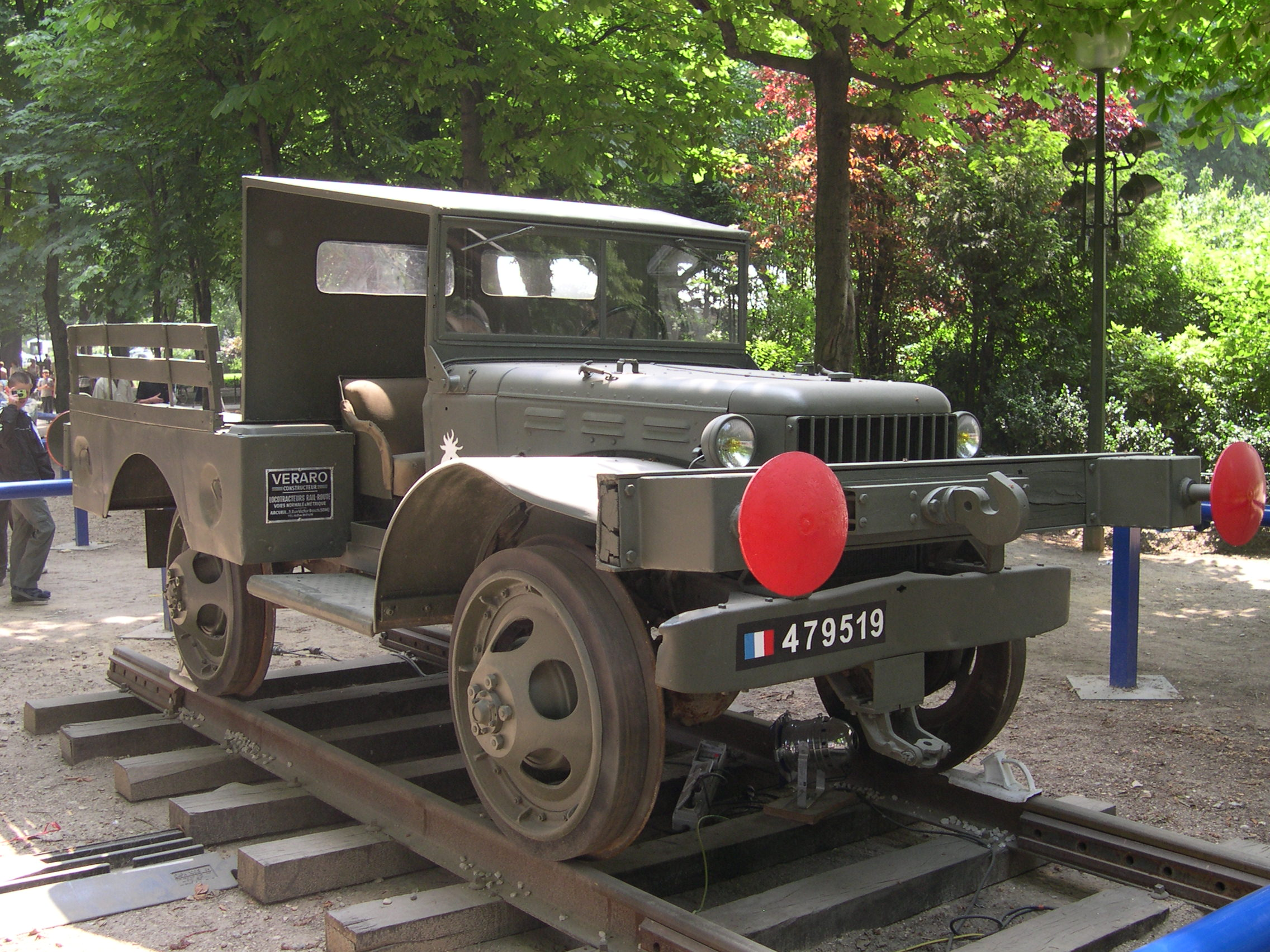
French Army draisine, converted WC-51

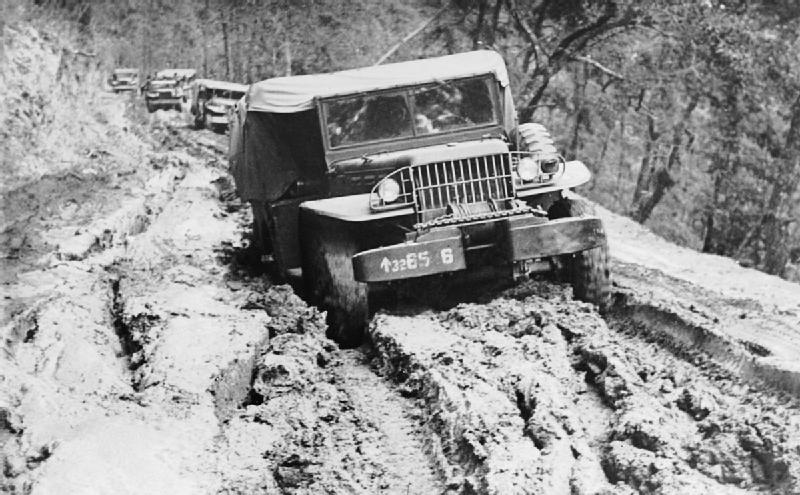
A Dodge of the 5th Indian Division struggling through mud on the Tiddim Front during the Burma campaign, 1941–1945

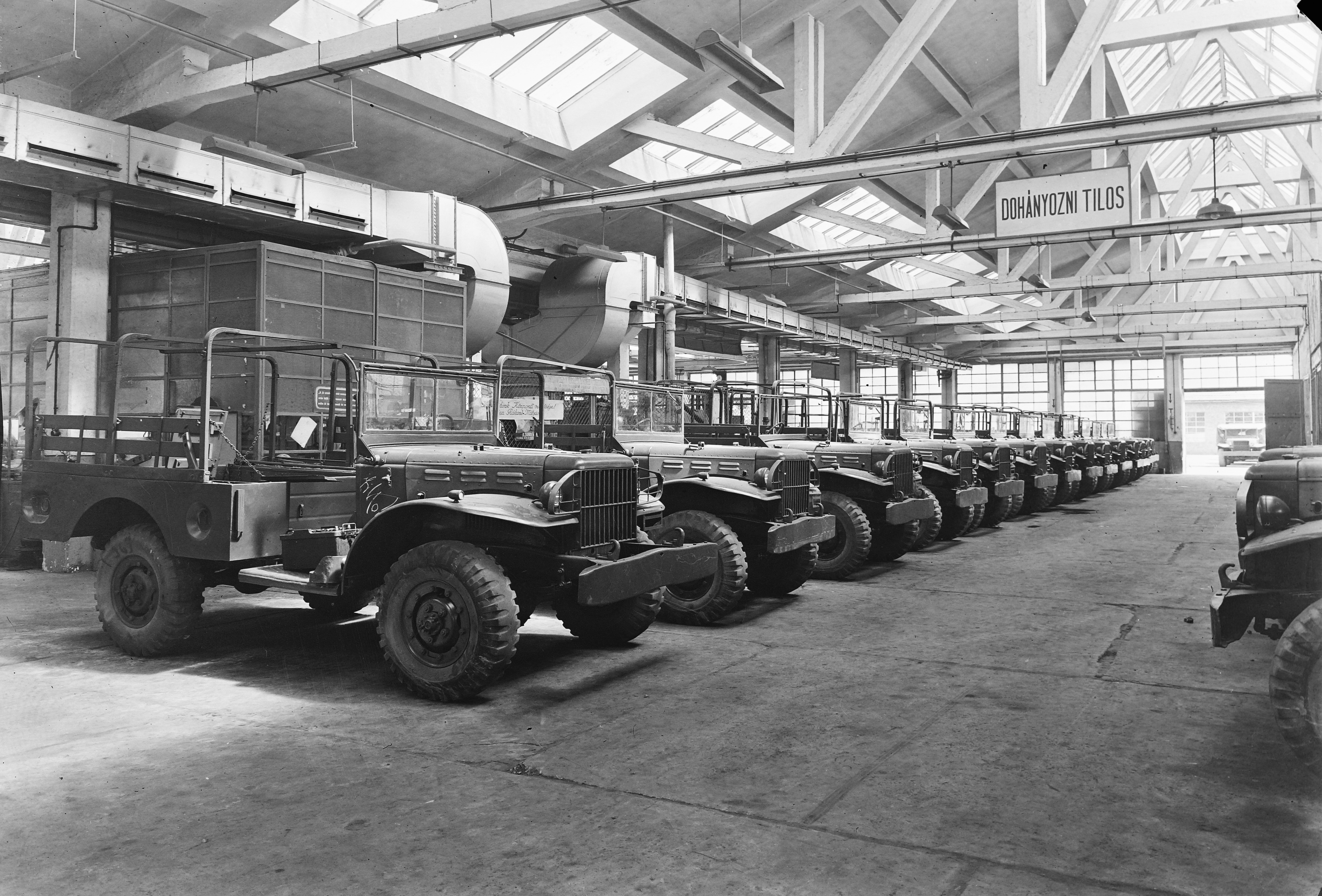
WC-51 'Beeps' served in the Polish and Hungarian armies in the '40s and '50s.

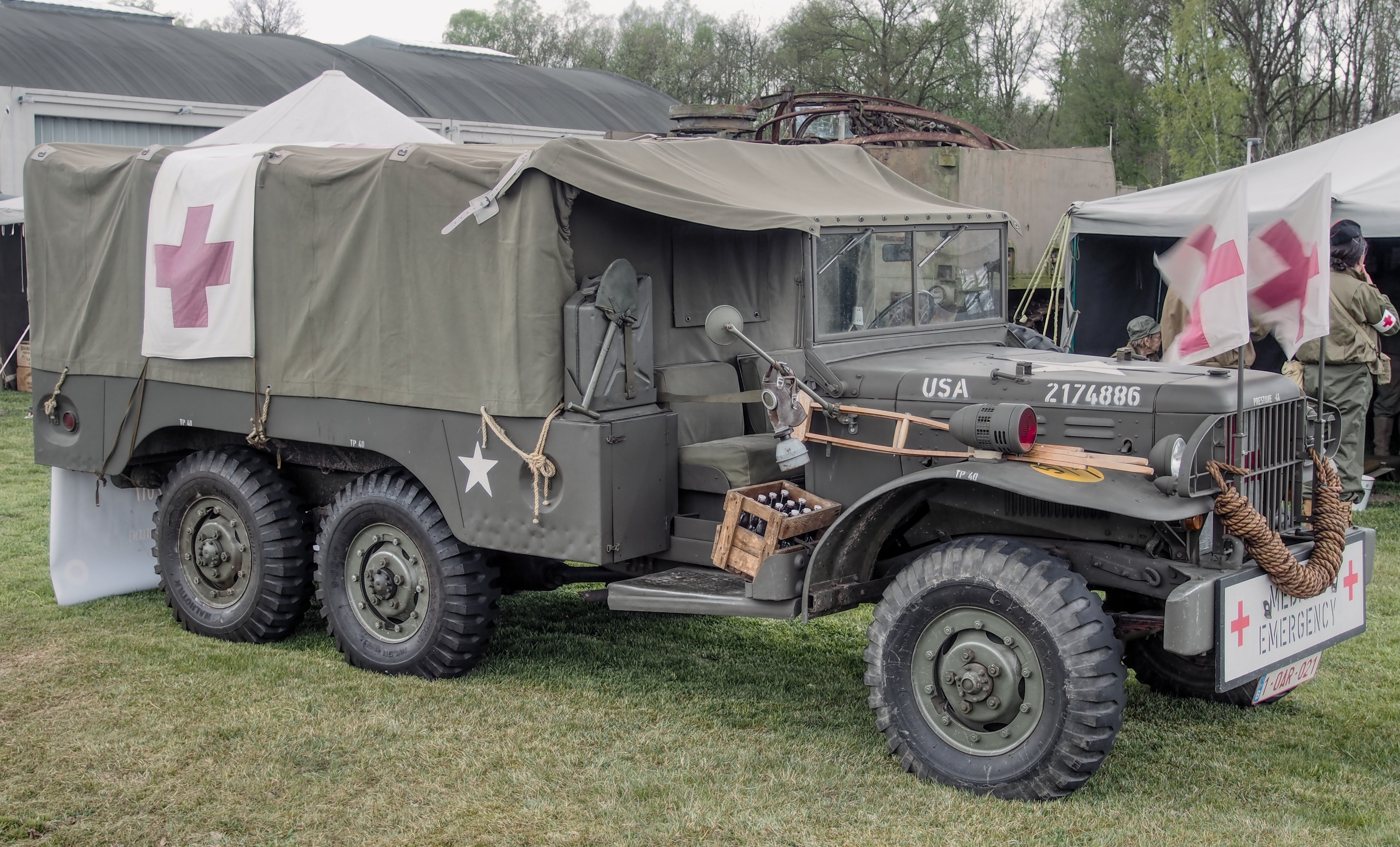
Offering more space also made the stretched G-507 a suitable ambulance (WC-62; reenactment)

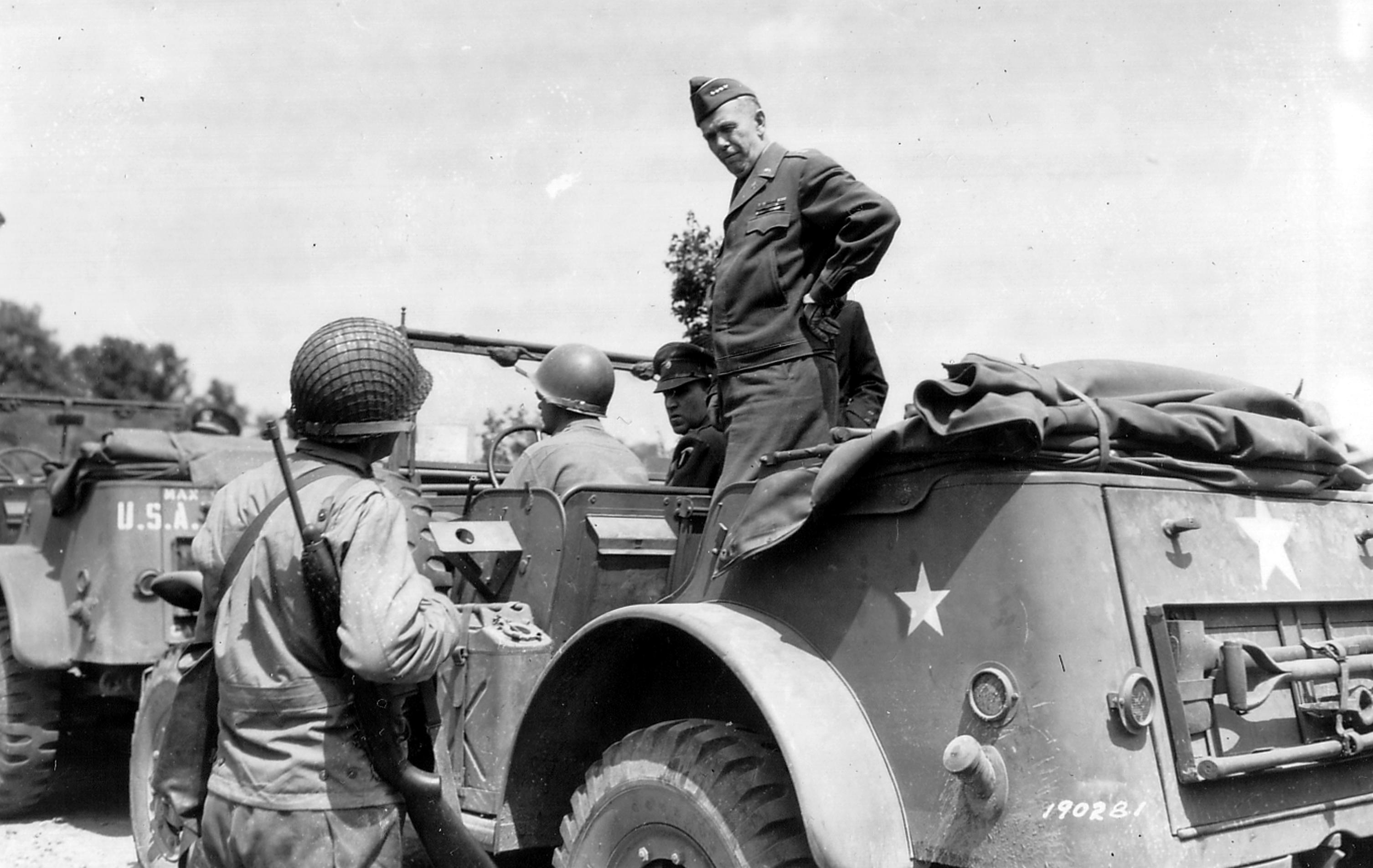
General George C. Marshall in Dodge Command Car, 1944

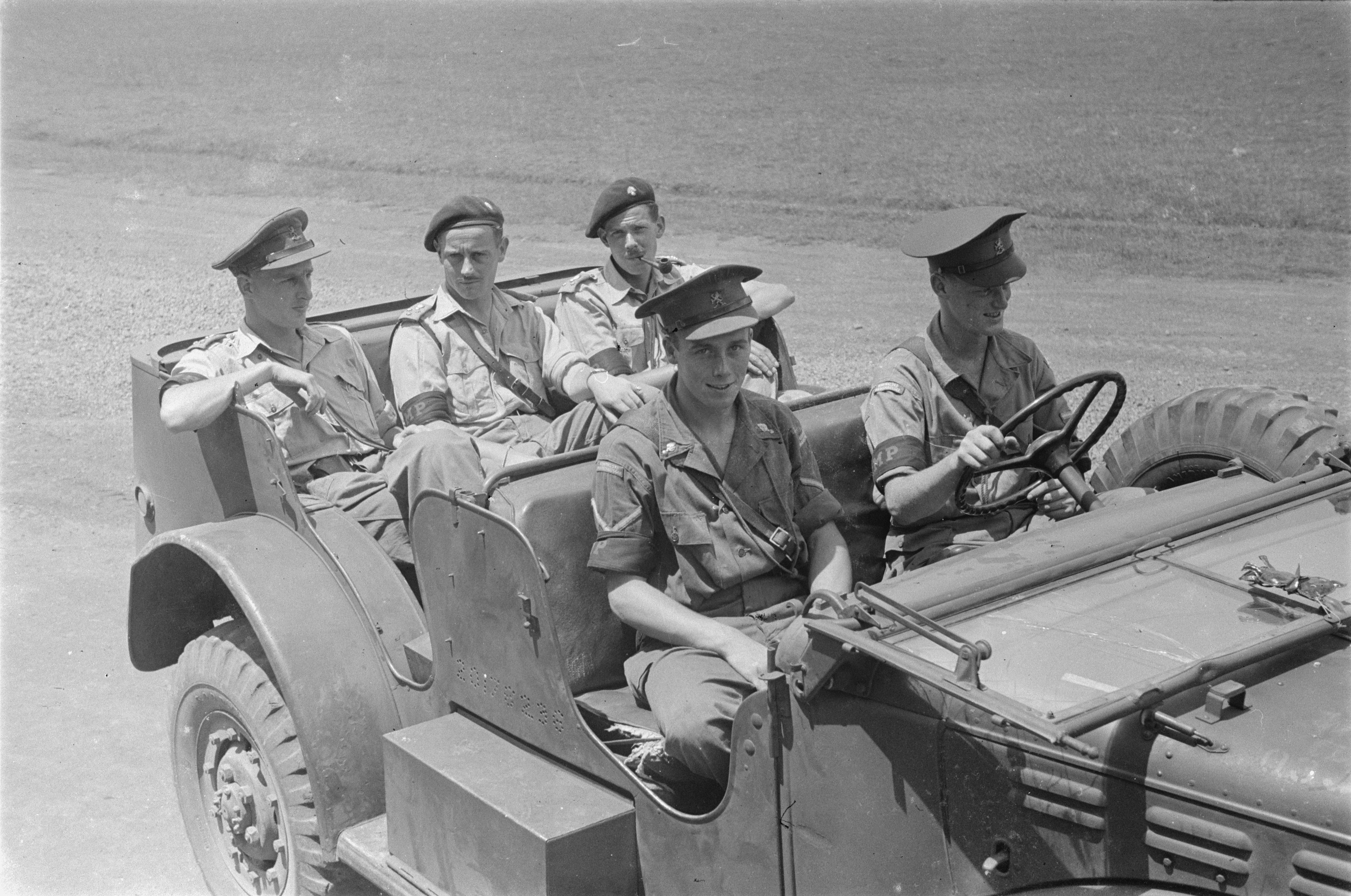
Five Royal Dutch Marechaussee riding in a WC-56/-57 Command Car – 1946, Bogor, West Java, during the Indonesian war of independence.

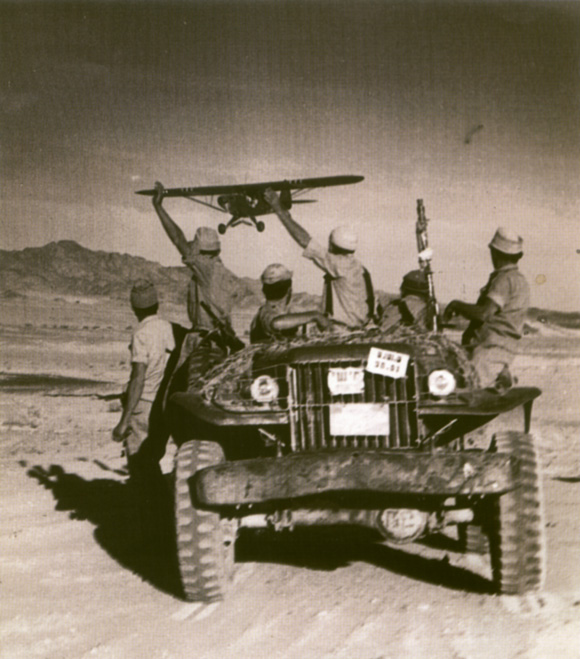
Israeli Defense Forces (IDF) Dodge jeep in the taking of the Sinai peninsula (1956)

== In popular culture ==
Dodge WC series vehicles are visible in many World War II movies, and American TV series. One of the most conspicuous examples is the frequent use of the WC-54 ambulances in the acclaimed M*A*S*H TV series, situated in the Korean War.

In many WW II films, directors would place high-ranking allied officers in Dodge Command Cars, although in reality, the German military quickly realized that personnel riding in the Command Cars were typically prime targets, and Allied generals and dignitaries would in reality prefer to ride in regular jeeps, to prevent advertising themselves as high-profile targets.

It also appears in Oppenheimer, in Los Alamos.

== See also ==
- Canadian Military Pattern truck
- Dodge 3-ton 'Burma' truck
- List of Dodge automobiles
- Einheits-PKW der Wehrmacht – Hitler's 1934 program making Army utility cars on standardized chassis
- Standard nomenclature vehicle G-numbers – G-061, G-121, G-502, G-505, G-507, G-613, G-618, G-621
- Humvee – another U.S. light military wheeled vehicle platform, with many variants built using the same mechanicals
- World War II jeep – the more famous of the two American light wheeled 4WD vehicles, mass-produced for World War II

== General references ==
- Chief of Ordnance Office; Military Vehicle Preservation Association, eds. (2010). Summary Report of Acceptances, Tank-Automotive Materiel, 1940–1945 (1946 Revision). Detroit: U.S. Army Service Forces, Office: Chief of Ordnance-Detroit, Production Division, Requirements and Progress Branch.
- Crismon, Fred W. (2001). US Military Wheeled Vehicles (3 ed.). Victory WWII Pub. pp. 96, 98, 240–241. ISBN 0-970056-71-0.
- Doyle, David (2003). Standard catalog of U.S. Military Vehicles. Iola, Wisconsin: Krause Publications. pp. 45–49, 55–62, 100–101. ISBN 0-87349-508-X.
- Doyle, David (2011). Standard Catalog of U.S. Military Vehicles - 2nd Edition. Iola, Wisconsin: Krause Publications. ISBN 9781440225727.
- Richards, T. and Clarke, R.M. Dodge WW2 military portfolio 1940-45. Brookland Books LTD (Surrey, UK) ISBN 1-85520-533-5
- Ware, Pat (2010). The World Encyclopedia of Military Vehicles. Lorenz Books. pp. 232–233. ISBN 978-0-7548-2052-9.
- SNL G-657 – Master Parts List, Dodge Trucks. Ordnance Corps, U.S. Army Service Forces. December 1, 1943.
- SNL G-657 (pages I–XIX sample), describes all 1940–1943 models by body-types, photos and WC-numbers (PDF). Archived (PDF) from the original on August 3, 2023.
- TM 9-808 – 3/4‑Ton 4×4 Truck (Dodge), Technical Manual (PDF). Washington D.C.: U.S. War Department. January 31, 1944.
- TM 9-810 – 1 1/2-Ton 6×6 Truck (Dodge T-223, models WC-62 and WC-63) (PDF). U.S. War Department. February 28, 1945.
- TM 9-2800 – Standard Military Motor Vehicles. Washington D.C.: U.S. War Department. September 1, 1943.
- TM 9-2800 – MILITARY VEHICLES (PDF). Washington D.C.: Department of the Army. October 27, 1947.
- TM 10-1443 – 1/2 Ton 4 × 4 Dodge Trucks for U.S. Army (PDF). Washington D.C.: U.S. War Department. February 20, 1942.
