= List of the United States military vehicles by supply catalog designation =

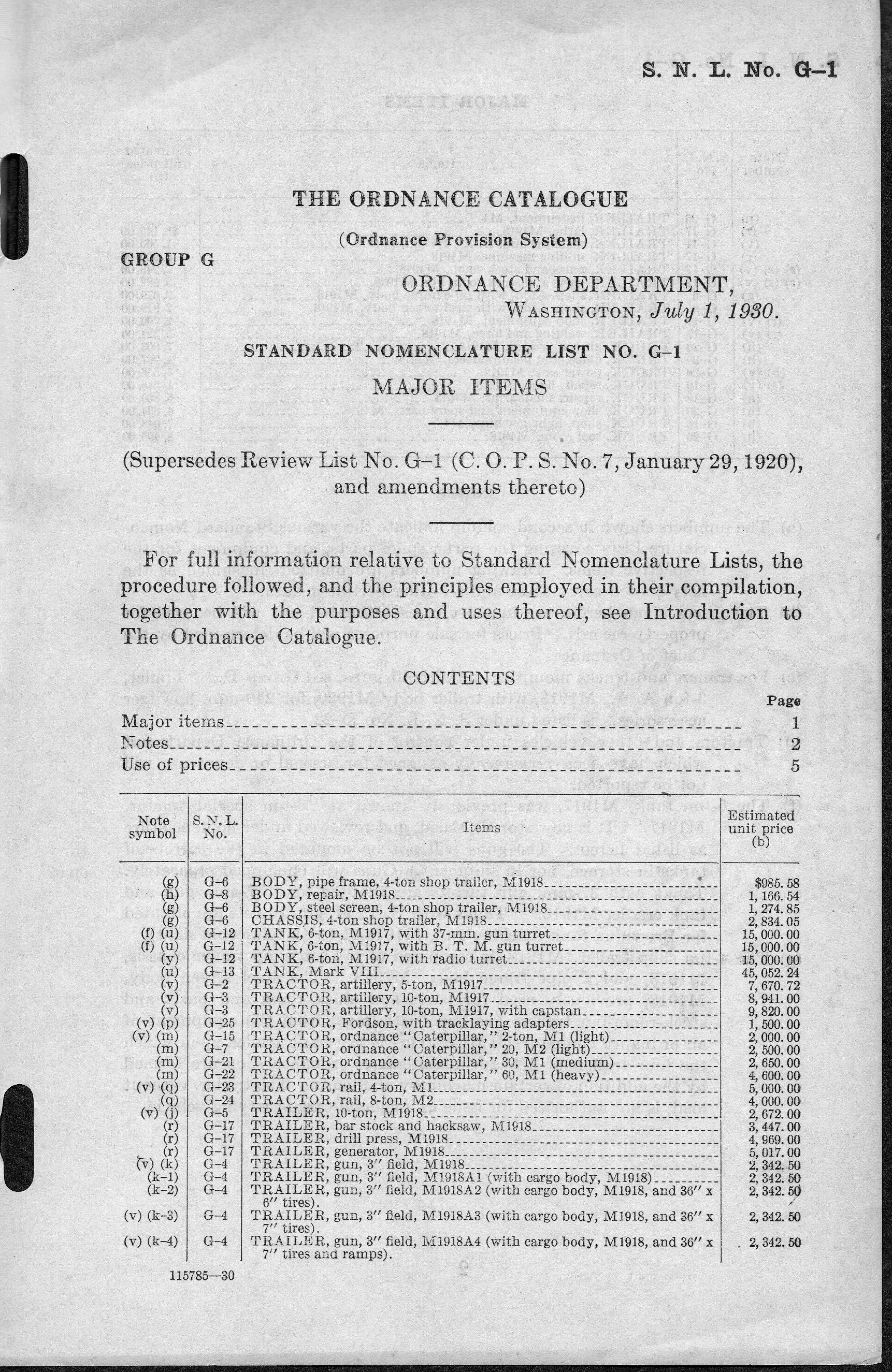
Front cover G1 1930

This is the Group G series List of the United States military vehicles by (Ordnance) supply catalog designation, – one of the alpha-numeric "standard nomenclature lists" (SNL) that were part of the overall list of the United States Army weapons by supply catalog designation, a supply catalog that was used by the United States Army Ordnance Department / Ordnance Corps as part of the Ordnance Provision System, from about the mid-1920s to about 1958.

In this, the Group G series numbers were designated to represent "tank / automotive materiel" – the various military vehicles and directly related materiel. These designations represent vehicles, modules, parts, and catalogs for supply and repair purposes. There can be numerous volumes, changes, and updates under each designation. The Group G list itself is also included, being numbered G-1.

Generally, the G-series codes tended to group together "families" of vehicles that were similar in terms of their engine, transmission, drive train, and chassis, but have external differences. The body style and function of the vehicles within the same G-number may vary greatly.

== Group G scope ==
The July 1943 Ordnance Publications for Supply Index (OPSI); page 68) sums up in detail, the coverage of Group G as:

"Armored, half-track, and scout cars; gun, howitzer, and mortar motor carriages; cargo, mortar, personnel, half-track and universal carriers; armored amphibian, light, medium, and heavy tanks; light, medium, heavy, crane and amphibian/track-type tractors; wheeled tractors; armored, bomb, heavy-duty and tractor crane trailers; tank recovery and tank transporter trailer trucks, with their parts and equipment. Ordnance maintenance bomb service, emergency repair, machine shop and repair trucks, with their parts and equipment. Prime movers, passenger cars, fuel tank trucks, fuel and water tank trailers, and semitrailers; trucks, with stake, platform, dump, and special bodies; amphibian cargo and personnel trucks; motorcycles and side cars."

No numbers in the G-400 to G-499 range were ever used.

== G-1 to G-99 ==
- G-1
  - Major items and major combinations of Group G (catalog). Known editions are:
    - 1 April 1954
    - 4 April 1949
    - 26 April 1944
    - 1 July 1943
    - 7 December 1941?
    - 1 July 1930

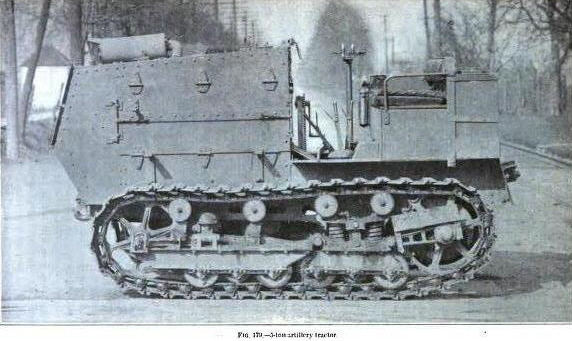
M1917 5-ton tractor

- G-2
  - M1917 artillery tractor, 5-ton, Holt
- G-3
  - M1917 artillery tractor, 10-ton, Holt
- G-4
  - M1918 trailer 3" field gun, 3-inch M1902 field gun
  - M1918A1, w/ 36x7 inch tires
  - M1918A2, w/ sideboards, and 36x6 inch tires
  - M1918A3, w/ sideboards and 36x7 inch tires
  - M1918A4, w/ heavy ramps, and 36x7 inch tires, (for tractors)
- G-5
  - M1918 trailer, 10-ton, tank hauler
- G-6
  - M1918 shop trailer, 4-ton

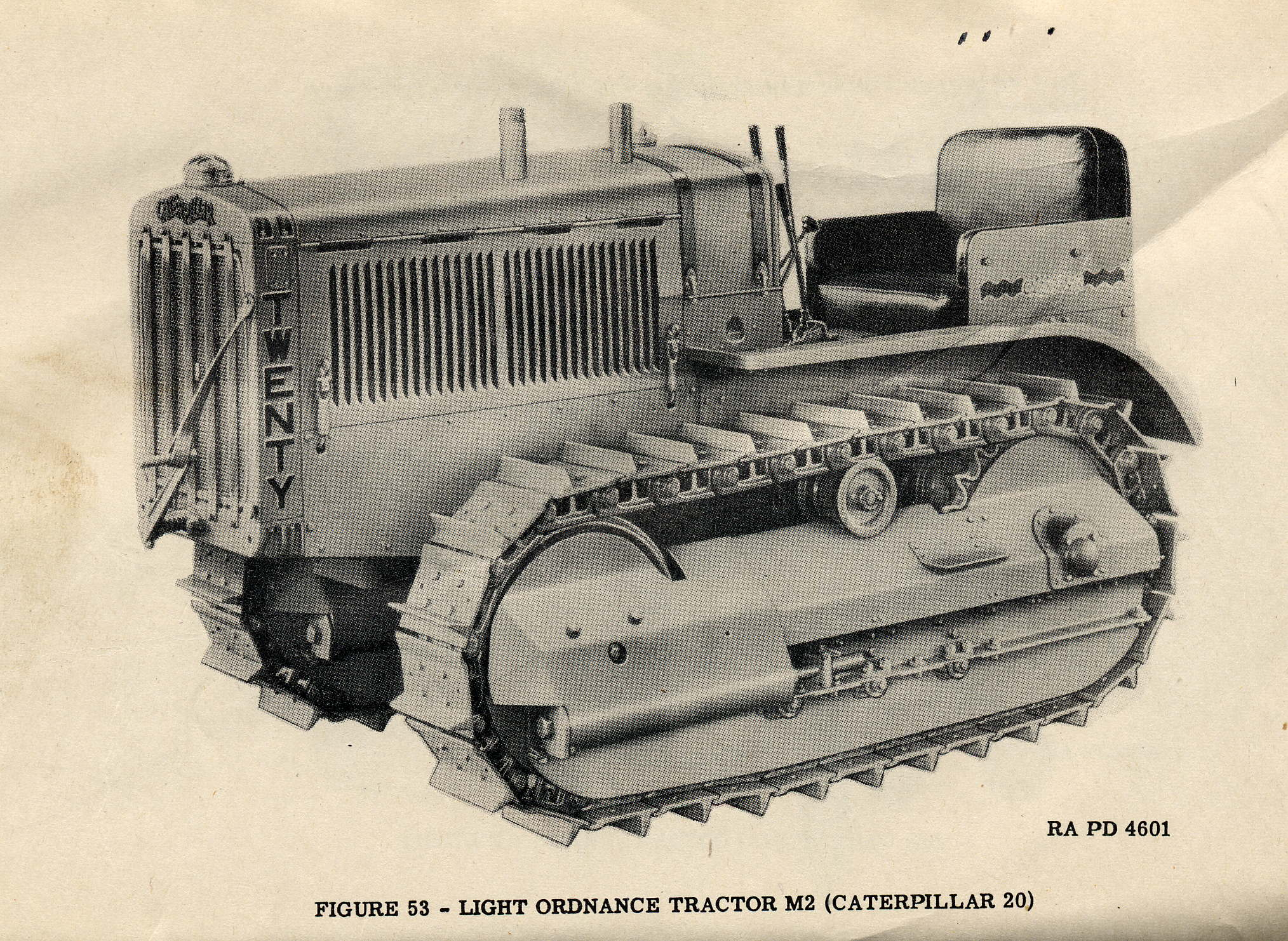
G-7 M2 light tractor Caterpillar model 20

- G-7
  - M2 light tractor, Caterpillar Inc. model 20
- G-8
  - M1918 body repair (3-ton FWD chassis)
- G-9
  - Items common to two or more group G items
- G-10
  - M1918 light repair truck, Dodge
- G-11
  - M1918 anti-aircraft gun trailer, 1 1/2-ton
- G-12
  - M1917 tank, Renault FT
  - w/ 37 mm gun turret
  - w/ B.T.M. gun turret
  - w/ radio turret (SCR-78)
- G-13
  - MK-VIII tank
- G-14
  - M1 cross country car
- G-15
  - M1 light ordnance tractor, Caterpillar Inc.
- G-16
  - M1 light shop truck, (machine)
- G-17
  - Trailer, maintenance, heavy ord. M1918
- G-18
  - M1918 small arms repair truck
- G-19
  - Interchangeability for special tools
- G-20
  - Truck, maintenance, heavy ord. M1918 (3-ton FWD chassis)
  - Air compressor
  - Office and headquarters
  - Power saw
  - Shop equipment and spare parts
  - Tool room

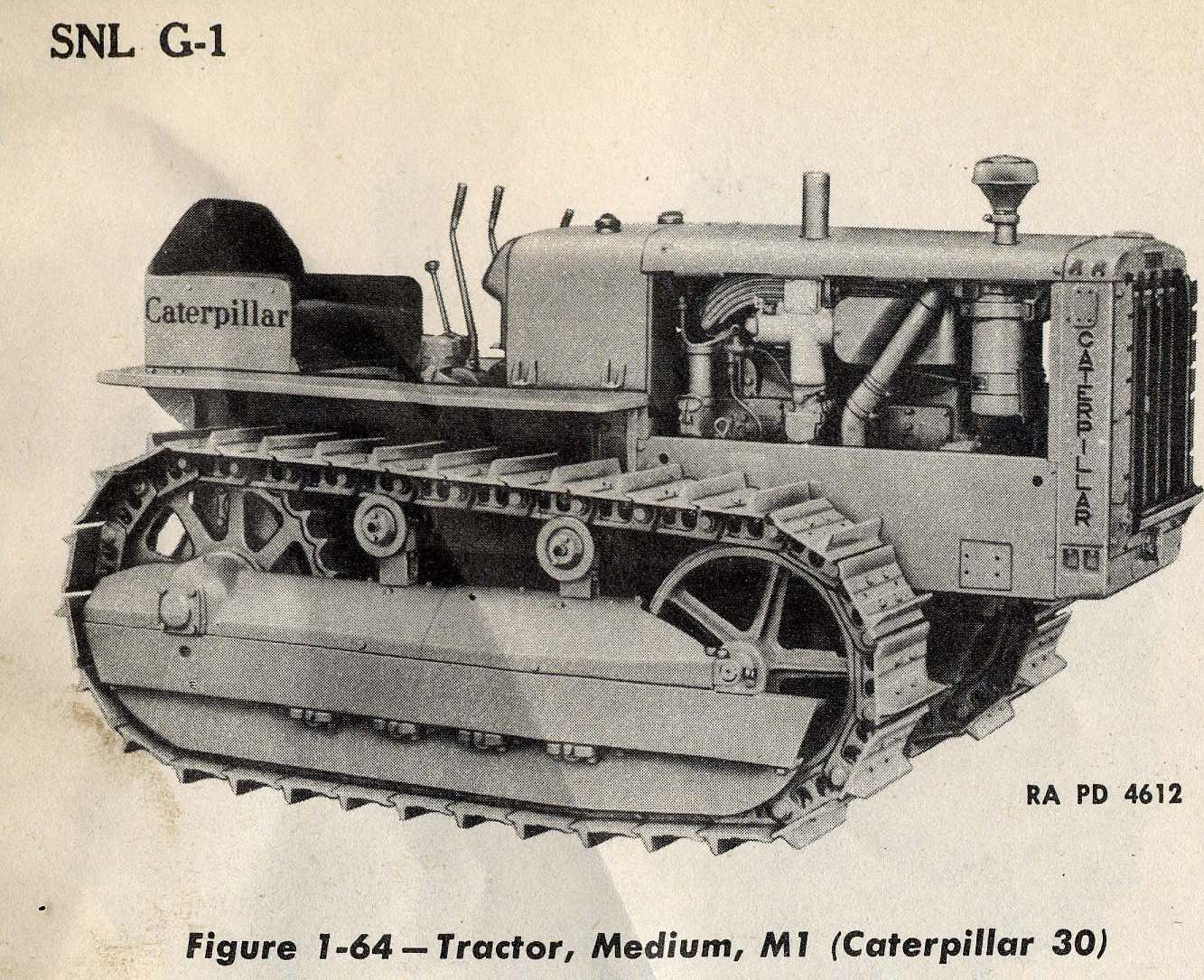
G-21 M1 medium tractor Caterpillar model 30

- G-21
  - M1 medium tractor, Caterpillar Inc., model 30
- G-22
  - M1 heavy, ordnance tractor, Caterpillar Inc., model 60 Caterpillar 60
- G-23
  - M1 rail tractor, 4-ton (FWD truck with rail equipment) in 3 gauges
  - 36-inch for Hawaiian Dept. (narrow gauge)
  - 4' 8 1/2 " for CONUS. (standard gauge)
  - 60-Inch for Dept. of Panama (broad gauge)
- G-24
  - M2 rail tractor, 8-ton (FWD truck with rail equipment) in 3 gauges
  - 36-inch for Hawaiian Dept. (narrow gauge)
  - 4' 8 1/2 " for CONUS. (standard gauge)
  - 60-Inch for Dept. of Panama (broad gauge)
- G-25
  - Rail tractor, w/ track-laying adapters, Fordson

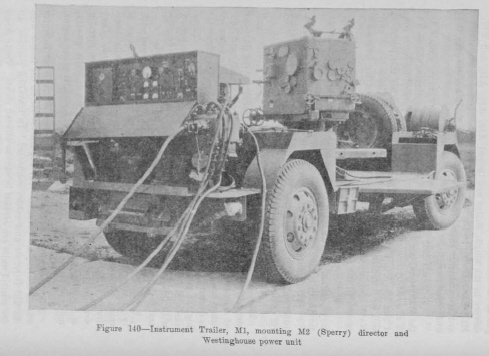
M1 Instrument trailer used with 3-inch antiaircraft gun

- G-26
  - M1 instrument trailer, 6-ton
- G-27

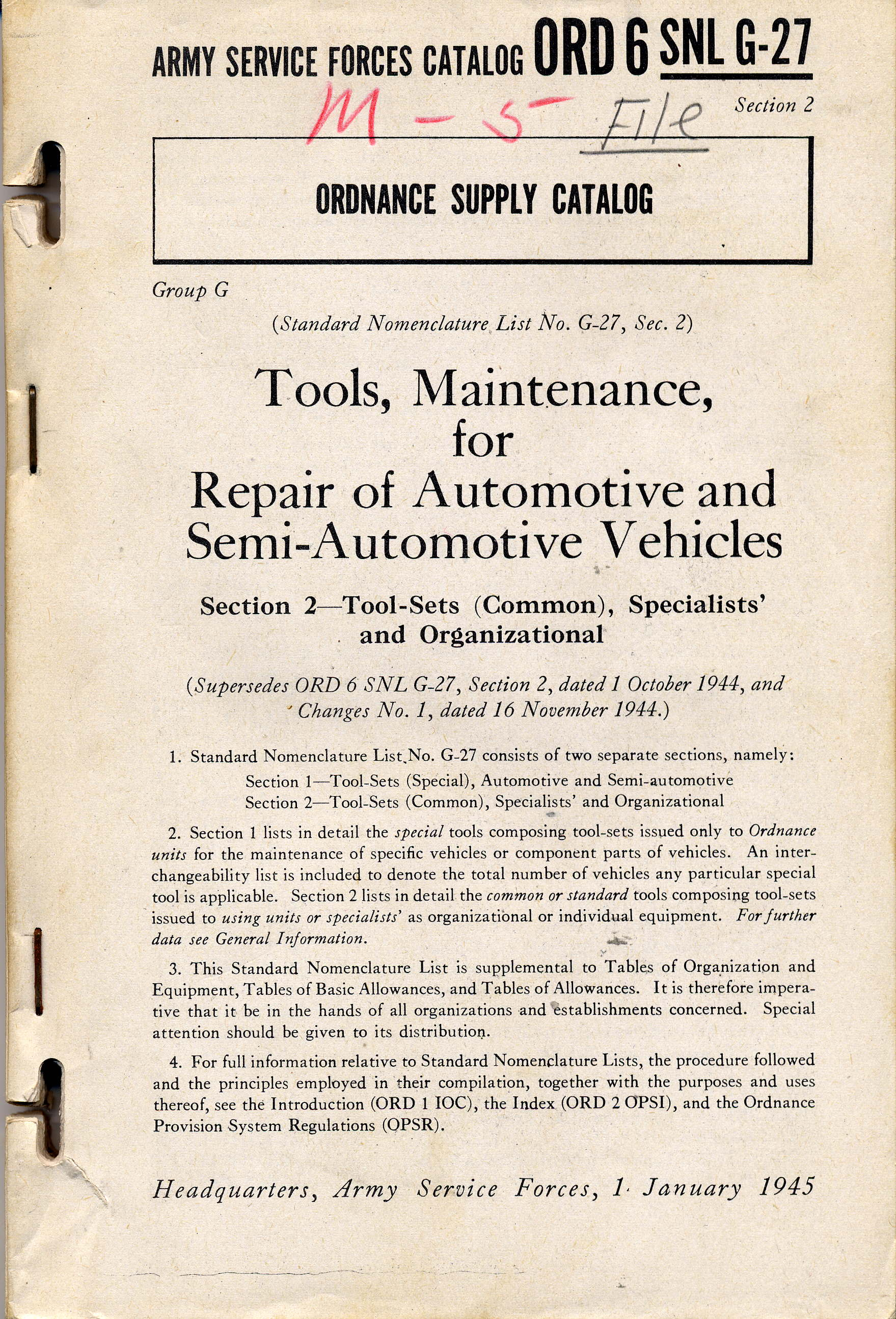
Cover of SNL G-27, section 2 – typical of updatable, loose-leaf manuals, numbered by section or chapter, kept in a dedicated binder.

- Tools, maintenance, for repair of group G materiel.
  - S1. Tool sets (special), automotive and semi automotive. (superseded by ORD 6, SNL J-16)(per 1955 index)
  - S2. Tool sets (common), specialists and organizational. (superseded by group J SNLs)(per 1955 index)

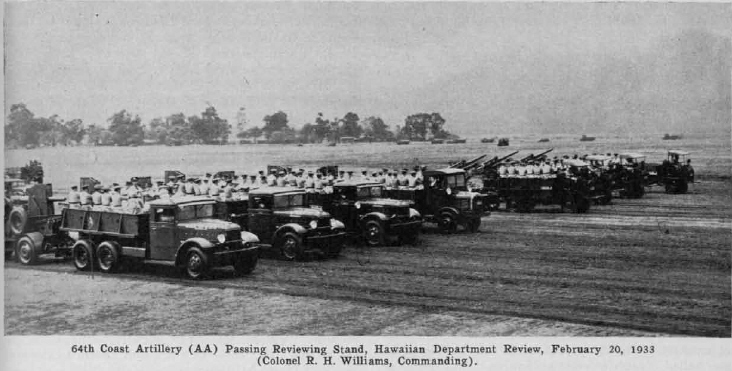
1931 GMC model T95 8-ton trucks towing 3-inch AA guns

- G-28
  - M1 prime mover, 8-ton, anti-aircraft gun (T4) (Corbitt), (1931 GMC model T95 ?)
- G-29
  - M1 armored car, (Cunningham) T4
- G-30
  - T1E1 halftrack, 4 1/2-ton, (1933)
- G-31
  - M1 scout car, T7, White Motor Company
- G-32
  - M2 scout car, T9, Corbitt Company. Armored body by Diebold Safe & Lock Co.
- G-33
  - T4 halftrack, 5-ton, wire laying, GMC, (1934)
- G-34
  - T5 halftrack, 6-ton, GMC/ Cunningham
- G-35
  - T11 armored car, 4-ton, 4×4,
  - T11E1
  - T11E2

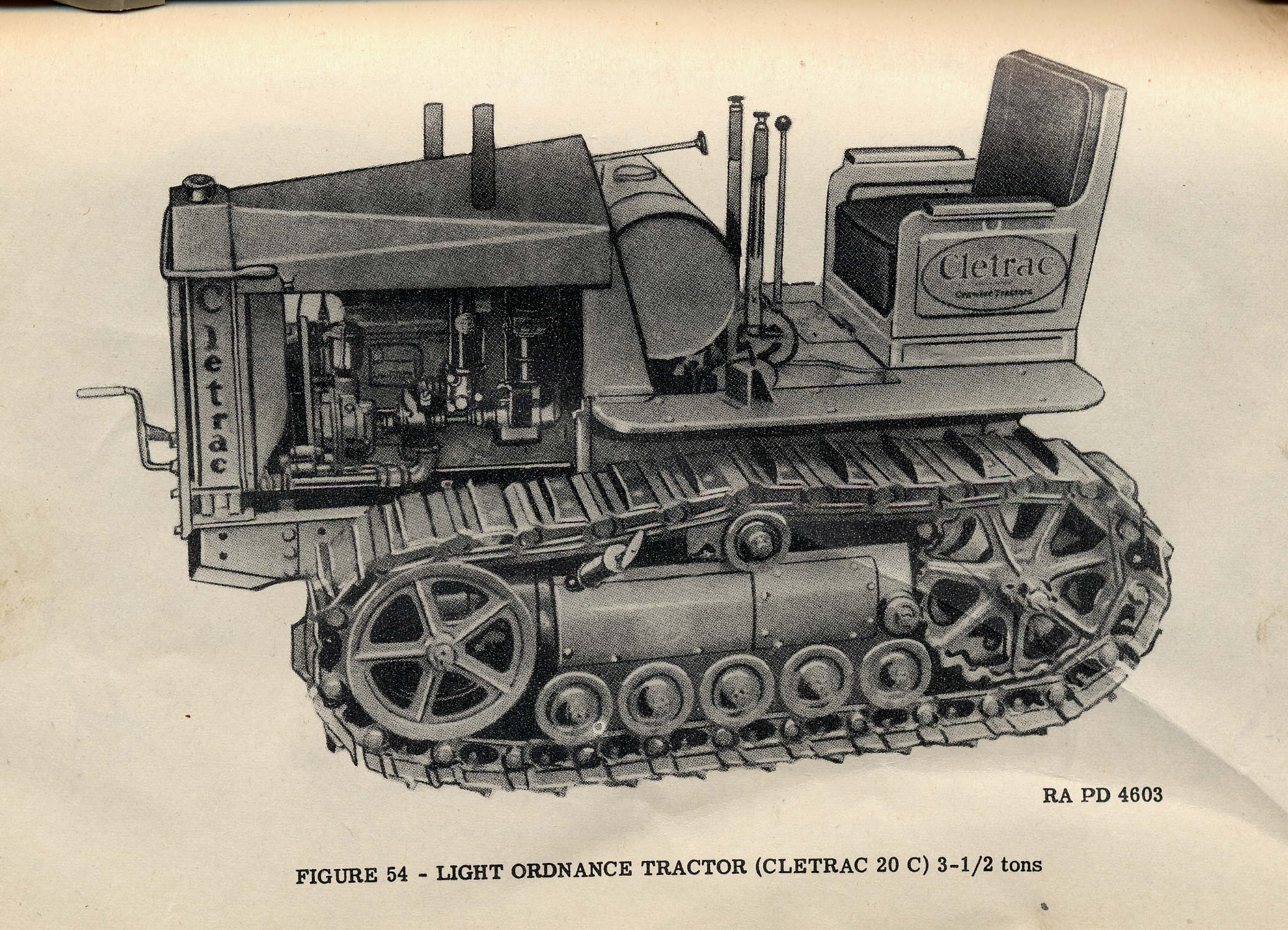
G-36 light tractor Cletrac model 20C

- G-36
  - light tractor, 3 1/2-ton, Cletrac, model 20C
- G-37
  - T3 halftrack, 20 1/2-ton, Linn Mfg. Co.
- G-38
  - M2 light tank
  - M2A1
  - M2A2
  - M2A3
  - Combat car, M1, M1A1
- G-39
  - M2A2 light tank,
- G-40
  - T3 medium tank, 12-tons, U.S. Convertible Systems Inc.
- G-41
  - T3E2 medium tank, 16-tons, U.S. Convertible Systems Inc.
- G-42
  - T4 medium tank, 12-tons, U.S. Convertible Systems Inc.
- G-43
  - T1 Combat car, 12-tons, U.S. Convertible Systems Inc.
- G-45
  - T3E3 light tractor, 3 1/2-ton
  - T4E4
- G-46
  - Ordnance tractor, 3 1/2-ton, Caterpillar Inc., model 25

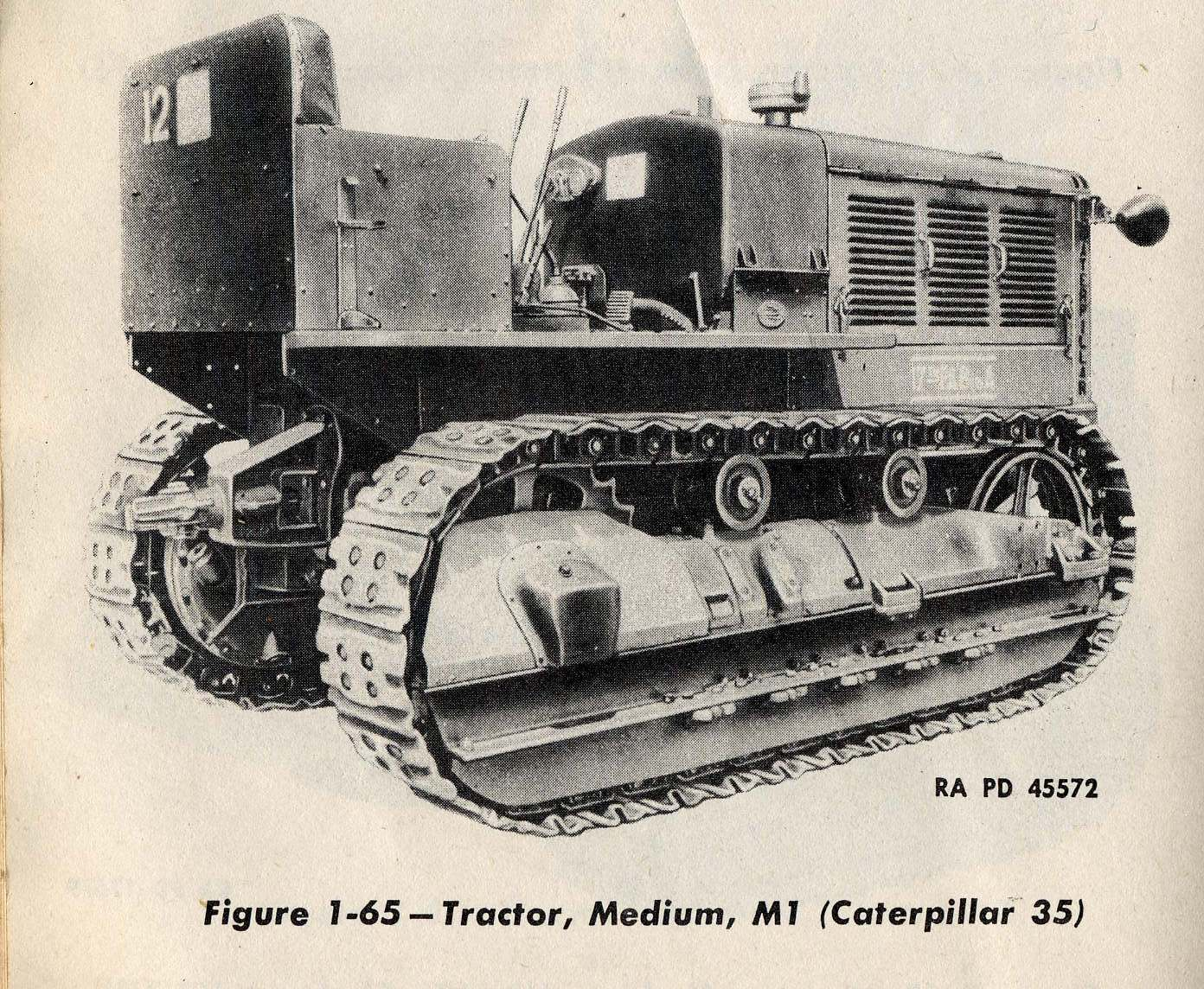
G-47 M1 medium tractor Caterpillar model 35

- G-47
  - M1 medium tractor, Caterpillar Inc., model 35
- G-48
  - M1 medium tractor, Allis-Chalmers Monarch k35

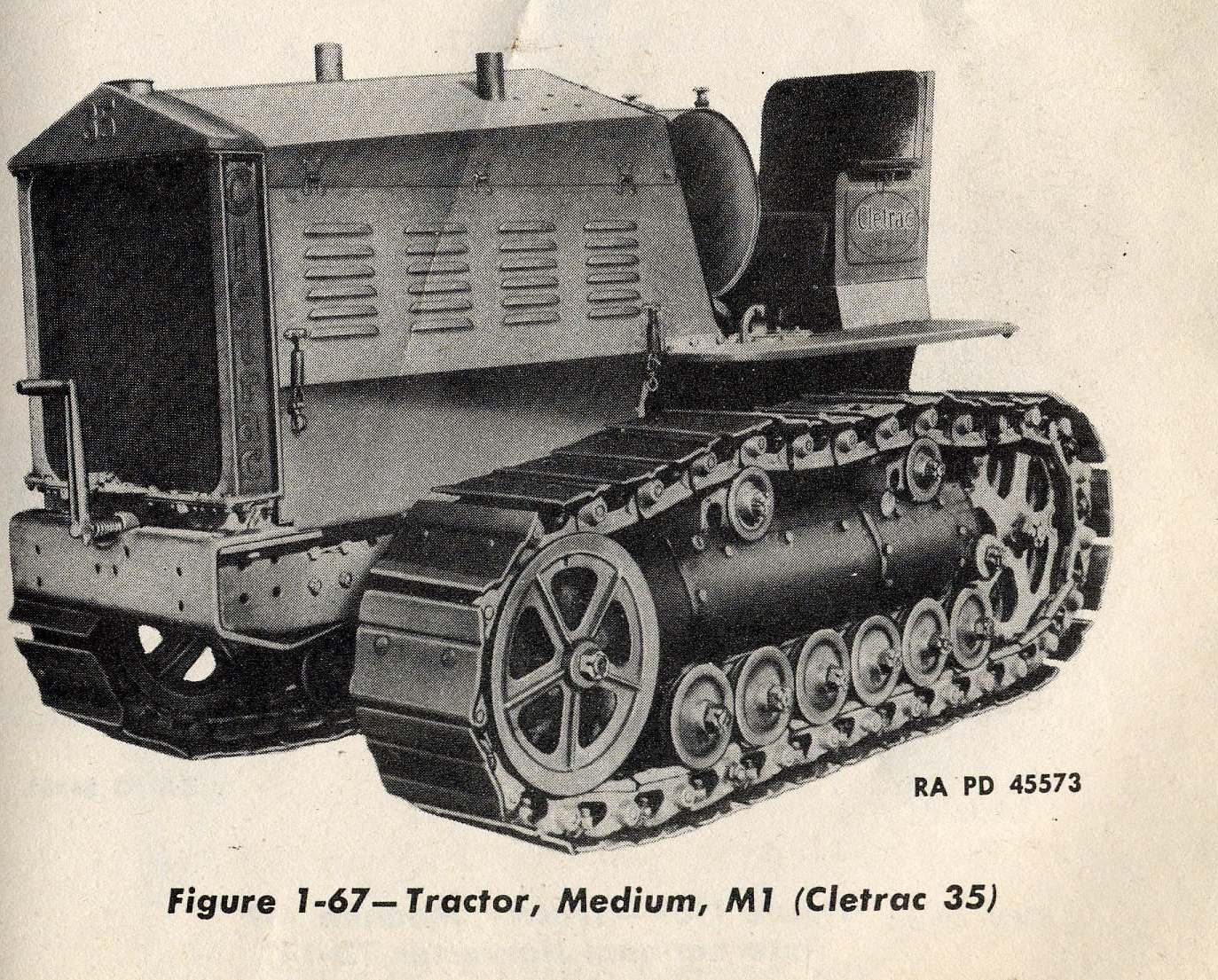
G-49 M1 medium tractor Cletrac model 35

- G-49
  - M1 medium tractor, Cletrac model 35
- G-50
  - Ordnance tractor, 5-ton, International Harvester, model TA40
- G-51
  - Ordnance tractor, Allis-Chalmers Monarch k35
- G-52
  - Ordnance tractor, 10-ton, Caterpillar Inc., model 65
- G-53
  - M1 heavy tractor, Allis-Chalmers
- G-54
  - Ordnance tractor, Cletrac model 80
- G-55
  - M1 Ordnance tractor, 3-ton, Allis-Chalmers
- G-56
  - T20 Ordnance tractor, International Harvester
- G-57

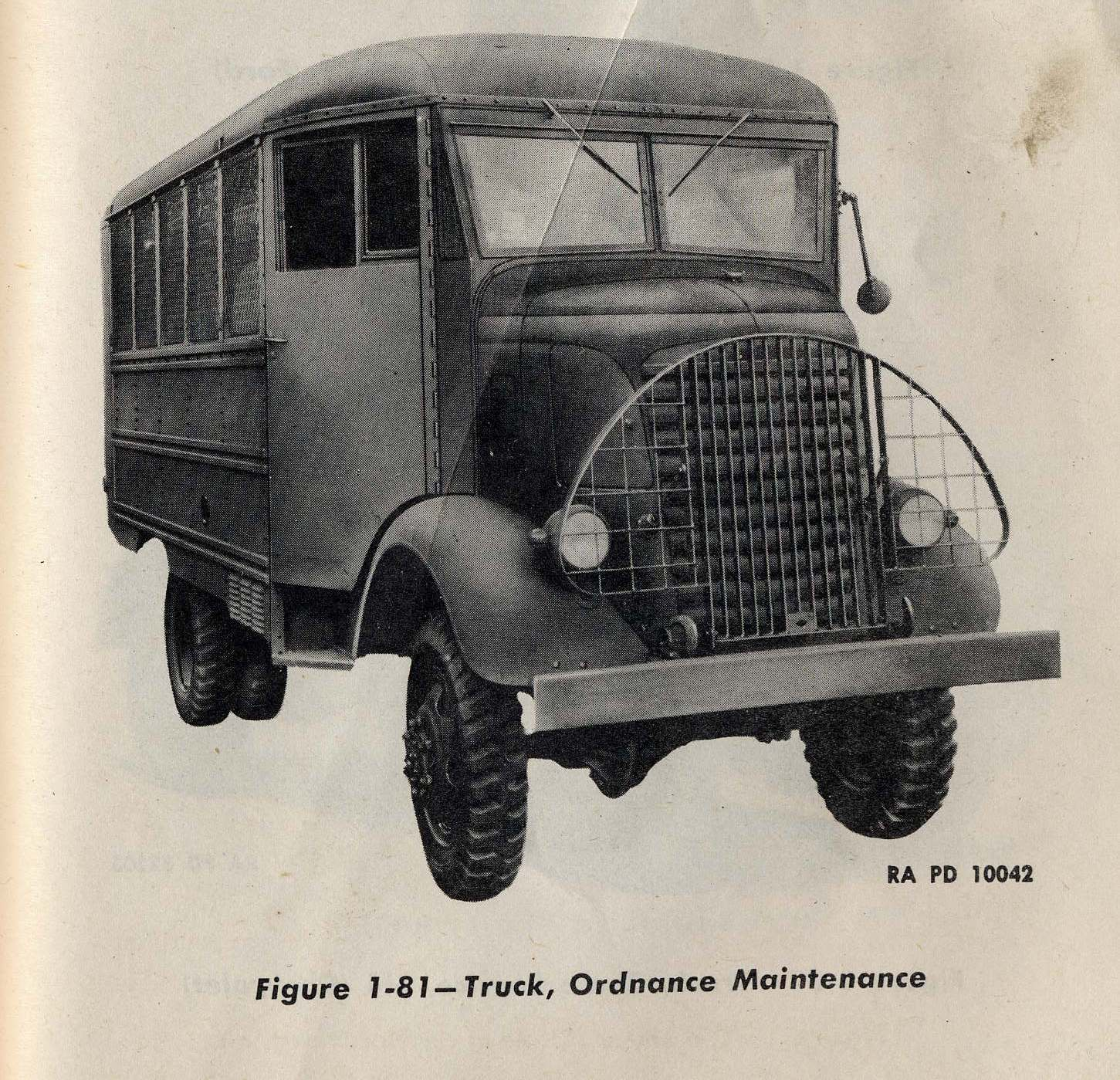
GMC AFKX-352 1 1/2-3-ton shop vans

  - truck, 1 1/2-3-ton, ordnance maintenance, General Motors
  - M3 machine shop
  - M4 machine shop
- G-58
  - truck, 1 1/2-3-ton, ordnance maintenance, General Motors
  - M2 tool and bench
- G-59
  - truck, 1 1/2-3-ton, ordnance maintenance, General Motors
  - M2 welding
  - M3 welding
- G-60
  - T2 squad car White armored car
- G-61
  - Truck, emergency repair, M1 (1/2-ton, 4×4, Telephone Company body), Dodge WC-41
  - Truck, emergency repair, M2 (3/4-ton, 4×4), Dodge WC-60
- G-62
  - Truck, heavy machine shop
- G-63
  - M1 heavy wrecker truck, Corbitt
- G-64
  - M1 tractor crane, 1-ton, Allis-Chalmers model M
- G-65
  - B1A bomb trailer,

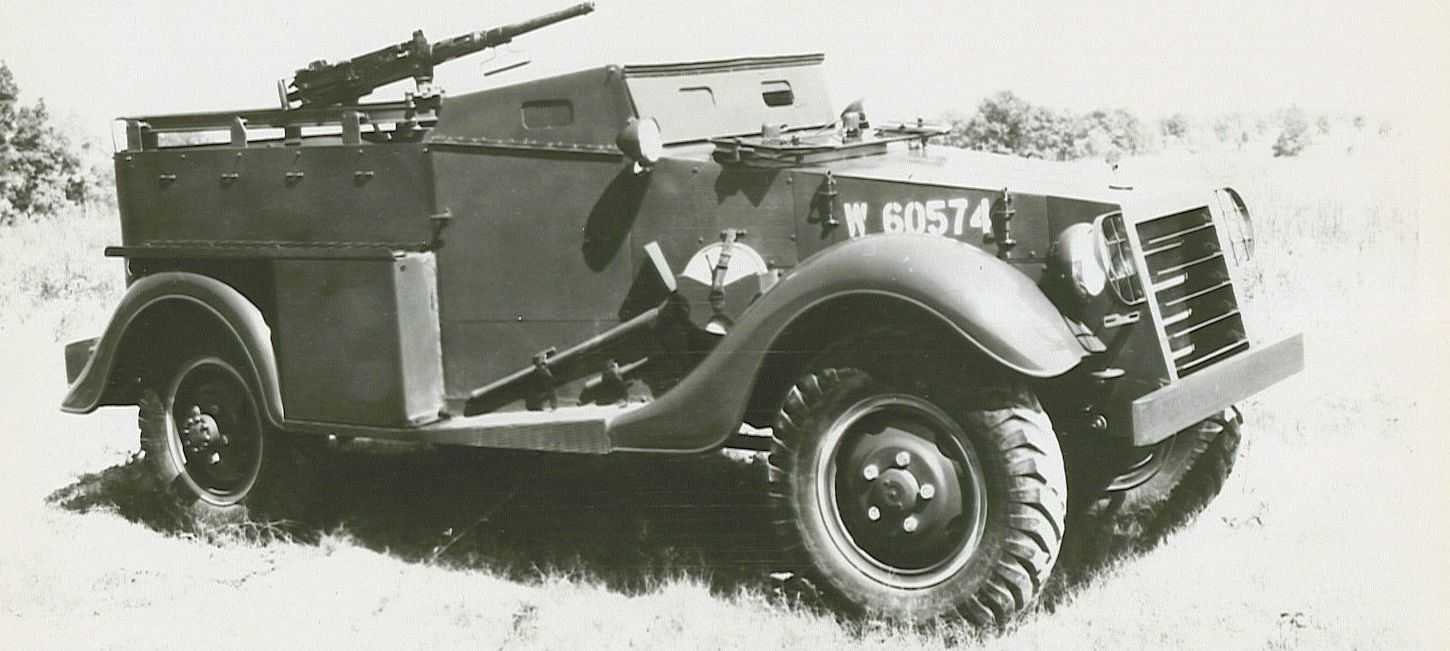
T13 scout car

- G-66
  - M4 scout car
- G-67
  - M3 scout car, M3A1

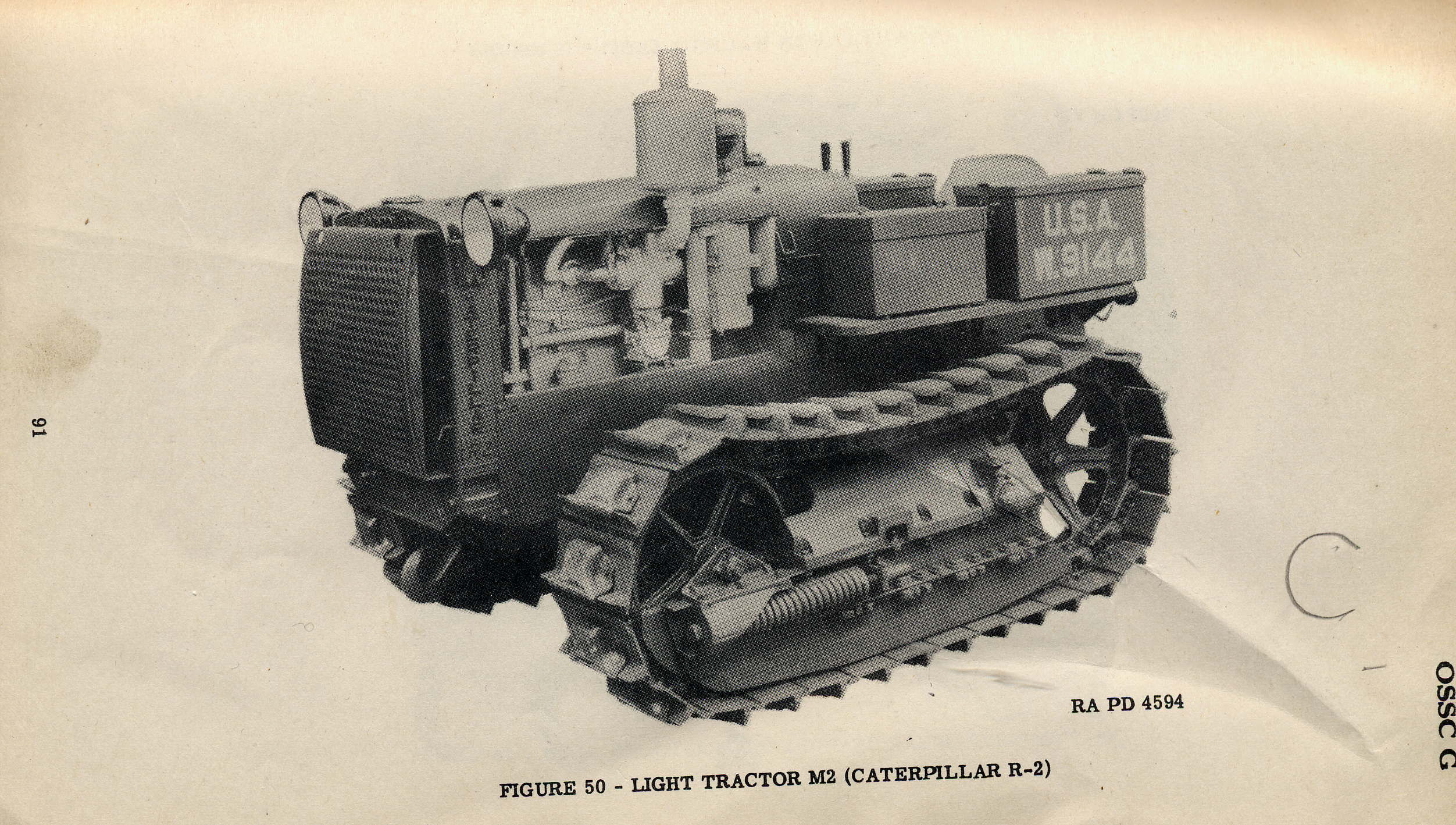
G-68 M2 light tractor Cat model R-2

- G-68
  - M2 light tractor, Caterpillar Inc., model R-2

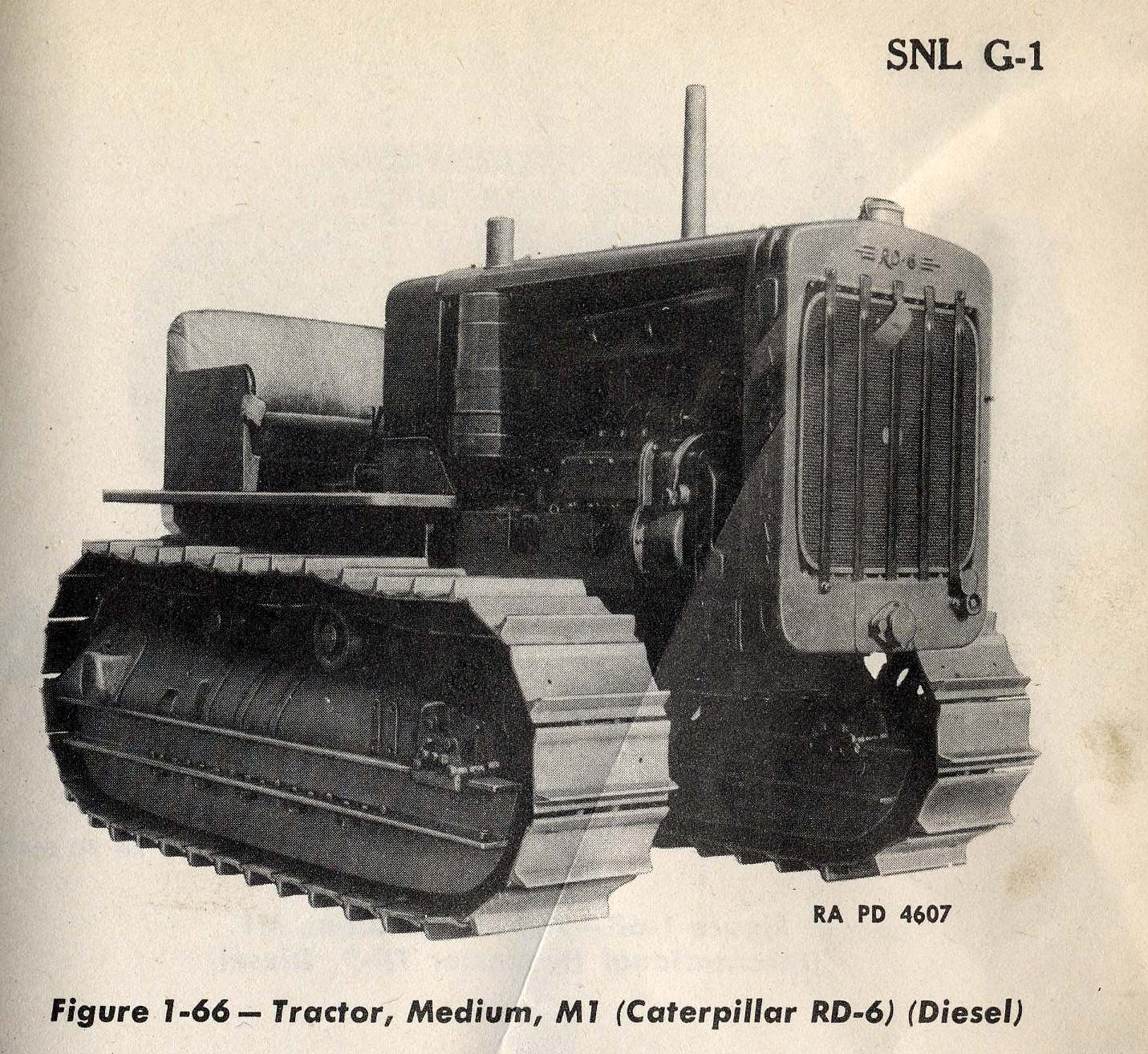
G-69 M1 medium tractor Cat model RD-6

- G-69
  - M1 medium tractor, Caterpillar Inc. model RD-6 Caterpillar D6
  - M3 tractor crane, 2-ton, Caterpillar Inc. model D-6
- G-70
  - Tractor, Marmon-Herrington model TA-30
- G-71
  - T6 light wheeled tractor
- G-72
  - truck, 1 1/2-3-ton, ordnance maintenance, General Motors
  - Truck, small arms repair, M1
- G-73
  - T2 medium wrecking truck
- G-74
  - M5 bomb trailer low bed
  - M1 chemical trailer, with trolly beam
  - M2 chemical trailer
- G-75
  - T7 halftrack, White Motor (M2A2)
- G-76
  - T1 armored car, command
- G-77
  - T1 tank trainer
- G-78
  - T2 combat car trainer

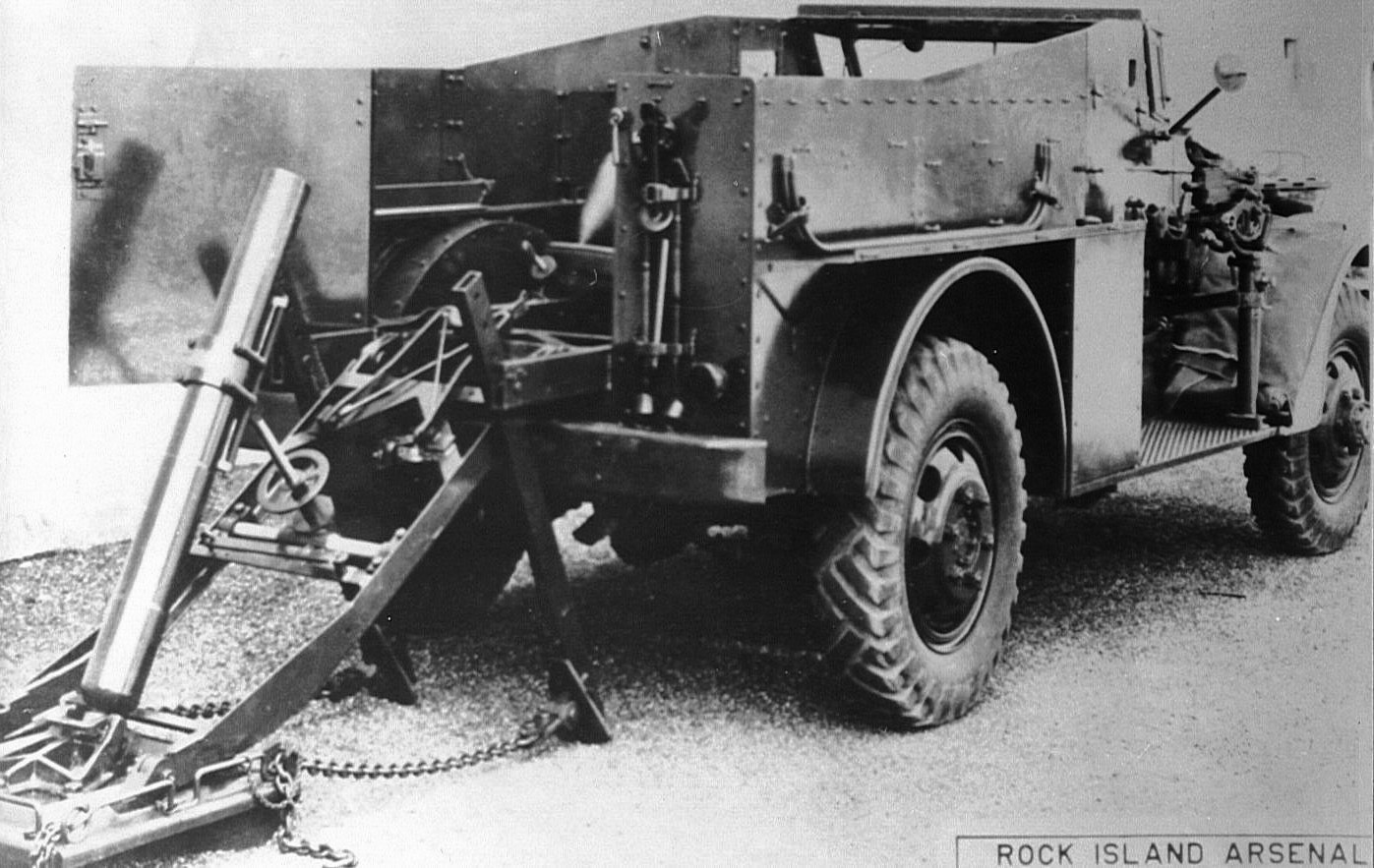
G-79 M2 mortar motor carriage

- G-79
  - M2 mortar motor carriage, (scout car with M1-M2 4.2 inch mortar)
- G-80
  - Carriage motor, mortar T5E1 motor carriage, (Halftrack M2A1 with M1-M2 4.2 inch mortar)
- G-81
  - M2 medium tank, M2A1
- G-82
  - truck, 1 1/2-3-ton, ordnance maintenance, General Motors
  - M1 artillery repair
  - M2 artillery repair
- G-83
  - truck, 1 1/2-3-ton, ordnance maintenance, General Motors
  - M1 automotive repair
  - M2 automotive repair
- G-84
  - truck, 1 1/2-3-ton, ordnance maintenance, General Motors
  - M1 spare parts
  - M2 spare parts

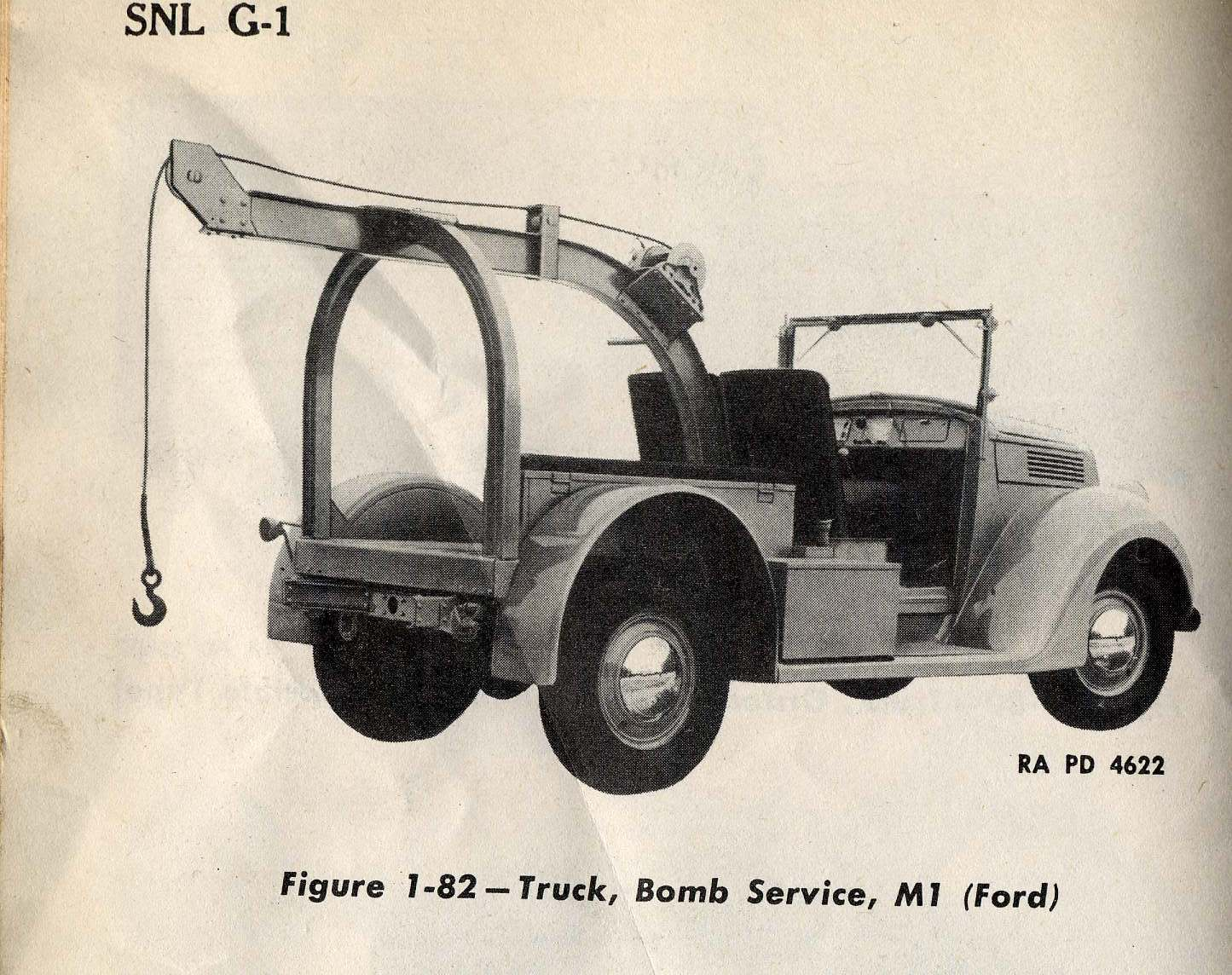
G-85 M1 bomb service truck

- G-85
- Bomb service trucks
  - V1 M1 Yellow Truck & Coach AC-25 (1942)
  - V2 M1 bomb service truck, 19-Y 1 1/2-ton, 4×4, Ford
  - V3 M1 Diamond T, 201 3S
  - V4 M6 bomb service truck, 1 1/2-ton, 4×4, Chevrolet
- G-86
  - M1 light tank
  - M1A1
  - M2A4

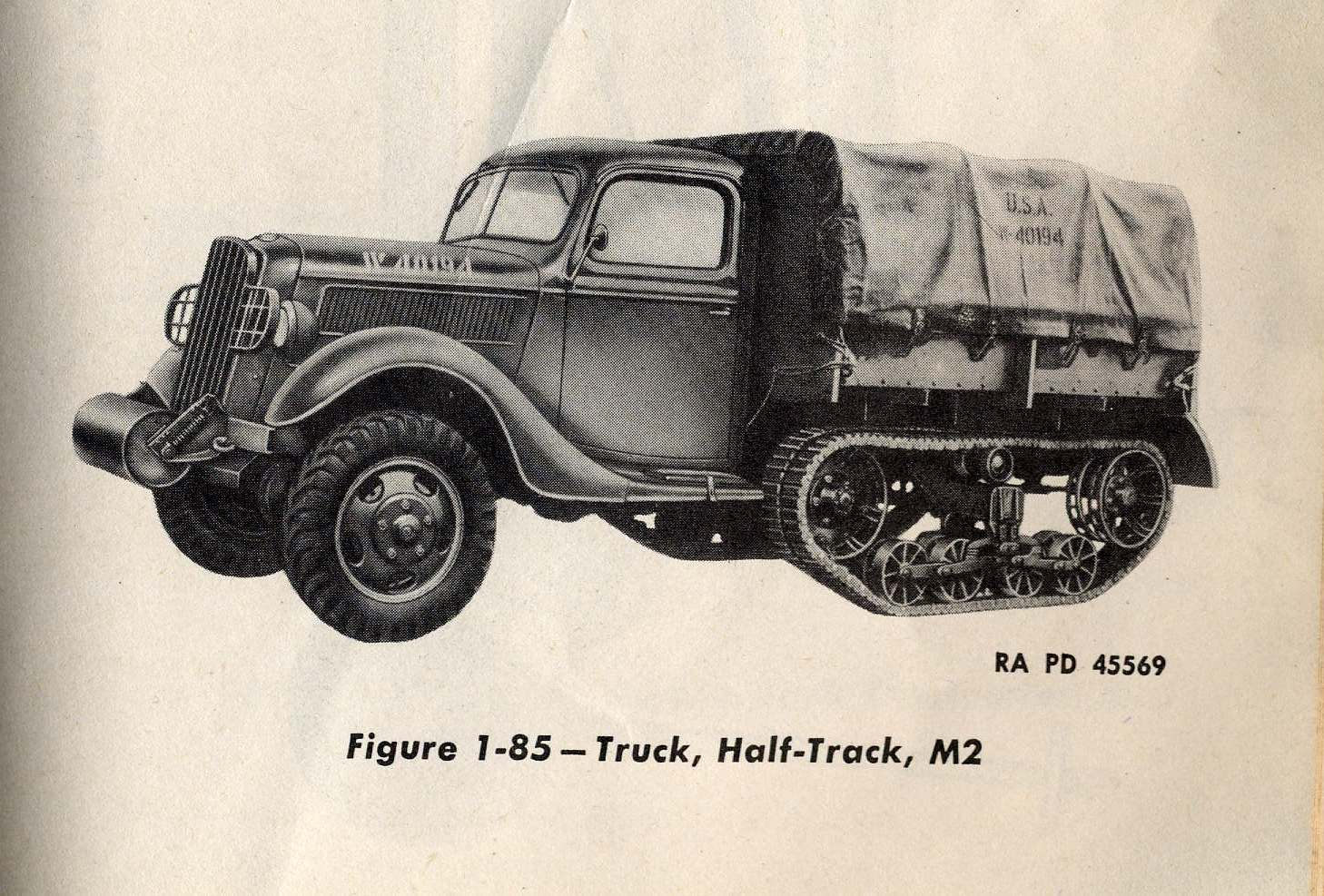
G-87 M2 halftrack truck

- G-87
  - M2 halftrack truck (Ford/Marmon-Herrington, 1937)
- G-88
  - M1 medium ordnance tractor, Caterpillar Inc. R-4 w/angle dozer
- G-89
  - M1 heavy tractor, Caterpillar Inc. RD-7 Diesel, Caterpillar D7
- G-90
  - M4 plotting room trailer
- G-91
  - truck, 1 1/2-3-ton, ordnance maintenance, General Motors
  - M1 tank maintenance
- G-92
  - truck, 1 1/2-3-ton, ordnance maintenance, General Motors
  - M1 instrument repair
- G-93
  - T23E1 trailer, 1-ton
- G-94
  - M2 tractor, light, wheeled, industrial type Allis-Chalmers Model B
- G-95
  - M1 medium tractor, model BC Cletrac, w/angle dozer

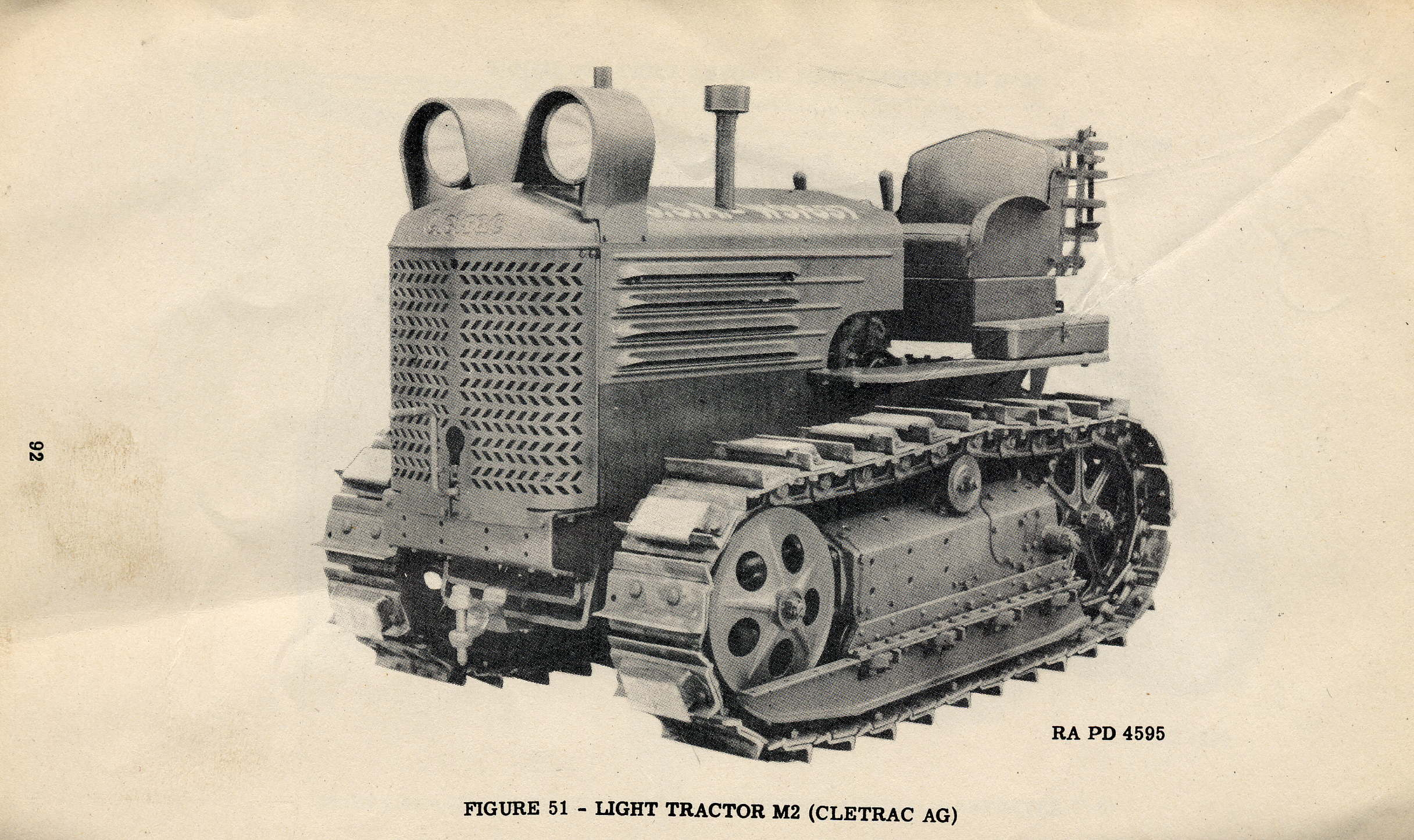
G-96 M2 light tractor Cletrac

- G-96
  - M2 light tractor model AG Cletrac Tractor Co.

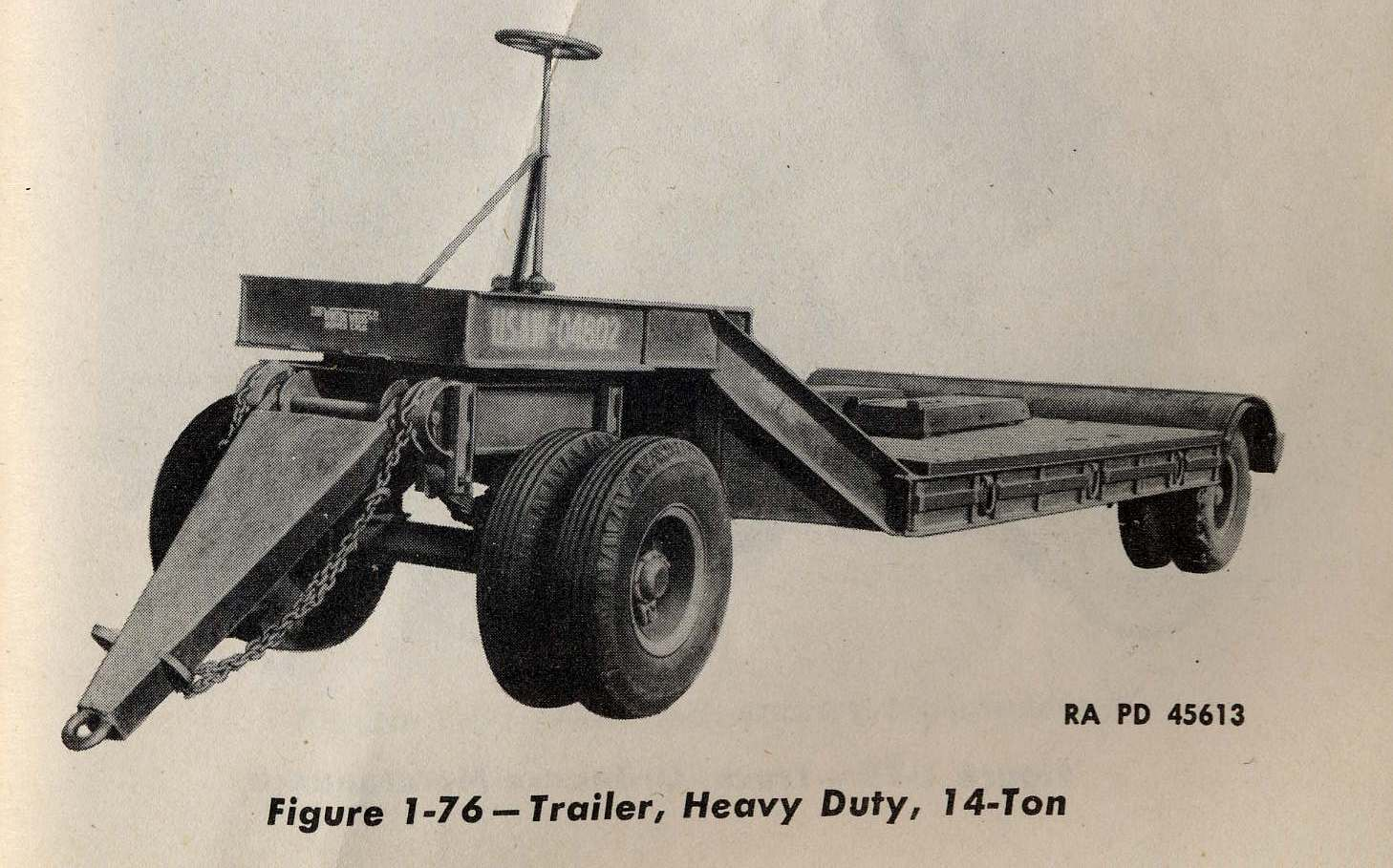
14-ton trailer

- G-97
  - Trailer heavy-duty, 14-ton Winter-Weiss Co.
- G-98
  - M1 heavy tractor, Allis-Chalmers model HD10W

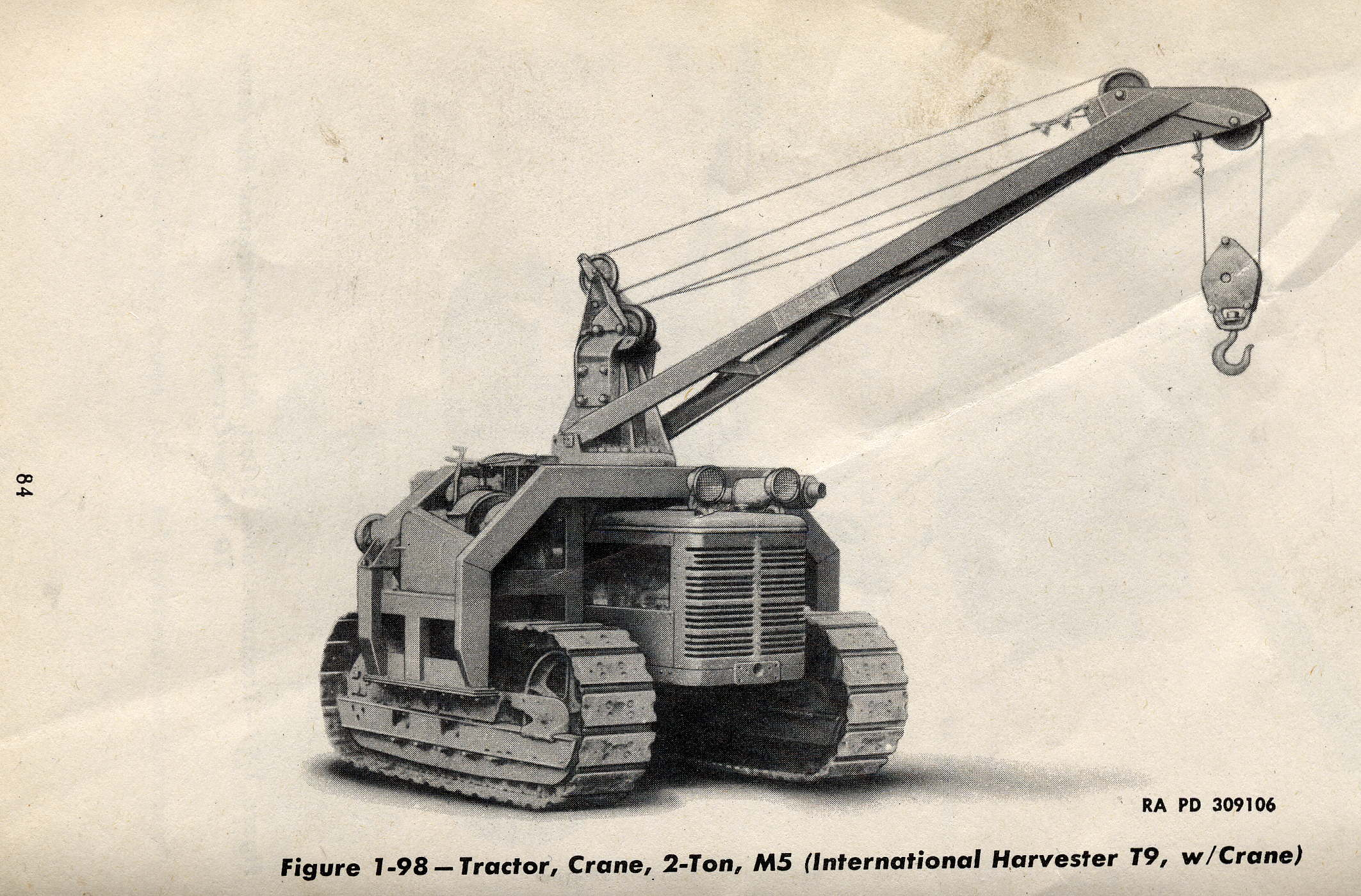
G-99 M5 tractor crane IH

- G-99
  - M5 tractor crane, 2-ton,
  - light tractor IH, TD9

== G-100 to G-199 ==
- G-100
  - T5 cross country carrier,

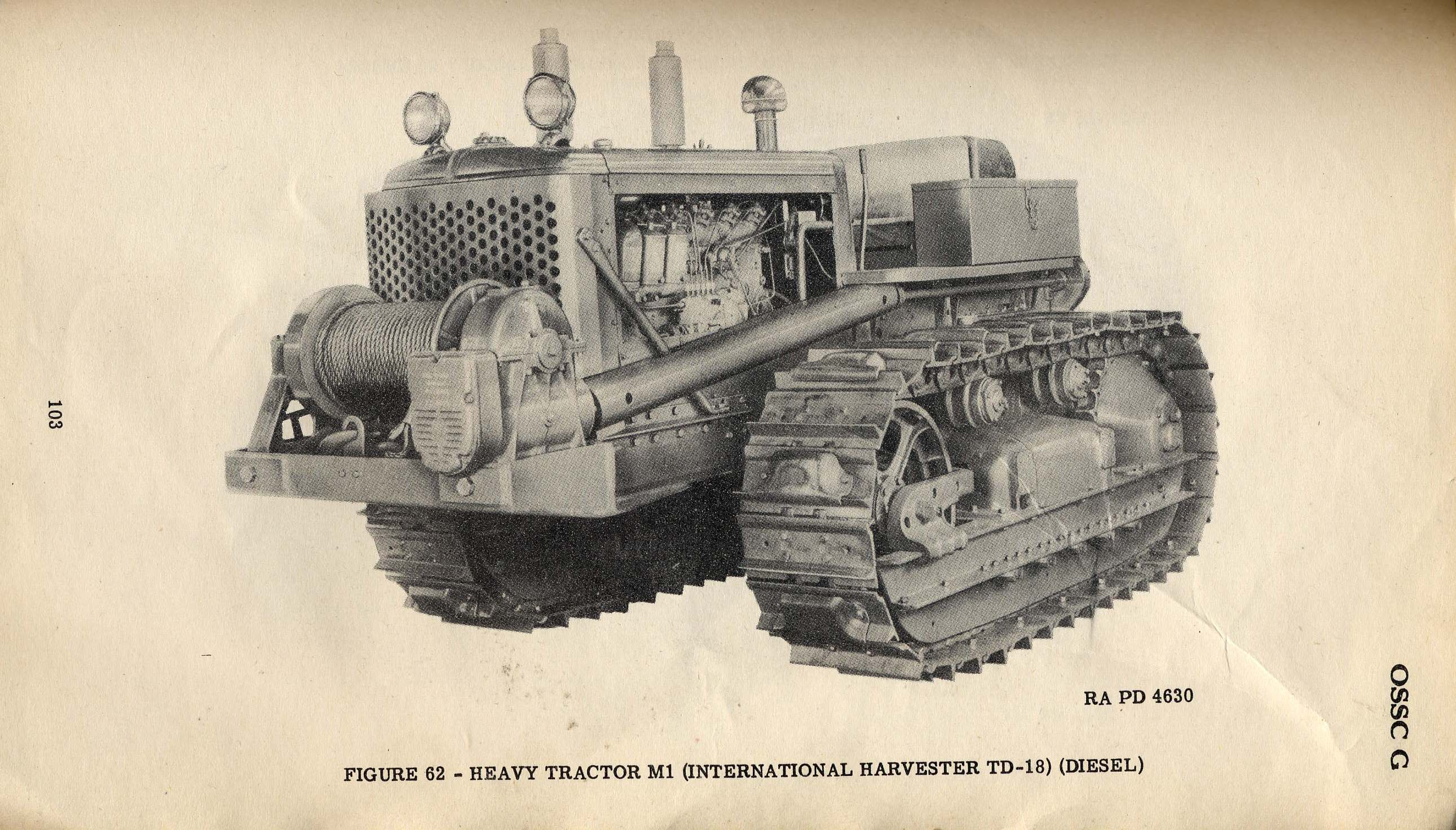
G-101 M1 heavy tractor IH

- G-101
  - M1 heavy tractor, International Harvester model TD18
- G-102
  - Half tracks built by White Motor Co., Autocar, and Diamond T (at least 16 Volumes)
  - Volume 1: Car, half-track, M2 M2 half-track car
  - Volume 2: Car, half-track, M2A1
  - Volume 3: Half-track M3
  - Volume 4: Carrier, personnel, half-track, M3A1
  - Volume 5: Carrier, 81-mm mortar, half-track, M4
  - Volume 6: Carrier, 81-mm mortar, half-track, M4A1
  - Volume 7: Carriage, motor, 57-mm gun, T48
  - Volume 8: Carriage, motor, 75-mm gun, M3
  - Volume 9: Carriage, motor, 75-mm gun, M3A1
  - Volume 10: Carriage, motor, 75-mm howitzer, T30
  - Volume 11: Carriage, motor, 105-mm howitzer, T19
  - Volume 12: Carriage, motor, multiple gun, M13 (T1E4)
  - Volume 13: Carriage, motor, multiple gun, M15 (T28E1).
  - Volume 14: Half-track M16, carriage, motor, multiple gun (quadmount)
  - Volume 15: Half-track M21 carrier 81-mm mortar
  - Volume 16: Half-track M15A1 carriage motor gun
- G-103
  - Stuart light tank
  - Volume 1: M3
  - Volume 2: M5
  - Volume 3: M5A1
- G-104
  - M4 Sherman (Contains 15 volumes)
  - Volume 1: Tank, medium M3
  - Volume 2
  - Volume 3: Tank medium, M3A4
  - Volume 4
  - Volume 5: Tank medium, M3A3
  - Volume 6: Tank medium, M4
  - Volume 7: Tank medium, M4A2 75-mm gun
  - Volume 8: Tank medium, M4A3 75-mm gun (dry)
  - Volume 9: Tank medium, M4A4 75-mm gun
  - Volume 10: Tank medium, M3A5
  - Volume 11: Tank medium, M4A1 75-mm gun
  - Volume 12: Tank medium, M3A1, M3A2
  - Volume 13: Tank medium, M4A6, 75-mm gun
  - Volume 14: Tank medium, M4, 105-mm howitzer
  - Volume 15: Tank medium, M4A3, 105-mm howitzer
- G-105
  - M1 medium tractor, Allis-Chalmers model WM
- G-106
  - M1 medium tractor, International Harvester model T6 w/angle dozer
- G-107
  - M1 heavy tractor, Allis-Chalmers model HD10W

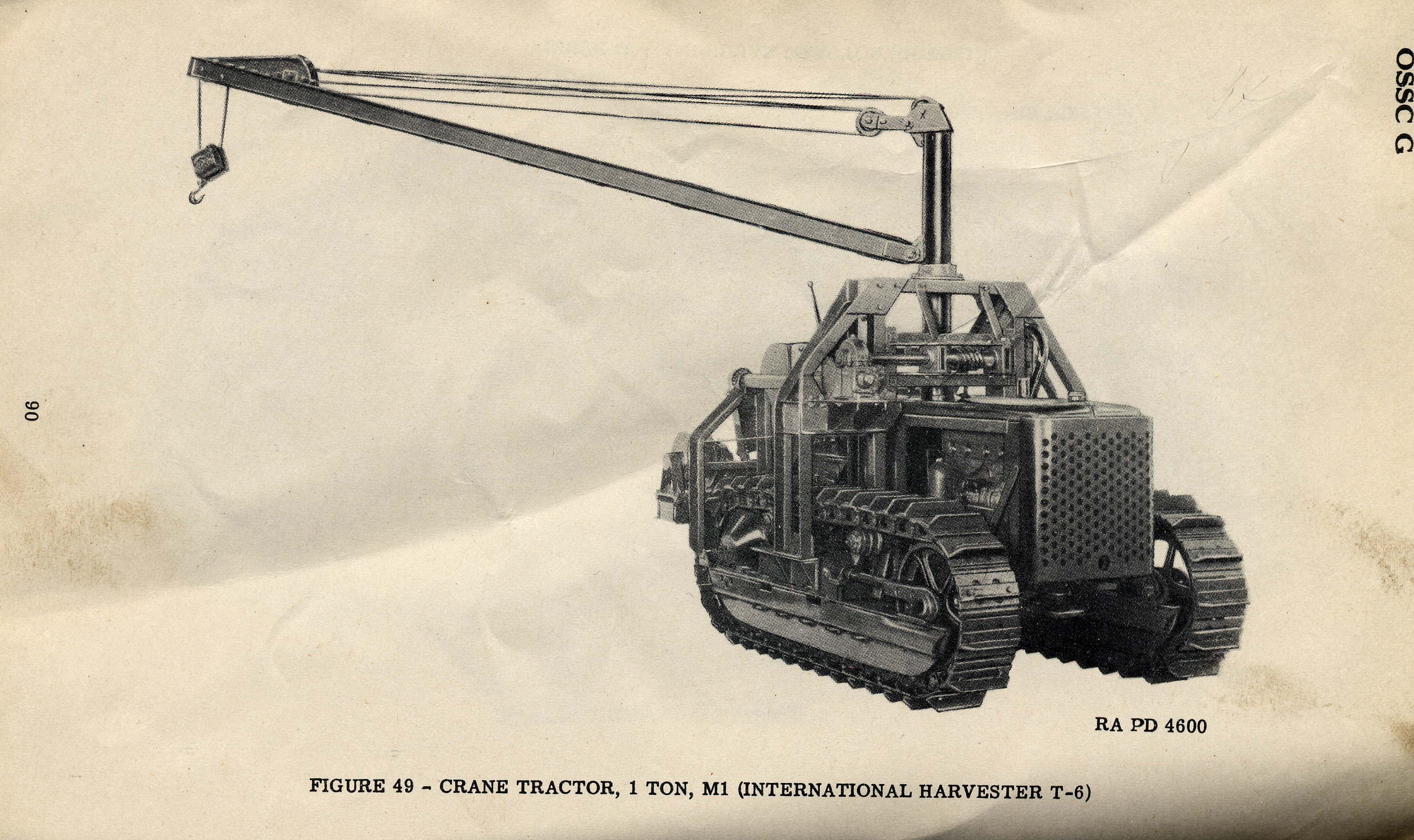
G-108, M1 tractor crane IH

- G-108
  - Tractor crane, 1-ton, International Harvester model T6
- G-109
  - M1 bomb service truck, Ford, model 19F
- G-110
  - M1 bomb service truck, Diamond T model 201-BS
- G-111
  - M2 high-speed tractor, 7-ton, model MG-1 Cletrac Tractor Co.
- G-112
  - M1 emergency repair, Fargo Dodge

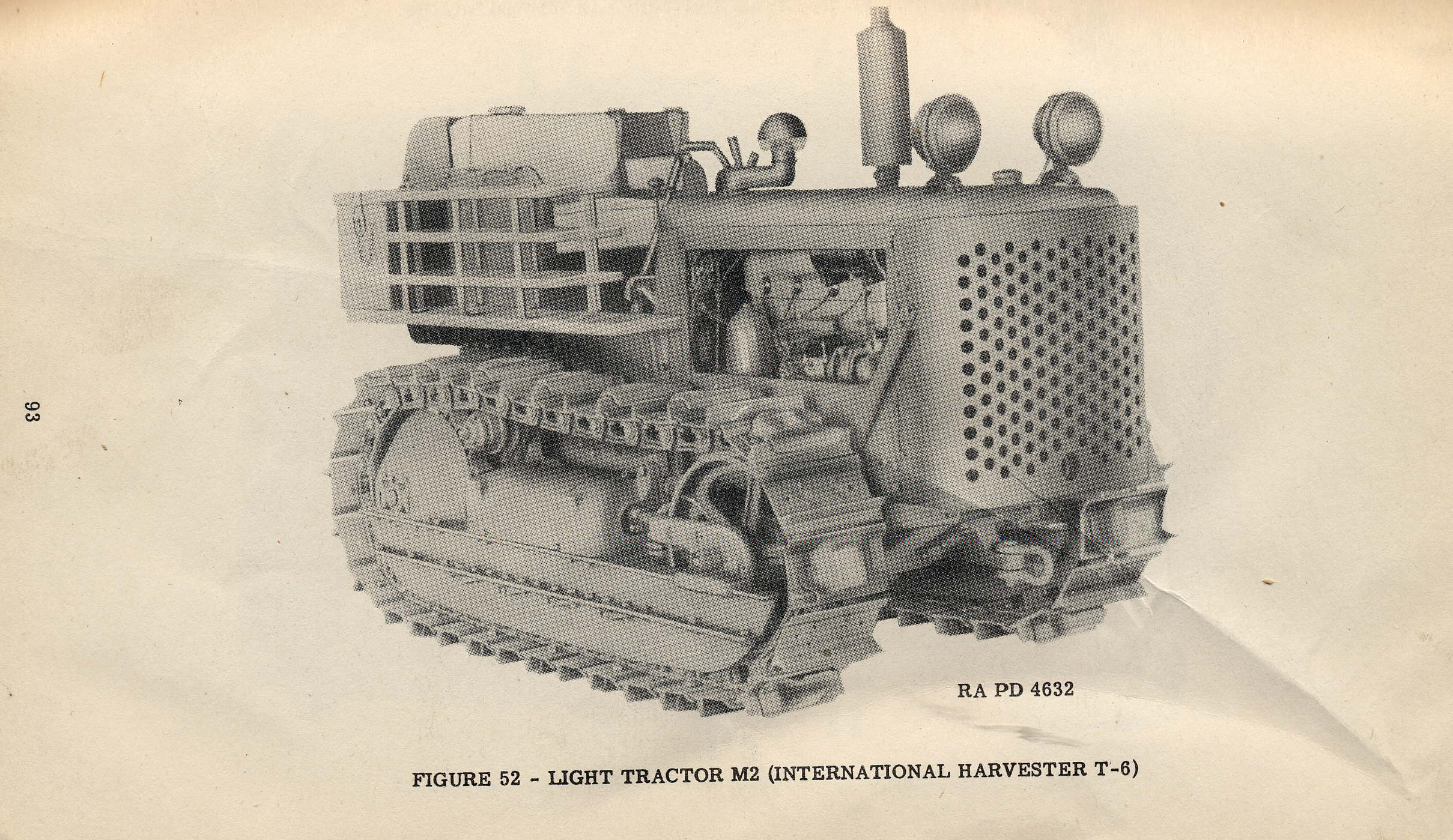
G-113, M2 light tractor IH T-6

- G-113
  - M2 light tractor, International Harvester model T6
- G-115
  - M6 bomb service truck, Chevrolet
- G-116
  - Truck, 10-ton, 6x6, heavy wrecking M1
  - M1 w/closed cab
  - M1A1 w/open cab

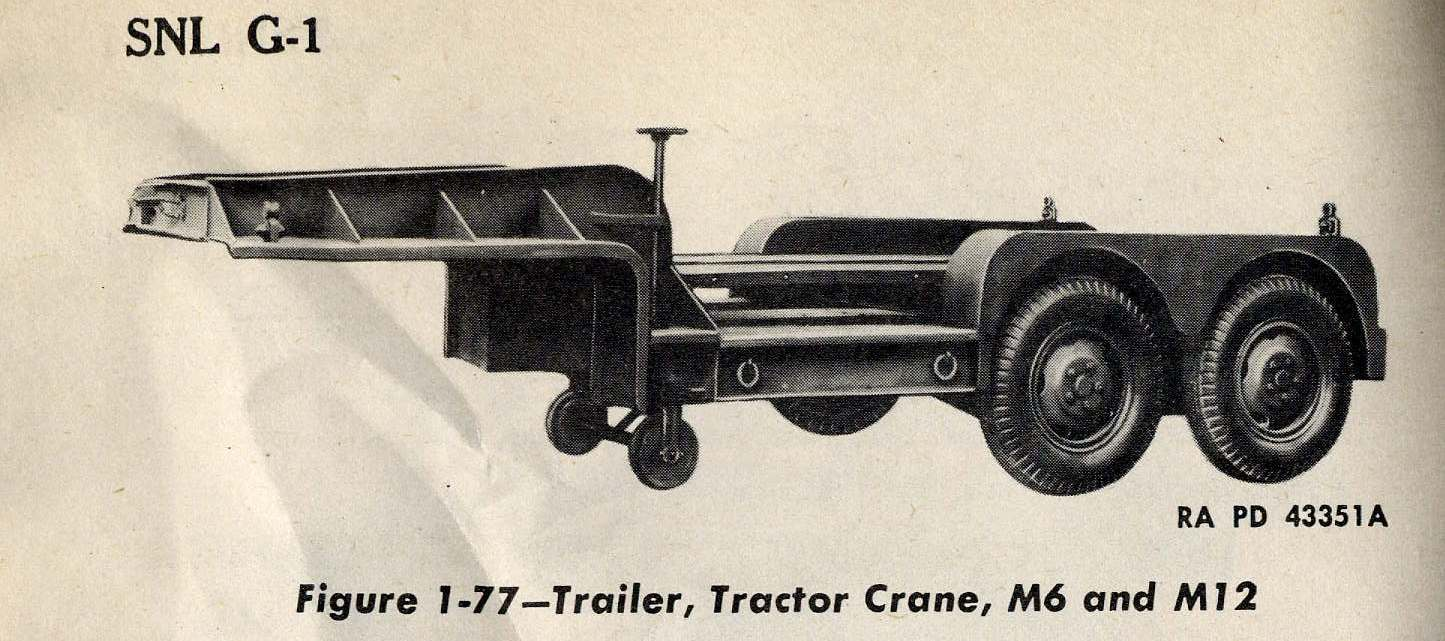
M6/M12 trailer

- G-117
  - M6 trailer, 7-ton, (T26), Fruehauf (for tractor cranes)
  - M12 trailer, 9-ton
- G-118
  - M6 heavy tank
- G-119
  - T23E2 trailer, 6-ton
- G-120
  - M5 gun motor carriage, 3" Gun, Cletrac
- G-121
  - M6 gun motor carriage (Fargo, Dodge WC-55)
- G-122
  - armored car T17E1, 4×4 Chevrolet
- G-123
  - Tracked trailer, built by Athey Truss Wheel CO.
  - 6-ton model BT898-1 general cargo
  - 6-ton model BT898-4 general cargo
  - 20-ton model ET1076-1 general cargo
- G-124
  - light tractor, Caterpillar Inc., model D-2
- G-125
  - M1 medium tractor, Allis-Chalmers

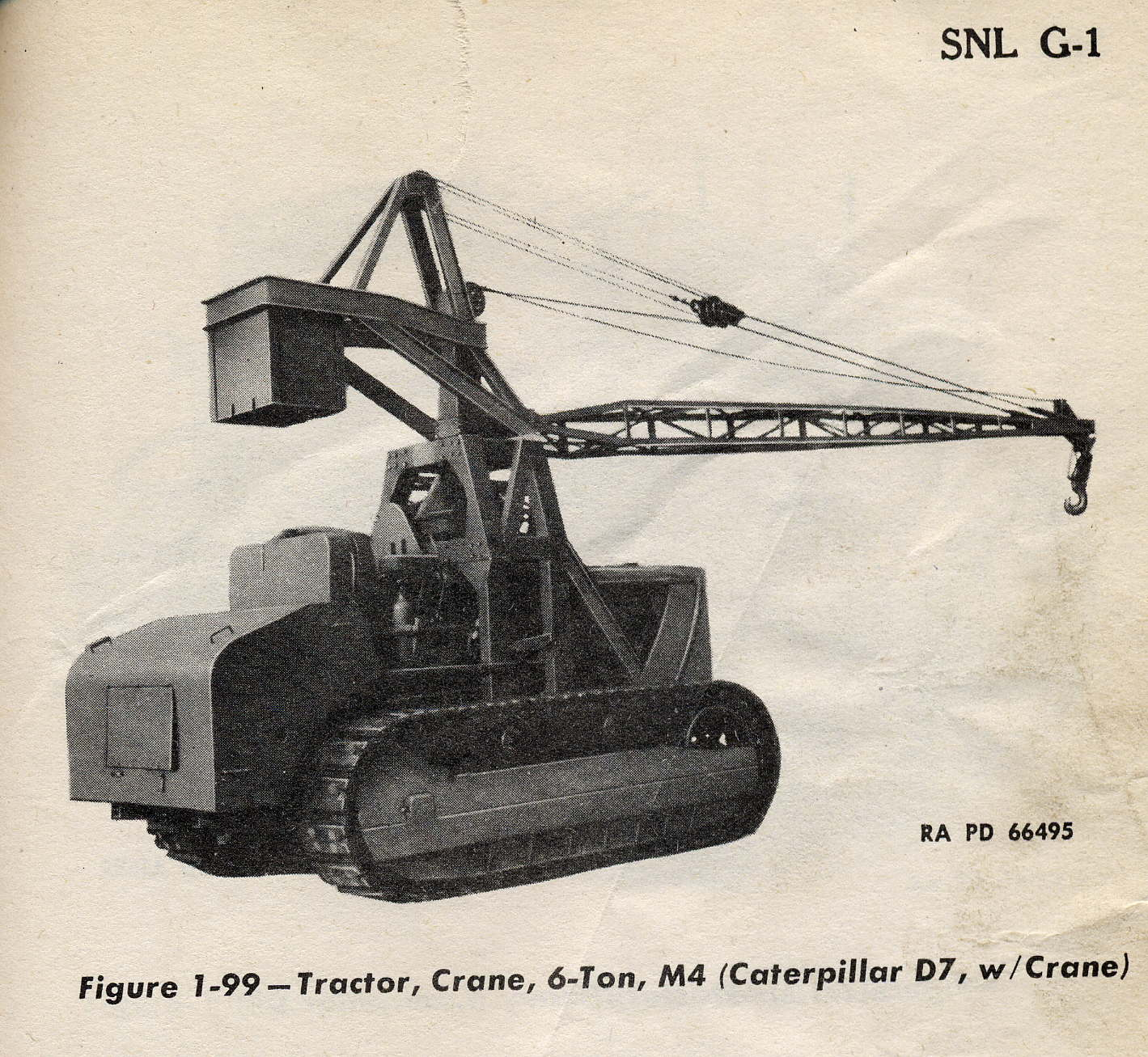
G-126 M4 tractor crane Cat D-7

- G-126
  - M1 heavy tractor Caterpillar Inc. model D-7
  - M4 tractor crane by Cardwell Crane Co.
- G-127
  - Howitzer motor carriage M8, for 75-mm howitzer.
- G-128
  - M7 Priest, gun motor carriage, 105-mm, American Locomotive Company
- G-130
  - M10 tank destroyer, 3" Gun, GMC Fisher tank division

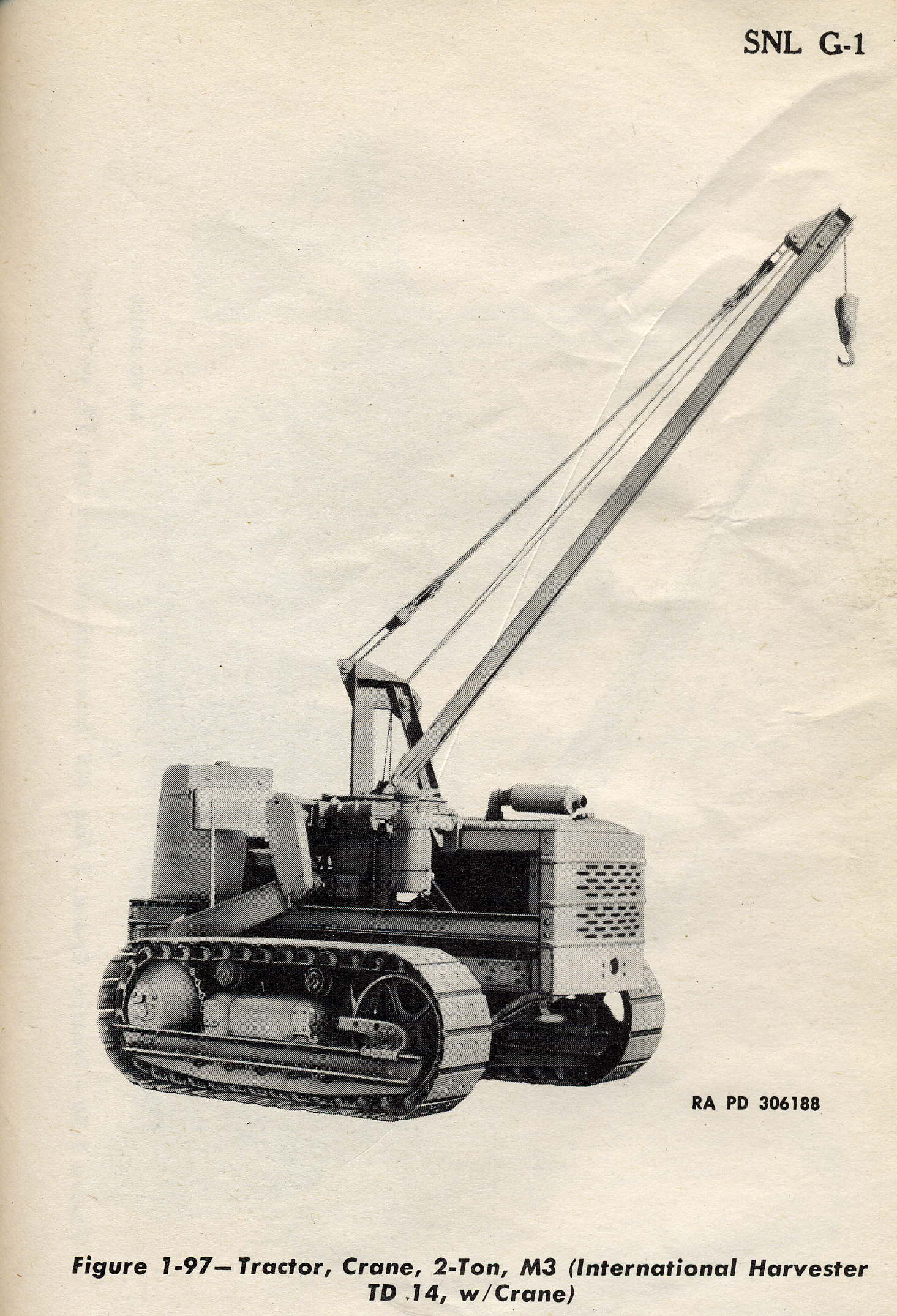
G-132 M3 tractor crane IH

- G-132
  - M1 medium tractor,
  - M3 tractor crane, 2-ton, International Harvester TD14
- G-133
  - T18 Boarhound, Yellow Coach
  - T18E2 armored car,
- G-134
  - T17 Deerhound Ford(M5 Deerhound)
- G-135
  - T13 Armoured car, REO
- G-136
  - M8 Greyhound

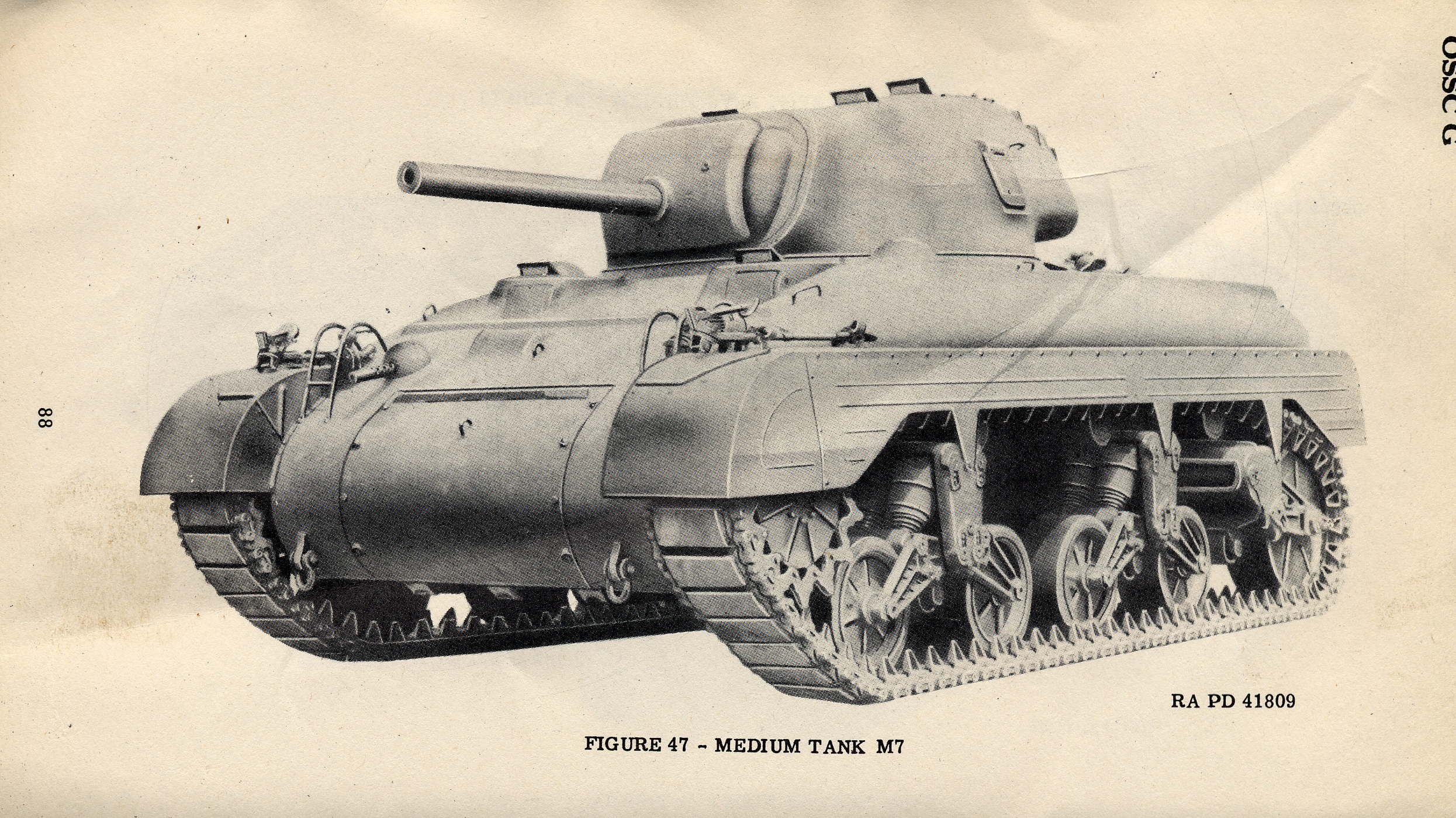
G-137 M7 medium tank IH

- G-137
  - M7 medium tank, International Harvester
- G-138
  - Ordnance maintenance truck, 2 1/2-ton, 6×6, GMC CCKW
  - M7A1 2 1/2-ton, 6 x 6, Small Arms Repair Truck
  - M7A2 2 1/2-ton, 6 x 6, Small Arms Repair Truck
- G-139
  - Ordnance maintenance truck, 2 1/2-ton, 6×6, GMC CCKW
  - M8
  - M8A1 automotive repair truck
- G-140
  - Ordnance maintenance truck, 2 1/2-ton, 6×6, GMC CCKW
  - M9
  - M9A1 artillery repair truck
- G-141
  - Ordnance maintenance truck, 2 1/2-ton, 6×6, GMC CCKW
  - M10
  - M10A1 instrument repair truck
- G-142
  - Ordnance maintenance truck, 2 1/2-ton, 6×6, GMC CCKW
  - M12
  - M12A1 welding truck
- G-143
  - Ordnance maintenance truck, 2 1/2-ton, 6×6, GMC CCKW
  - M13 tool and bench truck
- G-144
  - Ordnance maintenance truck, 2 1/2-ton, 6×6, GMC CCKW
  - M14 spare parts truck
- G-145
  - Ordnance maintenance truck, 2 1/2-ton, 6×6, GMC CCKW
  - M18 electric repair truck
- G-146
  - Ordnance maintenance truck, 2 1/2-ton, 6×6, GMC CCKW
  - M16
  - M16A1 machine shop truck
  - M16A2
- G-147
  - M5 halftrack, variant of M2 half-track car built by International Harvester
  - M5A1
  - M9A1
  - M14 multiple gun motor carriage, twin mount.
  - M17 multiple gun motor carriage, quadmount
- G-148
  - M22 Locust, (T9E1) light tank
- G-149
  - Ordnance maintenance truck, 2 1/2-ton, 6×6, GMC CCKW
  - M18
  - M18A1
  - M18A2 electric repair truck
- G-150
  - M4 tractor high speed, 18-ton Allis-Chalmers
  - M4C
- G-151
  - Light tractor, Caterpillar Inc. model D4, Caterpillar D4
- G-152

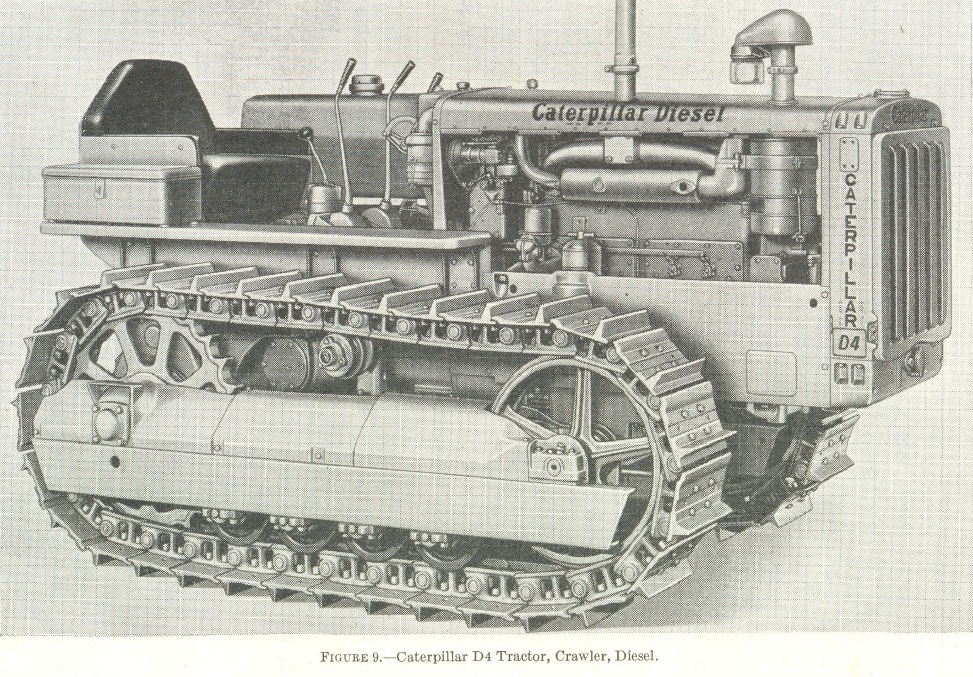
G-151 Caterpillar D4 Tractor, Crawler, Diesel

  - Tractor, medium, Caterpillar Inc. model D6, Caterpillar D6
- G-153
  - Tractor, heavy, Caterpillar Inc. model D8, Caterpillar D8
- G-154
  - M29 Weasel T-15 carrier, light cargo
- G-155
  - M4 plotting room trailer
- G-156
  - Landing Vehicle Tracked MK-I, Food Machinery Corporation
- G-157
  - M8 armored trailer, John Deere plow works

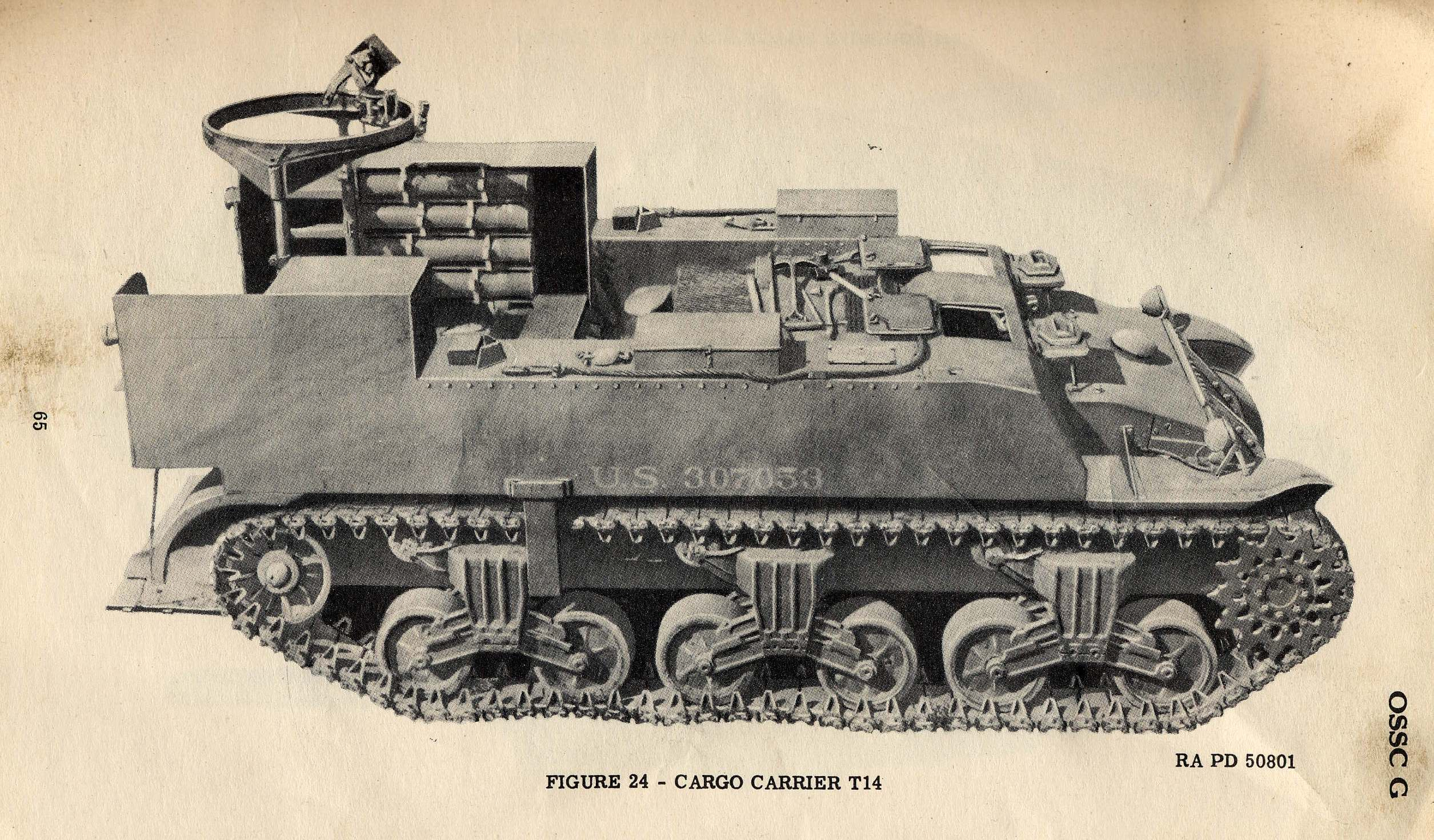
T14/M30 cargo carrier

- G-158
  - M30 cargo carrier, (T14), Pressed Steel Car Co.
  - M12 gun motor carriage
- G-159
  - M19 tank transporter, M20 truck (tractor) and M9 trailer combination, Diamond T tank transporter
- G-160
  - M25 tank transporter, M26 tractor and M15 trailer combination Paccar, Dragon Wagon
- G-161
  - M22 lift truck Weaver Mfg. Co.
- G-162
  - M5 tractor, high speed, International Harvester
  - M5A1
- G-163
  - M18 Hellcat motor carriage, 76-mm gun, (T70)
  - M39 armored utility vehicle, prime mover for 3-inch gun M6
- G-164
  - M10 tank gunnery trainer, 37 mm gun,
- G-165
  - tank infantry, MK-III
- G-166
  - Universal Carrier T-16
- G-167
  - Landing Vehicle Tracked MK-II, Food Machinery Corporation
- G-168
  - Landing Vehicle Tracked MK-III, Food Machinery Corporation
- G-169
  - T2 tank recovery vehicle, Baldwin Locomotive Works
- G-170
  - M10A1 gun motor carriage, M10 tank destroyer Ford

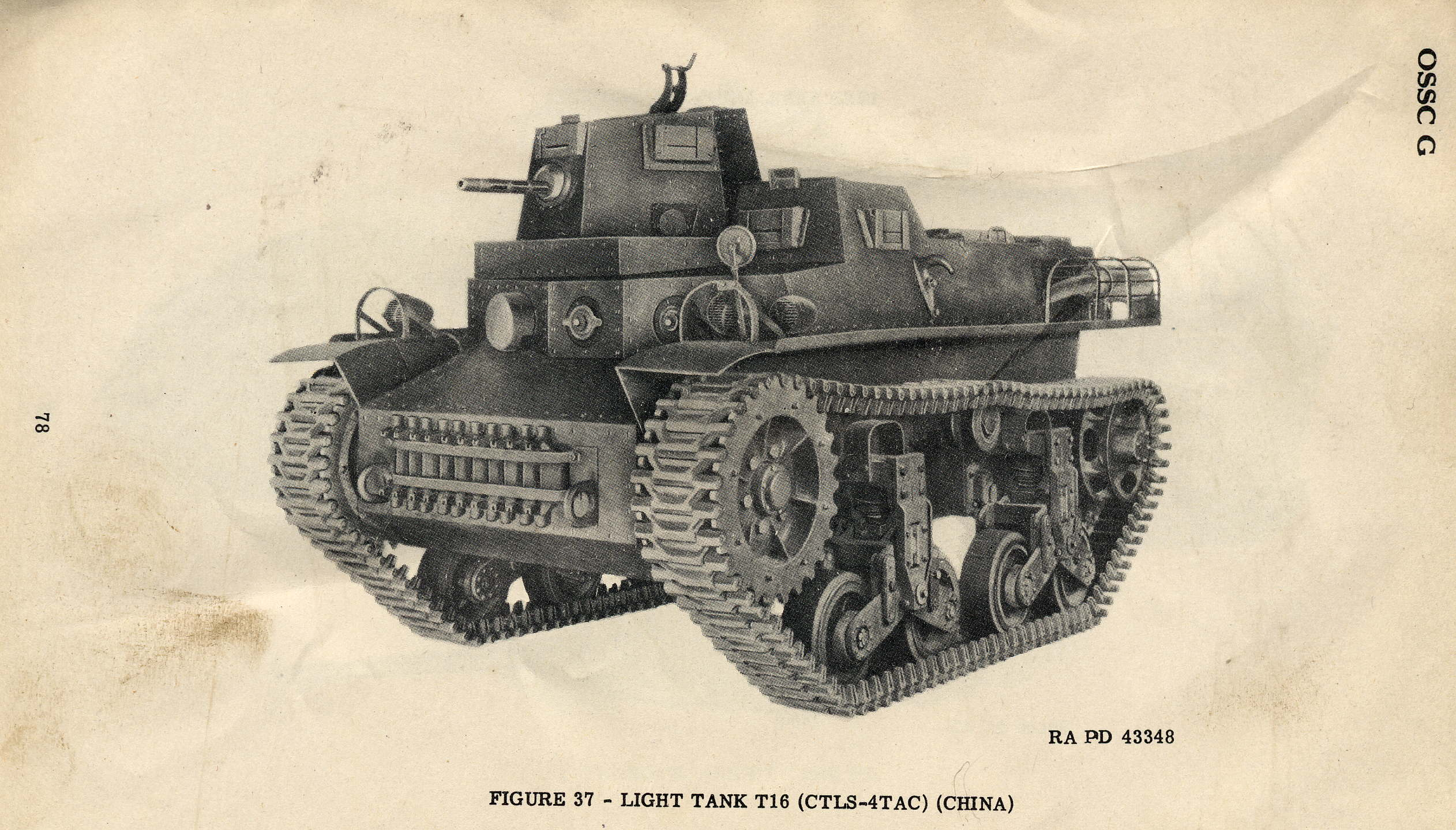
T16 light tank

- G-171
  - T16 light tank, Marmon-Herrington, model CTLS-4TAC
- G-172
  - M2 crane, truck mounted, and M16 trailer for clamshell.
- G-173
  - M12 gunnery trainer tank, 75-mm gun
- G-174
  - motor toboggan, Carl Eliason, model C. snowmobile Four Wheel Drive Co.
- G-175
  - Special tool combat vehicle
- G-176
  - M20 armored car, 6×6
- G-177
  - trailer, 5-ton, ammo handling truck.
- G-178
  - Ordnance maintenance truck, 2 1/2-ton, 6×6, GMC CCKW
  - M23 Instrument Bench Truck
- G-179
  - M29 Weasel
- G-180
  - T3 mine exploder
- G-181
  - light wheeled tractor, Case, model LA1
- G-182
  - kits, standard hardware, and shop supplies
- G-183
  - T23 medium tank, T20 medium tank
- G-184
  - M6 tractor, high speed, 38-ton, Allis-Chalmers
- G-185
  - M32 tank recovery vehicle
  - M32B1
- G-186
  - M32 tank recovery vehicle
  - M32B2
- G-187
  - M32A1 tank recovery vehicle
  - M32B3
- G-188
  - M32A1 tank recovery vehicle
  - M32B4
- G-189
  - M1 bomb lift truck Weaver Mfg. co.
- G-190
  - M4E5 medium tank, Continental engine
- G-191
  - M4E5 medium tank, Ford engine
- G-192
  - motorized shop, truck, 1 1/2 ton 4x2, Type AAB,
- G-193
  - T10 medium shop tractor (false name for searchlight equipped M3 medium tank), See Canal Defence light
- G-194
  - M7 snow tractor, Allis-Chalmers
- G-195
  - M19 snow trailer, 1-ton
- G-196
  - T10 medium tractor, Cletrac model MG-2
- G-197
  - T23E1 medium tank (Fisher)
- G-198
  - T26E1 heavy tank (Fisher)
- G-199
  - M7B1 gun motor carriage, 105-mm howitzer, Pressed Steel Car Co.

== G-200 to G-299 ==
- G-200
  - M24 Chaffee 75-mm M6 gun
- G-201
  - M16 trailer, for clamshell scoop
- G-202
  - M31A1 tank recovery vehicle, M3A3 w/crane
- G-203
  - M31B2 tank recovery vehicle, M3A5 w/crane
- G-204
  - M4A3 medium tank, 75-mm gun, wet, GMC
- G-205
  - M4A3 medium tank, 76-mm gun, wet, Chrysler
- G-206
  - M4 medium tank, 76-mm gun, wet
- G-207
  - M4A1 medium tank, 76-mm gun, wet, Pressed Steel Car Co.
- G-208
  - Landing Vehicle Tracked MK-II, armored, Food Machinery Corporation
- G-209
  - Landing Vehicle Tracked MK-IIII, unarmored, Food Machinery Corporation
- G-210
  - M36 tank destroyer, gun motor carriage, for 90-mm gun, (T71 )
- G-212
  - M4A2 medium tank, 76-mm gun, wet, GMC
- G-213
  - M21 ammunition trailer, Trailer Company of America
- G-214
  - Landing Vehicle Tracked MK-IIII, Armored, 75-mm howitzer, Food Machinery Corporation.
- G-215
  - M34 tank recovery vehicle, (M32B1)
- G-216
  - M23 ammunition trailer, 8-ton, Utility Trailer Co.
- G-217
  - carriage, for M51 .50 cal MG.
- G-218
  - T1E1 mine exploder, (Sherman)
- G-219
  - T1E3 mine exploder, (Sherman)
- G-220
  - M20 trailer mount for Quadmount M45C, M55.

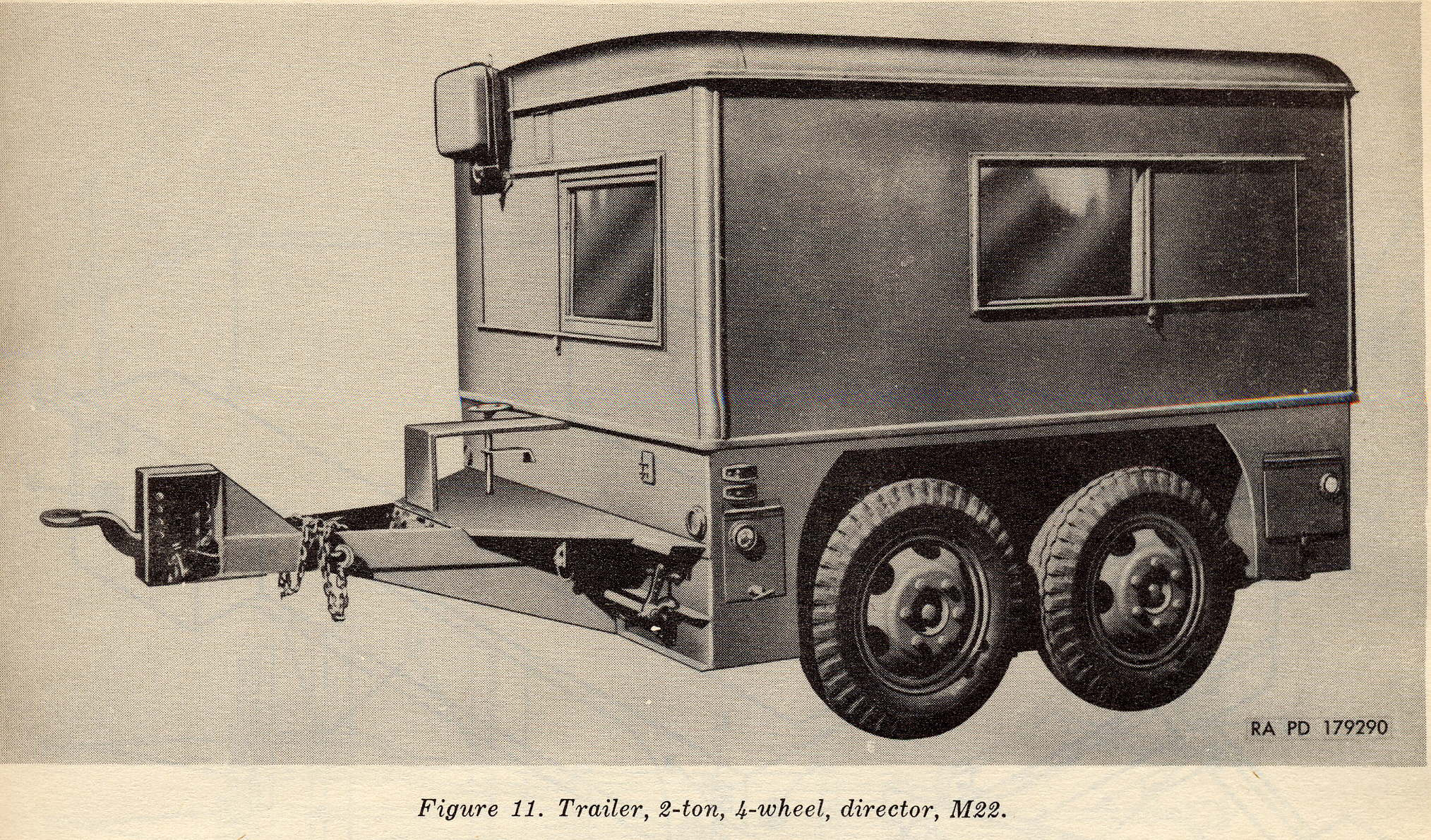
M22 director trailer

- G-221
  - M1 searchlight trailer, tilting bed,
  - M7 generator trailer
  - M13 director trailer, soft top, for gun data computer, and director
  - M14 director trailer, hard top, for gun data computer, and director
  - M17 mount trailer, mount for quadmount M45D, M51
  - M18 trailer
  - M22 director trailer, hard top,
  - Trailer 2-ton, with M7 smoke generator
- G-222
  - M33 tank recovery vehicle
- G-223
  - M35 gun motor carriage, 3-inch gun,
- G-224
  - T53 bomb trailer, 1-ton Strick Co.
- G-225
  - M4A3E2 medium tank, Assault, 75-mm gun, wet. GMC
- G-226
  - M26 Pershing tank
- G-227
  - shop van
- G-228
  - M1 bulldozer (M4 sherman) blade, La Plante Choate Mfg. Co.
  - T5E3 mine excavator (Sherman)
- G-229
  - Ordnance maintenance truck, 2 1/2-ton, 6×6, GMC CCKW
  - M31 signal corps general repair truck
- G-230
  - M4A1 medium tank, 75-mm gun, wet,
- G-231
  - T36 snow tractor, 3-man, 7.500-Lbs, Iron Fireman Mfg. snow cruiser, (1944), 36 built.

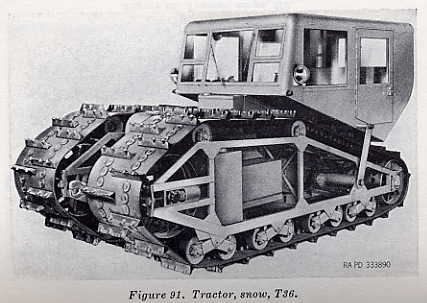
T36 snow tractor

- G-232
  - M40 gun motor carriage, 155-mm gun
  - M43 gun motor carriage, 8" howitzer, Pressed Steel Car Co.
- G-233
  - M36B1 gun motor carriage, 90-mm, M36 tank destroyer,
- G-234
  - Ordnance maintenance truck, 2 1/2-ton, 6×6, GMC CCKW
  - M32 tire repair truck, load-A, and Load-B.
  - M25 trailer, 1-ton, tire repair, A-load generator, B-load tools
- G-235
  - Ordnance maintenance truck, 2 1/2-ton, 6×6, GMC CCKW
  - M30 signal corps general repair truck
- G-236
  - M41 howitzer motor carriage, 155-mm howitzer
- G-237
  - M36B2 gun motor carriage, 90-mm, M36 tank destroyer
- G-238
  - M37 howitzer motor carriage, 105-mm howitzer
- G-239
  - T26E heavy tank, 105-mm howitzer,
- G-240
  - M29 bomb trailer 3/4-ton payload American Bantam Car Co.
- G-241
  - tank medium, 75-mm gun, wet,
- G-242
  - M19 gun motor carriage, 40-mm gun, wet, MXWH
- G-243
  - T1E4 mine exploder,
  - T1E6
- G-244
  - M46 Patton tank
- G-245
  - M76 Otter amphibious cargo carrier
- G-246
  - M3 tank dozer
- G-247
  - M2 bulldozer, M4A3 sherman
- G-248
  - M19 gun motor carriage
  - M19A1 GMC – gun motor carriage, dual 40-mm M2A1 guns,
- G-249
  - winterization kits (at least 54 volumes)
  - Vol. 1, personnel heaters, Stewart-Warner
  - Vol. 2, Engine heaters, Perfection
  - Vol. 3, Winterization Kit for cold starting aid, (slave kit) M40.
  - Vol. 4, MB/GPW's
  - Vol. 5, 3/4-ton WC's and 1 1/2-ton WC's. DEC-1954
  - Vol. 6, GMC-CCKW
  - Vol. 7, M-29 Weasel
  - Vol. 8, truck 2.5-ton, 6×6, cargo, COE, (Note: (Cab Over Engine design)) GMC-AFKWX353, (G-508)
  - Vol. 9, M38 jeeps
  - Vol. 10, M37, 3/4 ton trucks
  - Vol. 11, Chevrolet 1 1/2-ton, 4×4
  - Vol. 12, truck 2.5-ton, M34, and M35
  - Vol. 13, Winterization Equipment for Truck 2.5-ton, 6×6, M135 series.
- G-250
  - deep water fording kits
- G-251
  - M41 Walker Bulldog Cadillac
- G-252
- M8 tractor
  - M8A1 high-speed tractor with bulldozer
- G-253
  - M42 Duster 40-mm
- G-254
  - T48 Tank 90-mm gun, M48 Patton
- G-255
  - T42 Tank 90-mm gun
- G-256
  - T43 Tank, 120-mm gun
- G-257
  - T99 gun motor carriage, 155-mm howitzer,
- G-258
  - T98E1 gun motor carriage, 105-mm gun
- G-259
  - T97 gun motor carriage, 155-mm gun
  - M53 155-mm self-propelled gun
- G-260
  - T18E1 apc full track, M75 (APC)
- G-261
  - M55 self-propelled howitzer T108 gun motor carriage, 8" howitzer (see G-259)
- G-262
  - M47 Patton tank
- G-263
  - T17 tank trainer, 76-mm gun
- G-264
  - T18 tank trainer, 90-mm gun
- G-265
  - M4 tank bulldozer
- G-266
  - M8 tractor
  - T8E4 bulldozer tractor
- G-268
  - M249 truck, 4×4, gun lifting
- G-269
  - T39E1 combat engineer vehicle
- G-270
  - T44 cargo tractor
- G-271
  - T4E1 wrecker, high-speed tractor
- G-272
  - T6 wrecker, high-speed tractor
- G-273
  - T44 cargo tractor
- G-274
  - M51-T51 tank recovery vehicle
- G-275
  - M3E1 tank bulldozer
- G-276
  - T16 tank bulldozer
- G-277
  - LVTA6 LVT-5
- G-278
  - T18E1 tank bulldozer
- G-279
  - M44 self-propelled howitzer, 155-mm howitzer
- G-280
  - M59 (APC)
  - M59-T74 tank recovery vehicle
- G-281
  - M74 tank recovery vehicle, medium, (Sherman)
- G-284
  - Tank dozer t-18
- G-285
  - M20 tank gunnery trainer, 90-mm gun
- G-286
  - M6 tankdozer, (on M47 tank)
- G-287
  - M48A2 tank
  - M26 trainer
  - M67A1 flame thrower
- G-288
  - M50 Ontos tank
- G-289
  - M56 Scorpion tank
- G-291
  - M8A1 tankdozer, (on M48A2 tank)
- G-292
  - M60 Patton tank
- G-293
  - M501 loader for Hawk missile
- G-294
  - M113 armored personnel carrier
- G-295
  - M107 self-propelled gun
- G-296
  - M108 self-propelled gun M108 howitzer
  - M109 self-propelled gun M109 howitzer
- G-298
  - M88 recovery vehicle
- G-299
  - M116 cargo carrier, tracked, Husky

== G-300 to G-399 ==
Note, these are largely unused, or unknown.

- G-300
  - M114 carrier, command and reconnaissance, Cadillac
- G-301
  - M60A1 Armoured vehicle-launched bridge
- G-302
  - Unknown
- G-303
  - M728 Combat Engineer Vehicle
- G-304
  - Unknown
- G-305
  - M48A3 tank 90-mm gun,
- G-306
  - M9 tankdozer, (M60 tank)
- G-307
  - M17 tank trainer, 76-mm gun, (M41)
- G-308
  - Unknown
- G-309
  - M578 light recovery vehicle
- G-310
  - M551 Sheridan
- G-311
  - M4 simulator, tank gunfire
- G-312
  - M113 armored personnel carrier
- G-314
  - M8A2 tankdozer, (M48 tank)
- G-315
  - M104, self-propelled howitzer, 105-mm,
- G-316
  - M67A2 tank, flame thrower, (M48 tank)
- G-317 to G-335 unknown
- G-336
  - M60A1E2 152-mm gun, launcher,
- G-337 to G-352 unknown
- G-353
  - M759 carrier, cargo,
- G-354
  - Unknown
- G-355
  - M48A4 tank, 105-mm gun,
- G-356 to G-389 unknown
- G-390
  - M667 carrier, guided missile, (lance)
- G-391
  - Unknown
- G-392
  - M706 armored car,
- G-393
  - M727 carrier, guided missile, (Hawk)
- G-394
  - M730 carrier, guided missile, (Chaparral)
- G-395
  - M606 truck, 1/4-ton, utility,
- G-396
  - M729 tank,
- G-397 to G-399 unknown

== G-400 to G-499 ==
Never used

== G-500 to G-599 ==
- G-501
  - Truck, 2 1/2-ton, 6×6, amphibian, GMC Model DUKW-353
- G-502
  - Truck, 3/4 ton, 4×4 Dodge
    - Truck, ambulance, 3/4 ton, 4×4, Dodge WC54
    - Truck, carryall, 3/4 ton, 4×4, Dodge WC-53
    - Truck, command reconnaissance, 3/4 ton, 4×4 WC-56, WC-57, WC-58
    - Truck, weapons carrier, 3/4 ton, 4×4, Dodge WC-51, Dodge WC-52
    - Truck, maintenance, utility, light, Dodge WC-60
    - Truck, telephone and light maintenance K-50 truck, K-50B truck
- G-503
  - Truck, 1/4-ton, 4×4, Command Reconnaissance – Willys MB and Ford GPW, (now generally known as the WW II jeep)
- G-504
  - Truck, 1/4-ton, 4×4, amphibian, Ford GPA
- G-505
  - Truck, 1/2 ton, 4×4 Dodge
    - Model VC-1 to VC-6
    - Model WC-1, WC-3 to WC-27
    - Model WC-40 to WC-43
- G-506
  - Truck, 1 1/2-ton, 4×4 (Chevrolet)
    - Model G-7103 Book Symbol NE – Cab (Tractor), w/o Winch (Note: The Chevrolet G-506, G-7000 numbers were also hyphenated, see the index page of their manual TM 10-1557)
    - Model G-7105 Book Symbol NG – Panel Body, see also K-51 truck
    - Model G-7106 Book Symbol NH – Dump Body, w/o Winch
    - Model G-7107 Book Symbol NJ – Cargo Body, w/o Winch
    - Model G-7113 Book Symbol NE – Cab (Tractor)
    - Model G-7116 Book Symbol NL – Dump Body, With Winch
    - Model G-7117 Book Symbol NM – Cargo Body, With Winch
    - Model G-7163 Book Symbol NR – Telephone Body, With Earth Borer, see also K-44 truck
    - Model G-7173 Book Symbol NS – Telephone Maintenance Body, see also K-43 truck
    - Model – Stake and Platform COE, K-33 truck
    - Model – Stake and Platform COE, K-54 truck
    - E5 Turret Trainer
    - J3 field lighting truck
    - J4 field lighting truck
    - J5 field lighting truck
    - fire truck, class 135, fog and foam,
- G-507
  - Truck, 1 1/2 ton, 6×6, personnel and cargo (Dodge)
  - Model WC-62 and WC-63 or T223
- G-508
  - Truck, 2 1/2-ton, 6×6, GMC CCKW
  - CCKW 352 Chassis (SWB)
  - CCKW 353 Chassis (LWB)
  - M1 Van, Chemical service
  - M7 Van, small arms repair
  - M8 Van, auto repair
  - M9 Van, artillery repair
  - M10 Van, instrument repair
  - M12 Van, welding
  - M13 Van, tool and bench
  - M14 Van, spare parts
  - M16 Van, machine shop
  - M18 Van, electrical repair
  - M23 Van, Instrument bench
  - M27/27B1 Bomb service
  - M30 Signal corps repair
  - M32 Tire repair
  - Cargo (SWB)
  - Cargo (LWB)
  - Dump
  - Engineer
  - Air compressor
  - Earth boring
  - Pontoon bolster
  - Fuel tanker
  - Fuel service (tanker w/pumps)
  - Water tanker
  - Water purification
  - Stock rack (for cavalry horses)
  - Class 530 Fire pumper
  - Van (Dental operating)
  - Van (Kitchen)
  - Van (others, 17 versions total)
- G-509
  - Truck, 4-ton, 6×6, Diamond T
  - Prime mover cargo
  - Ponton cargo
  - Dump
  - Wrecker
  - Swinging boom crane
  - Water distributor, 1,000 US gal (3,800 L)
  - Flatbed with rear winch,
  - Asphalt distributor, 800 US gal (3,000 L)
  - Reproduction Equipment, Press Section,
  - Tractor
  - V-8 prime mover, with two PE-127 generators, for AN/MPN-1
  - V-10 prime mover, with two PE-127 generators, for AN/MPN-1A
  - V-11 prime mover, with two PE-127 generators, for AN/MPN-1B

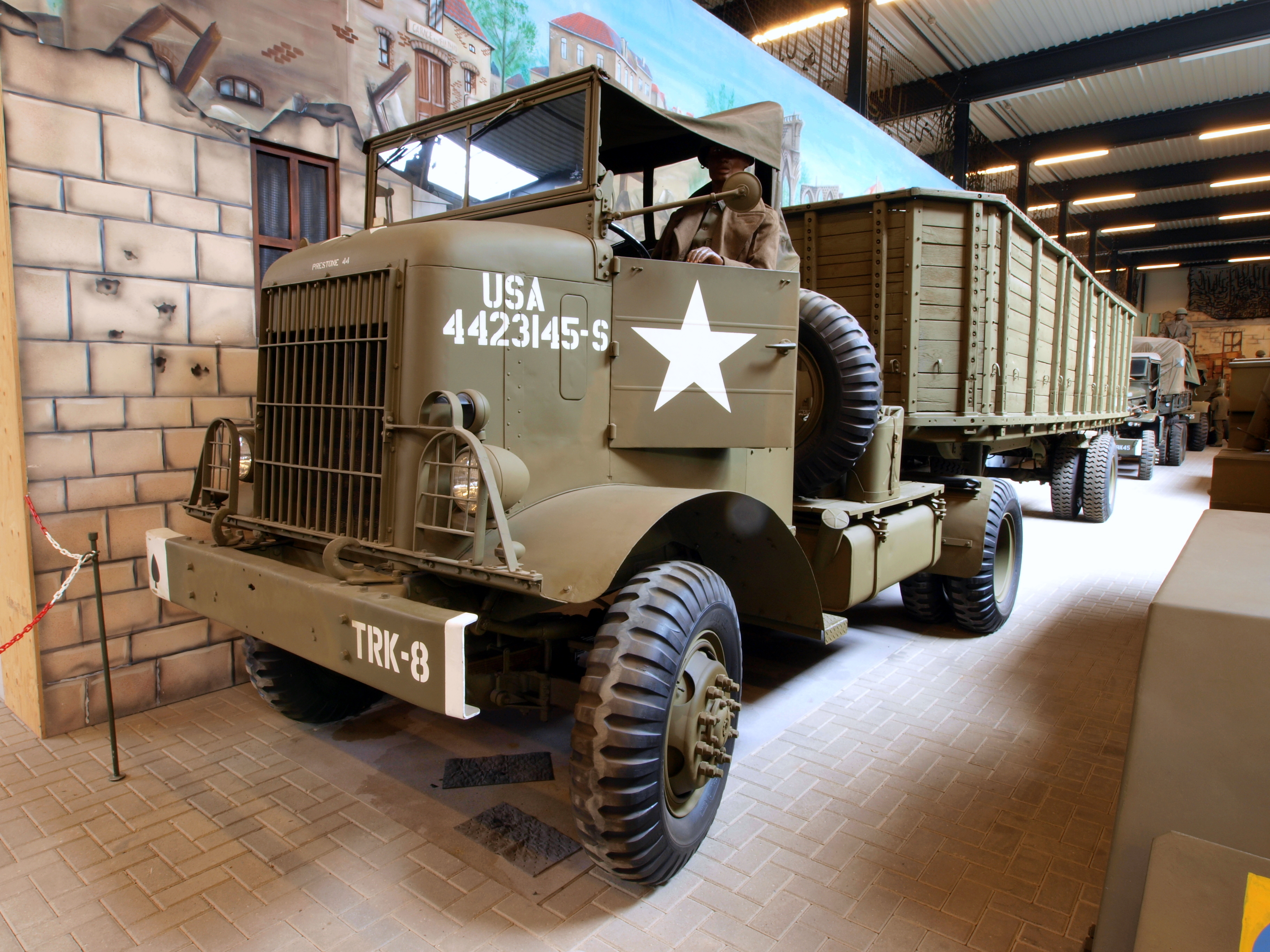
G-510, Autocar, COE

- G-510
  - Truck, 4- to 5-ton, 4×4, COE tractor, Autocar U7144T
- G-511
  - Truck, 5-6-ton, 4x4, Autocar U8144T
  - COE Ponton tractor
  - K-30 truck, K-31 truck, K-62 truck, van type for SCR-270
- G-512
  - Truck, 6-ton, 6×6, prime mover, Corbitt
- G-513
  - Truck, 4- to 5-ton, 4×4, Federal Motor Truck
  - COE tractor
  - COE K-32 radio van
- G-514
  - Truck, 6-ton, 6×6, prime mover, White Motor Co.
  - K-56 truck, SCR-268, and SCR-545 van type
- G-515
  - trailer, 1/2-ton, cargo, van, Miller
- G-516
  - Trailer, 1/2 ton payload, 4 wheel, tandem axle, mobile command post, (miller CP-1)
- G-517
  - Trailer, 1-ton, Mobile Communication, K-19 trailer
- G-518
  - Trailer, 1-ton, 2-wheel, cargo, Ben-Hur MFG. CO. et al.
  - K-52 trailer
  - K-63 trailer
  - K-63B trailer
  - M24 ammunition trailer
  - M25 trailer, tire repair, (load-A, and B)
  - V-15 trailer, for AN/TPQ-2, Antenna mount.
- G-519
  - Bicycle, military, universal
  - Bicycle, military, women's, M306
- G-520
  - 15 passenger bus, converted type, Chevrolet, (limousine type)
  - 5 passenger car, 4×2, light sedan Chevrolet
- G-521
  - 5 passenger car, 4×2 light sedan, Plymouth
- G-522
  - 5 passenger car, 4×2 light sedan, Ford
- G-523
  - Motorcycle model, Harley-Davidson WLA also ELA
- G-524
  - Motorcycle model 640-B, Indian (motorcycle) Co. also 340
- G-525
  - Semitrailer, 6-ton Highway trailer Co.
- G-526
  - Truck, 6-ton, 6x6, prime mover, White Motor Co.
- G-527
  - Trailer, 1-ton, 2-wheel, 250 Gallon water tank ("Water buffalo")
- G-528
  - Truck, 10-ton, 6×4, Mack NR
- G-529
  - trailer 1/4-ton, cargo, Amphibian, (jeep trailer)
  - K-38A trailer telephone cable splicer
- G-530
  - Semitrailer, 3 1/2-ton, Combination Stake and Platform,
- G-531
  - Truck, 4-ton, 4×4, Cargo, Four Wheel Drive Co. model HAR-1
- G-532
  - Truck, 7 1/2-ton, 6×6, prime mover, Mack NO
- G-533
  - Truck, 5-ton, 4×2, Mack Truck
- G-534
  - Semitrailer, 6-ton, Textile Repair, Carter Mfg. Co.
- G-535
  - Truck, 6-ton, 6×6, prime mover, Mack NM
- G-536
  - Truck, 5-ton tractor, Autocar Company
- G-537
  - trailer, 6-ton, cargo, Hobbs
- G-538
  - semitrailer, 6-ton, laundry, Lufkin
- G-539
  - Truck, 2 1/2-ton, 4×2 Federal Motor Truck Co.
  - Dump Truck,
  - Telephone Maintenance, Diamond T
- G-540
  - Truck, 1 1/2-ton, 4×2, Ford,
  - combination stake, and platform
  - dump
  - Fire Truck, High pressure Fog/foam
  - Fire Truck, Pumper, 500 GPM,
  - Tractor,
- G-541
  - Dump Truck, 2 1/2-ton, 4×2, International Harvester
- G-542
  - Truck, 5-ton, 4×2, International Harvester
- G-543
  - trailer, 1-ton, cargo, American Bantam
- G-544
  - Semitrailer, 7-ton, combination stake and platform, Edwards Iron Works
- G-545
  - Semitrailer, 6-ton, van
- G-546
  - Semitrailer, 7-ton, combination stake and platform, W. C. Nabors Co.
- G-547
  - Truck, 6-ton, 6×6, bridge erector, Brockway Motor Co.
  - Fire truck, high pressure fog/foam,
- G-548
  - Metropolitan ambulance 3/4-ton, 4×2, Packard
- G-549
  - Metropolitan ambulance 3/4-ton, 4×2, Cadillac
- G-550
  - Station wagon, 5-passenger, 4×2, Pontiac
- G-551
  - Motor scooter with package carrier, Cushman model 39
- G-552
  - Truck, amphibious, 3/4-ton, 4×4, XAC-3, Aqua Cheetah, Amphibious Car Co. (upgrade of G-614)
- G-553
  - Truck, ordnance maintenance, 1 1/3-3-ton, 4×4, GMC
- G-554
  - Truck, 2 1/2-ton, 4×2, Diamond T
  - Telephone maintenance
  - Cargo
  - Dump
- G-555
  - Truck, dump, 5-ton, 4×2, Federal
- G-556
  - Truck, 8-ton, 6×4, Corbitt
  - Tractor
- G-557
  - Truck, 10-ton, dump, Mack truck
- G-558
  - Semitrailer, gas tanker, 2,000 Gal. Freuhauf
- G-559
  - Semitrailer, 2-ton, shoe repair, Gerstenslager, and K55 (Miller)
- G-560
  - Semitrailer, 3 1/2-ton, Combination Stake and Platform, Checker
- G-561
  - semitrailer, 3-ton, van, Gramm model DF-40
- G-562
  - semitrailer, 3 1/2-ton, Combination Stake and Platform, Checker model C-4
- G-563
  - semitrailer, 3 1/2-ton, Combination Stake and Platform, Dorsey model D-S
- G-564
  - Semitrailer, 3 1/2-ton, Combination Stake and Platform, Hobbs, model 5-DF
- G-565
  - Semitrailer, 6-ton, Combination Stake and Platform, Kingham Trailer Co. Model H-308
- G-566
  - semitrailer, 3-ton,
- G-567
  - Semitrailer, 3 1/2-ton, Combination Stake and Platform, Utility Trailer Manufacturing Company
- G-568
  - Semitrailer, 6-ton, Combination Stake and Platform, Winter-Wiess
- G-569
  - Semitrailer, shoe repair, 6-ton, Gerstenslager
- G-570
  - semitrailer, 3-ton, Van, Carolina
- G-571
  - semitrailer, 3-ton, Van, Steel products
- G-572
  - semitrailer, 7-ton, cargo, Highway trailer Co.
- G-573
  - semitrailer, 6-ton, Clothing repair van, Rivers
- G-574
  - semitrailer, 5-ton, wheel pole, Dorsey
- G-575
  - Semitrailer, 3-ton, Refer, American body
- G-576
  - semitrailer, 5-ton, House, K-55 trailer,
- G-577
  - Semitrailer, 5-ton, Refer, Trailer Co. of America
- G-578
  - Semitrailer, 8-ton, Combination Stake and Platform, Mack Truck
- G-579
  - semitrailer, 3-ton, Van, Highway trailer Co.
- G-580
  - Semitrailer, 6-ton, Combination Animal and Cargo. Gramm
- G-582
  - Semitrailer, 3 1/2-ton, Combination Stake and Platform,
- G-581
  - Semitrailer, 10-ton, Combination Stake and Platform, Fruehauf trailer
- G-582
  - Semitrailer, 3 1/2-ton, Combination Stake and Platform, Strick
- G-583
  - semitrailer, 6-ton, Map reproducing van, Travelcar
- G-584
  - Semitrailer, 6-ton, Laundry, Gramm Motor and Trailer Co.
- G-585
  - Motorcycle, solo, Harley Davidson (shaft Drive), Harley-Davidson XA
- G-586
  - Semitrailer, 10-ton, Textile Repair van, Gramm Motor and Trailer Co.
- G-587
  - Semitrailer, 6-ton, 2-wheel, Textile Repair van, (10-ton gross), 1942 (Kentucky 4QB)
- G-588
  - Semitrailer, 6-ton, 2-wheel, Textile Repair/cargo van, (10-ton gross), 1942 Utility Trailer Manufacturing Company
- G-589
  - Semitrailer, 6-ton, 2-wheel, Sterilizer and Bath van, 1942 (Hyde 22-S)
- G-590
  - Semitrailer, 6-ton, 2-wheel, Sterilizer and Bath, (10-ton gross), 1942 (Strick 400)
- G-591
  - Semitrailer, 6-ton, 2-wheel, Sterilization & Bath, laundry, clothing, shoe and textile repair, (10-ton gross), 1942–43 – Timpte T-8 or Rivers Body et al.
- G-592
  - Semitrailer, 6-ton, Mobile Records Van,
- G-593
  - Semitrailer, 10-ton gross, 2-wheel, van, 1942, Gentry
- G-594
  - Semitrailer, 10-ton, van, Highway Trailer Co.
- G-595
  - Semitrailer, 7-ton, panal cargo, Gramm Motor and Trailer Co.
- G-596
  - Semitrailer, 7-ton, Cargo, Highway Trailer Co.
- G-597
  - Semitrailer, 7-ton, Cargo, Carter
- G-598
  - Semitrailer, 7-ton, Cargo, Whitehead
- G-599
  - Semitrailer, 11-ton, Refer, Hyde model KR-20

== G-600 to G-699 ==
- G-600
  - Semitrailer, 7 1/2-ton, Low Platform,
- G-601
  - Semitrailer, 10-ton, stake, Fruehauf trailer co.
- G-602
  - Semitrailer, 10-ton, low bed, Highway trailer Co.
- G-603
  - Semitrailer, 12 1/2-ton, van, Fruehauf trailer co.
- G-604
  - Semitrailer, 22 1/2-ton, Low Platform, Trailer Co. of America
- G-605
  - trailer 1/2-ton, public address van.
- G-606
  - 2-Horse Trailer, 1-ton, van,
- G-607
  - trailer, 4-ton, van, Superior
- G-608
  - trailer, 5-ton, refer, low bed, American body
- G-609
  - trailer, 5-ton, van, Corbitt
- G-610
  - trailer, 20-ton, platform, Jahn
- G-611
  - MO-PED, Airborne, Simplex
- G-612
  - 1/2-ton, Chevrolet, 4×2, Model BD-1001 up
  - model carryall
  - model pickup
  - model canopy express
- G-613
  - Truck, 1/2-ton, 4 × 2, Dodge
    - Model WC-36 to WC-39 (T-112)
    - Model WC-47 to WC-50 (T-112)
- G-614
  - Truck, 1/2-ton, 4×4, XAC-2, Amphibious, Aqua cheetah, Amphibian Car Corp.
- G-615
  - truck, 1/2-ton, 4×2 Ford
  - model pickup
- G-616
  - truck, 3/4-ton, 4×2, Chevrolet
    - panel delivery
    - pickup
- G-617
  - Truck, 1 1/2-ton, 4×2, semi-tractor, Chevrolet
  - light maintenance, and installation: 1/2-ton K-50 truck
  - combination stake and platform
  - cargo
  - canopy express
  - dump
  - pickup
  - Fire Truck, Brush
  - Tractor
- G-618
  - Truck, 1 1/2-ton, 4x2, Dodge
    - VF-31 (T-98), cargo
    - WF-31 (T-118), closed cab chassis
    - WF-31 (T-118), tractor
    - WF-32 (T-118), cargo
  - Fire truck, pumper, class 325, Equipment by W.S. Darley Corp.
  - Fire truck, pumper, class 525, Equipment by Hahn Motor Truck co.
- G-619
  - Truck, 1 1/2-ton, 4×4, Ford
- G-620
  - Truck 1 1/2-ton, 4×2, GMC, Yellow Coach
  - (LC), COE, K-18 truck, Model No. CF-351
- G-621
  - Truck, 1 1/2-ton, 4×4 Dodge
    - VF-401, closed cab, cargo
    - VF-402, closed cab, cargo, with winch
    - VF-403, closed cab, dump
    - VF-404, closed cab, cargo
    - VF-405, closed cab, cargo, with winch
    - VF-406, closed cab, dump
    - VF-407, Ambulance
- G-622
  - Truck, 1 1/2-ton, 4×4, cargo, Ford Motor Company Ford GTB or MK-I
    - GTB Truck Cargo (Box Bed) 1 1-2T 4×4 w Rear Duals
    - GTBA Truck Cargo (Box Bed) 1 1-2T 4×4 w Rear Duals
    - GTBB Truck Wrecker w Hoist Boom 1 1-2T 4×4 w Rear Duals
    - GTBS Truck Bomb Service 1T 4×4 w Single Rear Tires
    - GTBC Truck Bomb Service 1 1-2T 4×4 w Rear Dual
- G-623
  - Truck, 2 1/2-ton, 4×2, cargo, GMC
- G-624
  - Dump Truck, 2 1/2-ton Mack Truck
- G-625
  - Truck, 2 1/2-ton, 4×2, REO
- G-626
  - Truck, 2 1/2-ton, 4x4, C.O.E., Autocar
    - U-2044, oil service tanker, 1940–41
    - U-4044, oil service tanker, 1940–41
    - U-4144, oil service tanker, 1941
    - U-4044-T, tractor, 1940-41
    - U-4144-T, tractor, 1941
- G-627
  - Truck, 2 1/2-ton, Tractor, GMC
- G-628
  - Searchlight Truck 2 1/2-ton, 6×4, COE, GMC model AFWX-354
- G-629
  - Searchlight Truck 2 1/2-ton, 6×4, Mack Truck
- G-630
  - Truck, 2 1/2-ton, 6×6, 5-ton, 6x4, Studebaker US6
    - U1 Cargo (SWB w/o winch)
    - U2 Cargo (SWB w winch)
    - U3 Cargo (LWB w/o winch)
    - U4 Cargo (LWB w winch)
    - U5 Tanker (750 gallon)
    - U6 Semi-tractor (6x4)
    - U7 Cargo (6x4 w/o winch)
    - U8 Cargo (6x4 w winch)
    - U9 Cab and chassis (LWB w/o winch)
    - U10 Dump (rear dump w/o winch)
    - U11 Dump (rear dump w winch)
    - U12 Dump (side dump w/o winch)
    - U13 Dump (side dump w winch)
- G-631
  - Motorcycle solo, 45 cid, V-2, Shaft drive Indian, model Indian 841
- G-632
  - Truck, 4-ton, 4×4, Van, AFX-804, GMC
- G-633
  - Truck, 4-ton, Wrecker, White Motor Co. Model 950-X-6
- G-634
  - Truck, 5-ton, 4×2, dump, Autocar
- G-635
  - Truck, 5-ton, 4×4, COE Tractor, Autocar U5044-T
- G-636
  - Truck, 5-ton, GMC, CCW-353
- G-637
  - Truck, 5-ton, cargo, International Harvester
- G-638
  - Truck, 5-6-ton, 4×4, COE, Four Wheel Drive Co.
- G-639
  - Truck, 5-6-ton, 4×4, COE tractor, Mack NJU
- G-640
  - Truck, 6-ton, 4×2, Dump, Diesel, Mack Truck
- G-641
  - Truck, 7 1/2-ton, 6×6, Tractor, Minneapolis-Moline
- G-642
  - Truck 10-ton, 6×4, cargo, White Motor
- G-643
  - Truck, 7 1/2-ton, 6×6, cargo, HUG
- G-644
  - 5-passenger sedan, 4×2, medium, Packard
- G-645
  - Truck, 20 Ton, 6×4, Diesel, REO 28X
- G-646
  - Truck, 1/2-ton, 4×2, GMC AC-101
  - carryall
  - pickup
- G-647
  - Truck, 5-ton, 4×2, Dump, GMC
- G-648
  - Tractor Truck, 20-ton, 6×6, (Diesel) Federal Motor Truck Co.
- G-649
  - Truck, 5-6 Ton, 4×4, Timber hauler, COE, Four Wheel Drive Co.
- G-650
  - Fire Truck, 4×2, pumper, Mack Truck
- G-651
  - Truck, 2 1/2-ton, 6×6, International M-5H-6
  - Cargo
  - Dump
  - Pipeline
  - Tanker
  - Telephone
  - Fire
- G-652
  - Truck, 5-ton, 6×4, Wrecker, Mack Truck
- G-653
  - Autocar master parts list
- G-654
  - Chevrolet master parts list
- G-655
  - GMC master parts list
- G-656
  - Studebaker master parts list
- G-657
  - Dodge master parts list
- G-658
  - Ford master parts list
- G-659
  - International Harvester master parts list
- G-660
  - M10 ammunition trailer, Fruehauf trailer co.
- G-661
  - Trailer, 7-ton, K-72 trailer, Van
- G-662
  - cart, jungle, 2-wheel Miller
- G-663
  - Semitrailer, 6 1/2-ton, pipe, Fruehauf trailer co.
- G-664
  - Semitrailer, 6-ton, Shoe Repair, Gerstenslager Co.
- G-665
  - Semitrailer, 6-ton, Clothing Repair, Rivers Body Factory
  - Semitrailer, 6-ton, Textile Repair, Carter Mfg. Co.
  - Semitrailer, 6-ton, Van,
- G-666
  - Truck, 12-ton, COE, stake, GMC,
- G-667
  - Semitrailer, 12-ton, flat bed, Fruehauf trailer co.
- G-668
  - Semitrailer, 12-ton, flat bed, Steel Products
- G-669
  - Truck, 6-ton, 6×6, cargo, White Motor Co. model 666-LMB
- G-670
  - Truck, 4-ton, 6×6. Dump, REO,
- G-671
  - Truck 5-ton, 4×2, International Harvester
  - M425 Tractor, COE,
  - M426 Tractor, COE,
- G-672
  - Motor scooter, 3-wheel, Cushman model 39
- G-673
  - Motorcycle, chain drive, Indian
- G-674
  - Motorcycle, chain drive, Indian
- G-675
  - Semitrailer, 5-ton, Combination Stake and Platform,
- G-676
  - M365 Dolly, 10-ton, Trailer converter, Fruehauf trailer co.
  - Semitrailer, 10-ton, Combination Stake and Platform,
- G-677
  - Semitrailer, 11-ton, 28' Van
- G-678
  - F2B Semitrailer, 2,000 Gal. Fuel Servicing, HeilCo.
- G-679
  - motor scooter, w/sidecar, Cushman, model 34
- G-680
  - motorcycle, Harley Davidson, model 40-UA
- G-681
  - Semitrailer, 11-ton, 28', Van, Trailer Co. of America
- G-682
  - Semitrailer, 11-ton, 28', Van, Black Diamond
- G-683
  - Motor Scooter, Airborne, Cushman Motor works model 53
- G-684
  - Truck, 4-ton, 4×4, with shovel crane, by Quick-Way truck shovel Co.
- G-685
  - trailer 1/4-ton, K-38 trailer telephone cable splicer.
- G-686
  - trailer 2-ton, K-36 trailer pole, and cargo
- G-687
  - trailer 5-ton, K-37 trailer pole, and cable hauler.
- G-688
  - 29 passenger bus, 4×2, international Harvester, model K5, KS5
- G-690
  - Truck, 6-ton, 6×6, Bridge erector, Brockway
- G-691
  - Truck, 4-5-ton, 4×4, White Motor Co.
  - Tractor, COE
- G-692
  - Truck, 7 1/2-ton, 6×6, Federal C-2
  - Tractor
  - Wrecker
  - Crane
- G-693
  - Trailer, 3/4-ton, pole hauler, York-Hoover
- G-695
  - dolly, trailer converter, K-83 dolly for K-78 trailer
- G-696
  - trailer 7-ton K-28 trailer,(B and C), for SCR-268
- G-697
  - trailer 5-ton K-34 trailer payload, SCR-268
- G-698
  - semitrailer 12-ton K-78 trailer, SCR-584 van, and antenna
- G-699
  - trailer 1 1/2 Ton, K-35 trailer, K-65 trailer, house, SCR-270

== G-700 to G-799 ==
- G-700
  - trailer 5-ton K-76 trailer, K-77 trailer, for SCR-527
- G-701
  - semitrailer 6-ton, K-67 trailer, SCR-547 antenna mount
- G-702
  - trailer 14-ton, K-75 trailer, SCR-545 antenna, and cab.
- G-703
  - semitrailer 8-ton, K-22 trailer, K-64 trailer, SCR-270, antenna mount.
- G-704
  - PG-45 Pigeon trailer, 1/2-ton, Weston trailer Co.
- G-705
  - trailer 3-ton, K-29 trailer for SCR-277
- G-706
  - Semitrailer 11-ton, 28' van, general cargo.
  - Semitrailer, 11-ton, 28' Van
- G-707
  - semitrailer 6-ton van, general cargo
- G-708
  - Dolly, light-duty, model DC-3
- G-709
  - Truck, 2 1/2-ton, 6×6, medical van,
- G-710
  - Trailer 20-ton & 22-ton, Low bed, Fruehauf Model CPT-20 & CPT-22 - Jahn Model LKD-620 Fruehauf trailer
- G-711
  - Signal Corps Van Bodies, K-53 truck
- G-712
  - Semitrailer, 11-ton, 28' Van
- G-713
  - M26 semitrailer 7-ton van, for gun computer M8N, and M8P
  - semitrailer 15-ton V-9 Trailer for AN/MPG-1 radar
- G-714
  - trailer 7-ton, low bed, K-84 trailer, for SCR-784
- G-715
  - M13 Set, Dolly and Track,
- G-716
  - PE-95 power units, Milleys engine model 441
- G-717
  - Truck, 2 1/2-ton, 6×4, 10,000 Gal. water sprinkler, [[Studebaker US6 2 1/2-ton 6x6 truck|Studebaker US6x4]]
- G-718
  - Truck, 2 1/2-ton, 6×4, 1,350 Gal. gasoline, [[Studebaker US6 2 1/2-ton 6x6 truck|Studebaker US6x4]]
- G-719
  - Trailer, 5-ton, cargo, Fruehauf trailer
- G-720
  - Trailer, 22-ton, low bed, La Cross model DF 6C-22
- G-721
  - M1 Cargo Sled, 1-ton
- G-722
  - Semitrailer, 6-ton, V-9 trailer AN/MPG-1
- G-723
  - Semitrailer, 11-ton, van, Fruehauf trailer model 228-L
- G-724
  - Trailer, 12-ton, V-5 Trailer, For AN/MPN
- G-725
  - Truck, 4-ton, 6×6, Torpedo, air corps, Diamond T
- G-726
  - M1 light motorcycle, Airborne, Indian,
- G-727
  - trailer 2 1/2-ton, Amphibian (used with DUKW) general cargo.
- G-728
  - trailer, 22-ton, low bed, La Cross model DF 6T-22
- G-729
  - Trailer, 7 1/2-ton, 2,500 Gal. Gasoline,
- G-730
  - Semitrailer, 2 1/2-ton, stake and platform, w/dolly, Highway trailer Co.
- G-731
  - metropolitan ambulance, 1 1/2-ton, 4×2, Linn coach and truck
- G-737
  - M1A1 cargo sled, 1-ton
- G-738
  - M14 cargo sled, 1-ton
- G-739
  - M14A1 cargo sled, 1-ton
- G-740
  - Willys M38 1/4 ton, truck, utility, 4×4,
  - (Willys truck, station wagon, 1/4 ton, 4×4, models 463 and 473) (Note: Included as G-740 non (standard) classified vehicle in Technical Manual TM9-2800-1 edition of 1953.)
- G-741
  - Dodge M37
  - M42 command truck
  - M43 ambulance
  - V-41 truck, telephone maintenance, also (M201)
  - V-126 truck, AN/MPX-7
  - M152 enclosed utility truck
- G-742
  - Truck, 2 1/2-ton, 6×6, M34 series
  - M34 Cargo (single rear tires)
  - M35 Cargo (dual rear wheels)
  - M36 Cargo (long wheelbase)
  - M46 Mobil shop
  - M47 Dump (single rear tires)
  - M48 Semi-tractor
  - M49 Fuel tanker
  - M50 Water tanker
  - M59 Dump (dual rear tires)
  - M60 light wrecker
  - M108 Crane truck
  - M109 Van truck (12-foot body)
  - M275 Semi-tractor (short wheelbase)
  - M292 Van truck (17-foot expansible body)
  - M342 Dump (HD dump body)
  - M387 Guided missile launcher
  - M398 Guided missile launcher
  - M756 Pipeline construction
  - M764 Earth boring & pole setter
  - Non-standard
    - V17 Telephone construction and maintenance
    - V18 Earth boring and pole setter
    - Class 530A Tactical fire pumper
    - 210 Compressors (WDS Davey and G1 LeRoi)
    - Water purification (1,500gph and 3,000gph)
- G-743
  - M104 cargo trailer, 1.5-ton
  - M105 cargo trailer, 1.5-ton
  - M106 water tank,
- G-744
  - Truck, 5-ton, 6×6, M39 series
  - M41 Truck, Cargo
  - M51 Truck, Dump
  - M52 Truck, Tractor
  - M54 (truck), Cargo
  - M55 Truck, Cargo, Extra Long Wheel Base (XLWB)
  - M61 Truck, Chassis
  - M62 Truck, Wrecker, medium
  - M63 Truck, Chassis
  - M64 Truck, Cargo Van
  - M139 Truck, Chassis
  - M139 Truck, Bridging
  - M246 Truck, Tractor, Wrecker
  - M289 Truck, Missile Launcher
  - M291 Truck, Van, Expansible
  - M328 Truck, Bridging
  - M386 Truck, Missile Launcher
  - M543 Truck, Wrecker, medium
  - M748 Truck, Bolster
- G-745
  - Dolly 6-ton, trailer converter, Heil Co.
- G-746
  - Dolly 10-ton, trailer converter, Springfield auto
- G-747
  - M100 Trailer 1/4-ton, Dunbar Kapple
  - M367 trailer K-38B trailer
- G-748
  - M101 trailer, 3/4-ton, cargo,
  - M116 trailer chassis
- G-749
  - Truck, 2 1/2-ton, 6×6, GMC
  - M135 Cargo (single rear tires)
  - M211 Cargo (dual rear tires)
  - M215 Dump (dual rear tires)
  - M216 Dump (single rear tires, Canada only)
  - M217 Gasoline tanker
  - M220 Shop van
  - M221 Semi-tractor
  - M222 Water tanker
- G-750
  - M126 trailer chassis, 12-ton Fruehauf trailer
  - M127 Trailer, stake
  - M128 van cargo
  - M129 van supply
  - M308 water tanker, 4000 Gal.
- G-751
  - semitrailer, 6-ton, 1 axle,
  - M117
  - M118 stake bed
  - M119 cargo van
  - M457 maintenance
  - M458 maintenance
  - M459 maintenance
  - M508 shop van
- G-754
  - M102 Trailer, 1 1/2-ton, Fruehauf trailer
  - M103 chassis
  - M104 cargo
  - M105 cargo
  - M106 water tank
  - M107 water tank
  - M448 shop van
- G-755
  - M131 semitrailer, gasoline, 5000 Gal.
- G-756
  - M200 trailer, chassis 3-ton, 1-axle, generator,
- G-758
  - M38A1 truck 1/4-ton, truck utility, Willys M38 Willys
  - M170 front line ambulance
- G-759
  - Ambulances and Hearses
- G-760
  - Automobiles, including station wagones
- G-761
  - Busses
- G-762
  - Motorcycles
- G-763
  - Trucks 1/4-ton
- G-764
  - Trucks 1/2 ton
- G-765
  - Trucks 3/4-ton
- G-766
  - Trucks 1-ton
- G-767
  - Trucks 1.1/2-ton
- G-768
  - Trucks 2.1/2-ton
- G-769
- Trucks 4-ton
- G-770
  - Trucks 5-ton
- G-771
  - Trucks 7-ton
- G-772
  - Semitrailers, 2- to 3.1/2-ton
- G-773
  - Semitrailers 5- to 6-ton
- G-774
  - Semitrailers, 10- to 11-ton
- G-775
  - Trailers 1-ton
- G-776
  - Trailers, 1.1/2-ton
- G-777
  - Trailers 2- and 2.1/2-ton
- G-778
  - Trailers, 3- and 3.1/2-ton
- G-779
  - Trailers, 5- and 6-ton
- G-780
  - power units, willys engine type, model CJ-3A.
- G-781
  - trailer, laundry, 2-wheel, 2-trailer,
- G-782
  - M271 trailer, 3.5 ton 1-axle, pole hauler
  - V-13 trailer
- G-783
  - ambulance 3/4-ton, metropolitan, Cadillac 5186, (1952)
- G-789
  - M242 trailer, van radar dish mount, for M33 fire control system, Nike (rocket)
  - M243 trailer, antenna hauler, for M33 fire control system, Nike (rocket)
  - M244 trailer, van, computer, for M33 fire control system, Nike (rocket)
  - M258 van, radar tracking central
  - M259 van, guided missile directors trailer
  - M260 low bed antenna mount
  - M261 flat bed, guided missile
  - M262 van, launch control station
  - M359 van, electronic repair shop
  - M382 van, electronic repair shop
  - M383 van, electronic repair shop
  - M406 low bed antenna mount
  - M424 van, guided missile directors trailer
  - M428 van, guided missile tracking station
  - M564 van, shop
  - M582 van, shop
  - M583 van, shop
- G-790
  - M173 tank transporter, trailer, 25-ton
- G-791
  - M160 tank transporter, trailer, 60-ton
- G-792
  - Truck, 10-ton, 6×6, M123 series
  - M123 Semi-tractor
  - M125 Cargo
- G-793
  - Sled, cargo, 2-ton, T-37
- G-797
  - M172 Semitrailer, Low Bed, 15-ton, 4-Wheel

== G-800 to G-899 ==
- G-800
  - M197 dolly, trailer converter, 6-ton
  - M198 dolly, trailer converter, 6-ton
- G-801
  - truck, and sedan, Chevrolet, 1929 to 1952
- G-802
  - M269 semitrailer, low bed, 12-ton,
  - M270 semitrailer, low bed, 12-ton,
- G-803
  - sedan, medium, Pontiac, 1935 to 1950
- G-804
  - truck, tractor, Diamond T, model 720
- G-805
  - truck, Dodge, series-B
- G-806
  - truck, Ford, series-F
  - Bus, Ford, series-F
- G-807
  - truck, GMC, models 400 thru 980
- G-808
  - truck, GMC, Models 100-22 to 150-22
- G-809
  - truck, tractor, 5-ton, 4×2, white model WC22PLT
- G-810
  - sedan, light, Ford, 1949–1951
- G-811
  - M199 dolly, trailer converter, 18-ton,
- G-812
  - trucks, 10-ton, see G-771
- G-813
  - M310 trailer 3 1/2-ton, cable reel, K37B trailer 1955
- G-814
  - XM147 super duck, 2.5-ton, 6×6, GMC
- G-815
  - M349 semitrailer, refer, 7.5-ton, 1-axel
- G-816
  - M345 trailer, platform, 10-ton,
- G-817
  - M278 trailer, water tank, 2000-Gal.
- G-819
  - M295 series semitrailers, 6-ton,
  - M313 semitrailer, van, expansible,
  - M447 semitrailer, van, shop,
  - M749 semitrailer, van, repair parts, and shop equipment
  - M750 semitrailer, van, parts storage,
- G-820
  - M349 semitrailer, refrigerator, 7.5-ton,
- G-821
  - M329 trailer, rocket transporter, Honest John
- G-822
  - M269 trailer, utility, 2.5-ton
- G-823
  - M274 truck platform, U.S. Military M274 Truck, Platform, Utility 1/2 Ton, 4X4 MULE
- G-824
  - M146 semitrailer, shop van, 6-ton,
- G-833
  - M33A1 semitrailer, trainer van, 3-ton
  - M348 semitrailer, van electronics, V-189 trailer, for AN/MSC-25
  - M373 semitrailer, van electronics,
  - M394 semitrailer, van medical,
  - XM1005 semitrailer, van electronic,
  - XM1007 semitrailer, van electronic,
- G-834
  - M601 truck, cargo, 1-ton, 4×4, Dodge
  - M615 ambulance
- G-835
  - M607 Truck, tractor, 2.5-ton
  - M608 Truck, dump, 2.5-ton
  - M609 Truck, shop van, 2.5-ton
  - M610 Truck, water tank, 1000 Gal. 2.5-ton
  - M611 Truck, gasoline tanker, 1200-Gal,
  - M612 Truck, van expansible,
  - M613 Truck, instrument repair shop,
  - M614 Truck, dump,
  - M616 Truck, chassis, 2.5-ton, 6×6,
  - M617 Truck, chassis, 2.5-ton, 6×6,
  - M618 Truck, chassis, 2.5-ton, 6×6,
  - M619 Truck, chassis, 2.5-ton, 6×6,
  - M620 Truck, chassis, 2.5-ton, 6×6,
- G-838
  - M151 1/4 Ton truck utility
- G-839
  - M390 trailer, chassis, 2-ton,
  - M514 trailer, chassis, 1-ton,
  - XM545 trailer, chassis, 1-ton,
- G-840
  - M389 trailer, chassis, 1-ton,
- G-842
  - M113 trailer, chassis, 3-ton
  - M114 trailer, low bed, 3-ton,
  - M455 trailer, low bed, 5-ton,
  - M456 trailer, low bed, 5-ton,
  - M460 trailer, van electronics, 5-ton,
  - M461 trailer, van electronic, 5-ton,
  - M518 trailer, transporter,
  - M525 trailer, chassis, 5-ton,
- G-843
  - M422 Mighty Mite
- G-845
  - M604 truck, cargo, 3/4-ton, 4×4,
- G-846
  - M605 truck, cargo, 2.5-ton, 6×6,
- G-847
  - M603 truck, utility, 1/4-ton, 4×4,
- G-848
  - M348 semitrailer, van electronic, 6-ton,
  - M373 semitrailer, van electronic,
- G-849
  - M454 trailer, chassis, 2.5-ton,

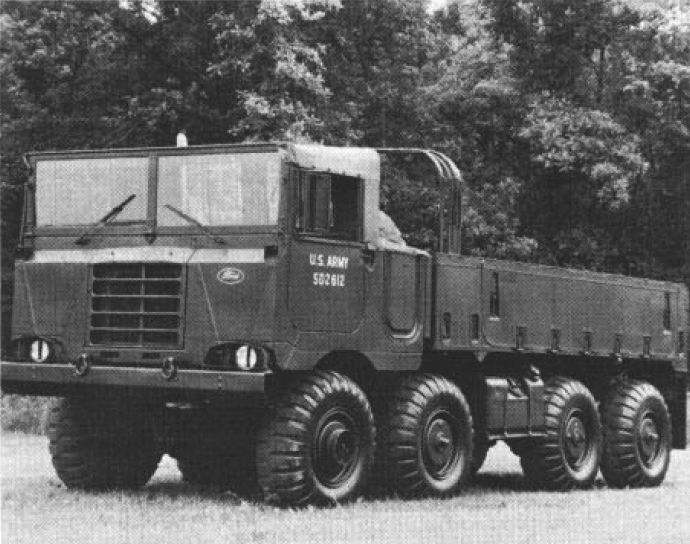
A Ford M656.

- G-852
  - truck, 5-ton, 8×8, Ford,
  - M656 truck, cargo,
  - M757 truck, tractor,
  - M791 truck, expansible van,
- G-854
  - M353 trailer, 3.5-ton,
- G-855
  - M162 semitrailer, low bed, 60-ton,
- G-856
  - M347 semitrailer, refer, 15-ton,
- G-857
  - M416 trailer, 1/4-ton, 1 axle,
  - M416A1
  - M416B1
  - M569 chassis, V-498 trailer for AN/TTC-41
- G-858
  - M529 trailer, low bed, 7-ton, Nike missile
- G-859
  - M527 semitrailer, low bed, 6-ton,
  - M539 semitrailer, chassis,
  - M539E2 semitrailer, van, field maint.
  - M671 semitrailer, van, org. maint.
  - M672 semitrailer, van, field maint.
- G-860
  - M437 truck, cargo, 16-ton, 4×4, Caterpillar
  - M438 truck, fuel tank, 5,000-Gal,
  - M554 truck, wrecker, 20-ton,
- G-861
  - M520 Goer, 8-ton, 4×4 Caterpillar
  - M553 wrecker,
  - M559 tanker, 2,500-Gal.
  - M877 cargo,
- G-863
  - see G-742.
- G-865
  - M555 semitrailer, electronics van, 6-ton,
  - M556 semitrailer, electronics van, 6-ton,
  - M557 semitrailer, electronics van, 10-ton,
  - M558 semitrailer, electronics van, 10-ton,
- G-867
  - M536 trailer, laundry, 1.5-ton
  - M537 trailer, bakery, 2.5-ton
  - M538 trailer, dough mixer,
  - M759 trailer, dough mixer,
- G-868
  - M523 truck, tractor, 25-ton, Kenworth
- G-869
  - M524 semitrailer, low bed, 55-ton, HETT
- G-870
  - M528 dolly, load divider, 35-ton,
- G-871
  - M463 trailer, air conditioner, 1.5-ton,
- G-872
  - M354 dolly, trailer converter, 15-ton,
- G-874
  - M561 Gama Goat
- G-875
  - M417 trailer, cargo, 1-ton,
- G-877
  - M149 trailer, water tank, 400-Gal.
  - M625 trailer, water tank, 400-Gal,
- G-879
  - M571 carrier, utility, articulated, Canadair, Dynatrac,
- G-881
  - M580 trailer, chassis, 1-ton,
  - M581 trailer, electronic van, 1.5-ton,
- G-882
  - M586 trailer, water tank, 2,000-Gal.
  - M796 trailer, bolster, 4-ton,
- G-883
  - semitrailer, van 4-ton
  - M574 semitrailer, electronic van,
  - M654 semitrailer, electronic van, telemeter,
  - M680 semitrailer,
  - M738 semitrailer,
  - M739 semitrailer, switchboard,
  - M823 semitrailer,
  - M824 semitrailer,
- G-884
  - M674 semitrailer, low bed, 15-ton,
  - M682 semitrailer, radar transmitter van,
  - M683 semitrailer, radar control,
  - M684 semitrailer, heat exchanger,
- G-888
  - M131 semitrailer, fuel tank, 5,000-Gal.
- G-889
  - M689 dolly, transportable shelter,
  - M690 dolly, front,
  - M691 dolly, rear,
  - M829 dolly, transportable shelter,
  - M830 dolly, front,
  - M831 dolly, rear,
- G-890
  - Truck, 1 1/4 ton, 4×4 (Kaiser Jeep)
  - Kaiser Jeep M715
  - M724 truck, chassis
  - M725 truck, ambulance,
  - M726 truck, telephone,
- G-891
  - trailer, flat bed, 10-ton,
- G-892
  - trailer, bolster, swivel, 14-ton
- G-893
  - trailer, flat bed, 7-ton,
- G-894
  - trailer, low bed, 60-ton,
- G-895
  - trailer, low bed, 8-ton,
- G-896
  - trailer, bolster,
- G-897
  - trailer, bolster, swivel, 9-ton,
- G-898
  - M720 dolly set, 3-ton, includes 721, and 722
  - M721 dolly front,
  - M722 dolly rear,

== G-900 to end ==
- G-900
  - truck, 2.5-ton, 6×6,
  - M621 truck, cargo
  - M622 truck, fuel tank, 1200-Gal.
  - M623 truck, shop van,
  - M624 truck, dump,
- G-901
  - truck, 2.5-ton, 6×6,
  - M766 truck, chassis
  - M767 truck, chassis
  - M768 truck, chassis
  - M769 truck, chassis
  - M770 truck, cargo
  - M771 truck, cargo
  - M772 truck, cargo
  - M773 truck, cargo
  - M774 truck, cargo
  - M775 truck, cargo
  - M776 truck, tank
  - M777 truck, chassis
  - M778 truck, cargo, dropside
  - M779 truck, tank fuel,
  - M780 truck, water tank, 1000-Gal,
  - M781 truck, shop van,
  - M782 truck, Instrument repair shop,
  - M783 truck, tractor,
  - M784 truck, dump
  - M785 truck, bolster
  - M786 truck, pole construction,
  - M787 truck, telephone maint.
  - M788 truck, auger,
- G-902
  - M627 semitrailer, jointed, 52.5-ton, tank hauler, Ward LaFrance Truck Corporation
  - M793 semitrailer, jointed, 52.5-ton, tank hauler
- G-903
  - M746 truck, tractor, 22.5-ton, tank transporter
- G-904
  - M747 semitrailer, low bed, 52.5-ton, tank transporter, Condec
- G-905
  - M705 truck, cargo, 5/4-ton, 4×4, Chevrolet
  - M737 ambulance, 5/4-ton, 4×4
- G-906
  - M36A2C truck, cargo, 2.5-ton, 6×6
- G-907
  - M789 trailer, flat bed, tilt loading, 6-ton
- G-908
  - M809 truck, chassis, 5-ton, 6×6, A M General
  - M810 truck, chassis (SWB)
  - M811 truck, chassis (XLWB)
  - M812 truck, chassis (XLWB)
  - M813 truck, cargo (14-foot body)
  - M814 truck, cargo (20-foot body)
  - M815 truck bolster
  - M816 truck, wrecker
  - M817 truck, dump
  - M818 truck, tractor
  - M819 truck, tractor, wrecker
  - M820 truck, expansible van
  - M821 truck, stake, (bridge transport)
- G-909
  - dolly set, portable shelter
- G-910-Nothing follows

== See also ==
- List of U.S. Army weapons by supply catalog designation
- List of U.S. Signal Corps Vehicles
- List of U.S. military vehicles by model number
- Federal Stock Number
- NATO Stock Number
- Tank classification

== References, general ==
- Chief of Ordnance Office; Military Vehicle Preservation Association, eds. (2010). Summary Report of Acceptances, Tank-Automotive Materiel, 1940-1945 (Revision). Detroit: U.S. Army Service Forces, Office: Chief of Ordnance-Detroit, Production Division, Requirements and Progress Branch (published December 1945).
- Doyle, David (2003). Standard catalog of U.S. Military Vehicles. Krause Publications. ISBN 0-87349-508-X.
- G503 Military Vehicle Message Forums
- U.S. Govt. Publications, Monthly Catalog no. 582 (July '43) through no. 587 (December '43), Government Printing Office, Superintendent of Documents. Includes alphabetised Index for the whole of 1943.
- Ordnance Publications For Supply Index (OPSI). Washington: War Department, Ordnance Office. 1 July 1943. pp. 68–129. "Introduction to The Ordnance Catalog, Index of Standard Nomenclature Lists, Ordnance Provision System Regulations, Schedules of Stores Reports, Ordnance Storage and Shipment Charts, and Alphabetical Listing of Major Items"
- "Group 'G' Listings.pdf" (PDF). GVRDEU.org. Greater Vancouver Regional District Employees Union.
- ST 9-159 handbook of Ordnance material dated March 1968. (ST- is Special Text)
- TM 9-2800 – Standard Military Motor Vehicles. Washington: U.S. War Department. 1 September 1943.
- TM 9-2800 – MILITARY VEHICLES (PDF). Washington: Department of the Army. 27 October 1947.
- TM 9-2800-1/TO 19-75A-89 – MILITARY VEHICLES (PDF). Washington: Departments of the Army and the Air Force. 13 February 1953.
- WD CAT. ORD 1 Introduction to ordnance catalog
- WD CAT. ORD 2 Index to Ordnance supply catalog
