= List of ground-based radars used by the United States Marine Corps =

This is an incomplete list of ground-based radars operated by the United States Marine Corps since the service first started utilizing radars in 1940. The Marine Corps' has used ground-based radars for anti-aircraft artillery fire control, long range early warning, Ground-controlled interception (GCI), ground directed bombing, counter-battery radar, short-range cueing for man-portable air-defense systems, and fire control for medium range surface-to-air missiles.

== Background ==
Radars were initially used for early warning against enemy aircraft and for rudimentary fire control of anti-aircraft guns. Teey were first fielded to the newly established Defense Battalions and Marine Aircraft Groups containing fighters. Beginning in 1943, Marine Corps aviation commissioned specialized command and control units responsible for training and deploying radars to provide ground-controlled interception, for both day and night fighter operations. Ground based sensors are at the heart of the Marine Corps' current Force Design 2030 strategy because they augment sea-based air defense and command and control capabilities and enhance fleet interoperability.

== Long Range Early Warning ==
A long range/early-warning radar is any radar system used primarily for the long-range detection of its targets, i.e., allowing defenses to be alerted as early as possible before the intruder reaches its target, giving friendly forces the maximum time in which to operate. These radars typically operate at lower frequencies, and thus longer wavelengths, than other types. This greatly reduces their interaction with rain and snow in the air and therefore improves their performance in the long-range role. Today these radars are also used for tracking the high-altitude, exo-atmospheric trajectory ballistic missiles.

Picture	Nomenclature	Fielded to FMF	End of Service	Notes	Ref
	SCR-270	1941	1945	The first operational early-warning radar utilized by the Marine Corps. It was built by Westinghouse and was the primary long-range radar used throughout World War II.	
	AN/TPS-1	1944	1950s	Lightweight portable search radar developed by Bell Labs and the MIT Radiation Laboratory during World War II. It used a cut-down parabolic antenna of the "orange peel" design with an off-axis feed and transmitted in the L-band between 1220 and 1280 megahertz (MHz).	
	AN/TPS-15	1944	Early 1960s	The AN/TPS-15 was a TPS-1D upgraded with the IFF Mark X.	
	AN/CPS-5			L-band early warning and GCI radar system that formed the backbone of US air defense network in the 1950s.	
	AN/TPS-22				
	AN/TPS-34	1963	Early 1970s	The first three-dimensional, dual channel, early-warning radar designed and utilized for the United States Marine Corps. Designed and built by the Sperry Corporation, the radar provided range, bearing, and altitude to the operator for aircraft in its assigned search area.	
	AN/TPS-32	1969	Early 1990s	A mobile, three-dimensional radar produced by ITT Gilfillan which was the primary sensor for the Marine Corps' Tactical Air Operations Center (TAOC). The AN/TPS-32 was optimized to work in concert with the Marine Tactical Data System and the MIM-23 Hawk Missile System.	
	AN/TPS-59	1985	2020	A mobile, L-band, active electronically scanned array (AESA) 3-dimensional air search radar first produced by GE Aerospace. The system offered instrumented detection at ranges on the order of 200 to 250 nautical miles (370 to 460 km; 230 to 290 mi) and had a wide variety of interference and clutter rejection systems.	
	AN/TPS-80	2016	TBD	The G/ATOR Block I is the next-generation Air Surveillance/Air Defense radar. The mobile, active electronically scanned array radar system is developed and produced by Northrop Grumman and is optimized to work in concert with the Common Aviation Command and Control System and the Composite Tracking Network.	

== Gap Fillers ==
Gap filler radars are smaller, more mobile radars that are used to cover gaps in long range radar coverage that arises due to curvature of the earth and geographic interference. They are usually placed in areas where enemy aircraft could fly low to avoid areas covered by long range radar.

Picture	Nomenclature	Fielded to FMF	End of Service	Notes	Ref
	SCR-268	1940	1945	The Marine Corps's first radar system. Introduced in 1940, it was developed to provide accurate aiming information for antiaircraft artillery and was also used for gun laying, directing searchlights against aircraft, and early warning during World War II.	
	SCR-602	1943		Mobile, lightweight, medium-range, early-warning radar utilized during the initial phases of amphibious assaults during World War II.	
	SCR-527			Medium-range radar used by the United States for early warning and ground-controlled interception (GCI) during World War II.	
	SCR-588			The Marine Corps used the SCR-588 as a training radar during World War II. The radar was located on the airfield at MCAS Cherry Point, North Carolina and was utilized with the radar school taught by Marine Air Warning Group 1.	
	SCR-584	1944		Automatic-tracking microwave radar developed by the MIT Radiation Laboratory during World War II. It was one of the most advanced ground-based radars of its era, becoming one of the primary gun laying radars used worldwide well into the 1950s.	
	AN/MPS-11			Mobile version of the D-Band, AN/FPS-8 Medium Search Radar that was designed for aircraft control and early warning. Mainly used during the Korean War and into the early 1960s.	
	AN/UPS-1			2D air surveillance and early warning radar, replaced by AN/TPS-63	
	AN/TPS-63	1978	2018	Medium range, Two-dimensional, L band radar system utilized by the United States Marine Corps from the early 1980s until finally retired in 2018. This mobile radar was developed by Northrop Grumman and complimented the AN/TPS-59 long range radar by providing 360 degree, gap-filling coverage of low altitude areas.	

== Heightfinders ==
A height finder radar is a type of 2-dimensional radar that measures the altitude of a target.

Picture	Nomenclature	Fielded to FMF	End of Service	Notes	Ref
	AN/MPS-4			Vertically mounted X-Band radar first developed and produced near the end of World War II.	
	AN/MPS-16				
	AN/TPS-37				

== Air Traffic Control & Ground Controlled Approach (GCA) radars ==
Ground-controlled approach (GCA) is a type of service provided by air-traffic controllers whereby they guide aircraft to a safe landing, including in adverse weather conditions, based on primary radar images. Most commonly, a GCA uses information from either a precision approach radar (PAR, for precision approaches with vertical glidepath guidance) or an airport surveillance radar (ASR, providing a non-precision surveillance radar approach with no glidepath guidance). The term GCA may refer to any type of ground radar guided approach such as a PAR, PAR without glideslope or ASR.

Picture	Nomenclature	Fielded to FMF	End of Service	Notes	Ref
	AN/MPN-1	1947		Mobile Ground-controlled approach radar first used during World War II.	
	AN/MPN-13				
	AN/MPN-14				
	AN/TPN-8				
	AN/TPN-22			I band, three-dimensional, transportable phased array radar that provides tactical precision approach capabilities.	
	AN/TPS-73			S-band, 2-dimensional surveillance radar w/ 60 nm range up to 40k feet.	
	AN/TPN-31			Expeditionary, highly mobile radar system that provided airspace surveillance and precision approach radar. Also known as the Air Traffic Navigation Integration and Coordination System (ATNAVICS).	

== Counter-Battery radar ==
A counter-battery radar or weapon tracking radar is a radar system that detects artillery projectiles fired by one or more guns, howitzers, mortars or rocket launchers and, from their trajectories, locates the position on the ground of the weapon that fired it.

Picture	Nomenclature	Fielded to FMF	End of Service	Notes	Ref
	AN/MPQ-10				
	AN/MPQ-4			Lightweight, counter-battery radar developed by General Electric, it was primarily used to find the location of enemy mortars and larger artillery.	
	AN/TPQ-36				
	AN/TPS-80	2016		The G/ATOR Block II radar is a mobile, active electronically scanned array counter-battery radar system developed by Northrop Grumman.	

== Course Directed Bombing radars ==
Picture	Nomenclature	Fielded to FMF	End of Service	Notes	Ref
	AN/TPQ-2			Post-World War II radar system for automatically tracking an aircraft and guiding it to a predetermined bomb release point. The system was the predecessor of the General Electric AN/MPQ-14 Course Directing Central deployed to the Korean War for ground-directed bombing.	
	AN/MPQ-14				
	AN/TPQ-10			Lightweight, two-unit, helicopter transportable, ground-based bombing system developed to provide highly accurate, day/night all weather close air support.	

== Ground Based Air Defense radars ==
Picture	Nomenclature	Fielded to FMF	End of Service	Notes	Ref
	AN/MPQ-33/39	1960			
	AN/MPQ-34	1960			
	AN/MPQ-35	1960		Pulse Acquisition Radar (PAR) utilized for high-altitude, long-range search by the MIM-23 Hawk Missile System.	
	AN/MPQ-50			Improved PAR for the Improved-HAWK.	
	AN/MPQ-55			Improved CWAR for the Improved-HAWK.	
	AN/APQ-57			Improved High Power Illuminating Radar for the Improved-HAWK.	
	AN/MPQ-62			Continuous wave acquisition radar (CWAR) provides close-in, low-altitude, two-dimensional radar coverage. The CWAR was typically used with ground-based data link (GBDL) to provide early cueing to LAAD.	
	AN/UPS-3			Short range, 2-dimensional radar utilized for cueing FIM-92 Stinger missile teams and the AN/TWQ-1 Avenger. Also known as the Tactical Defense Alert Radar (TDAR).	

== See also ==
- United States Marine Corps Aviation
- Marine Air Command and Control System
- Joint Electronics Type Designation System
- List of United States Marine Corps aviation support squadrons
- List of military electronics of the United States
