= Ben Hur trailer =

U.S. Army cargo trailer

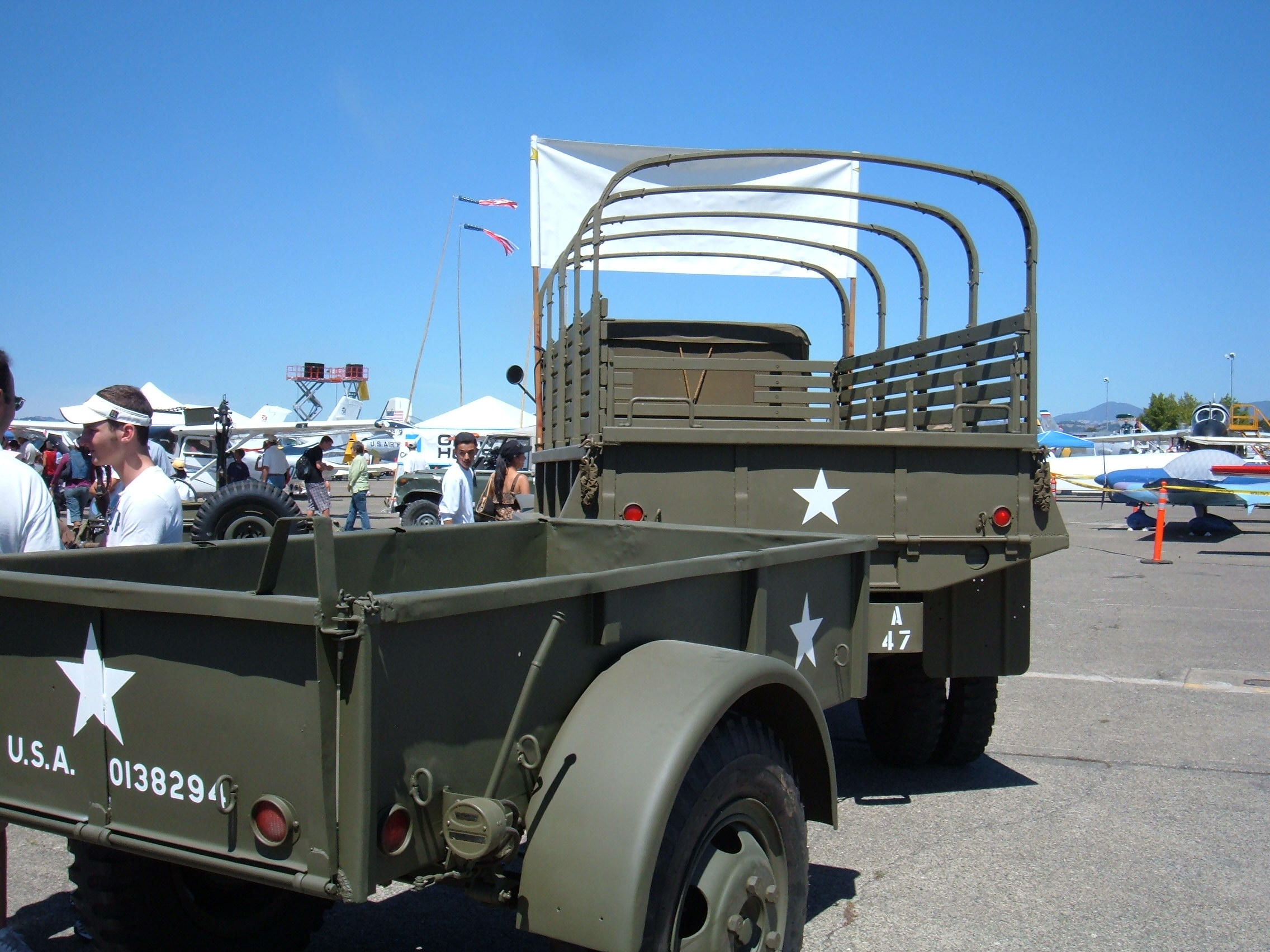
1942 "Ben-Hur" 1-ton trailer

Ben Hur trailer was the nickname of the World War II U.S. Army Trailer, 1-ton payload, 2-wheel, cargo, and the Trailer, 1-ton payload, 2-wheel, water tank, 250 gallon ( U.S. Army Ordnance Corps Supply catalogue designations G-518 and G-527 respectively). (Note: A group number for ordering parts, based on a standard nomenclature list.) Specialized variants were also manufactured.

The one-ton trailers were designed to be towed by vehicles rated 3/4-ton and upwards, like the Dodge WC series trucks, as well as 1 1/2-ton 4x4 trucks, and 2 1/2-ton 6x6 trucks, such as the Chevrolet G506 and the much used GMC CCKW trucks.

The G-518 trailers were among the Allies' most built and used models with a total of 259,064 units made.

== Description ==
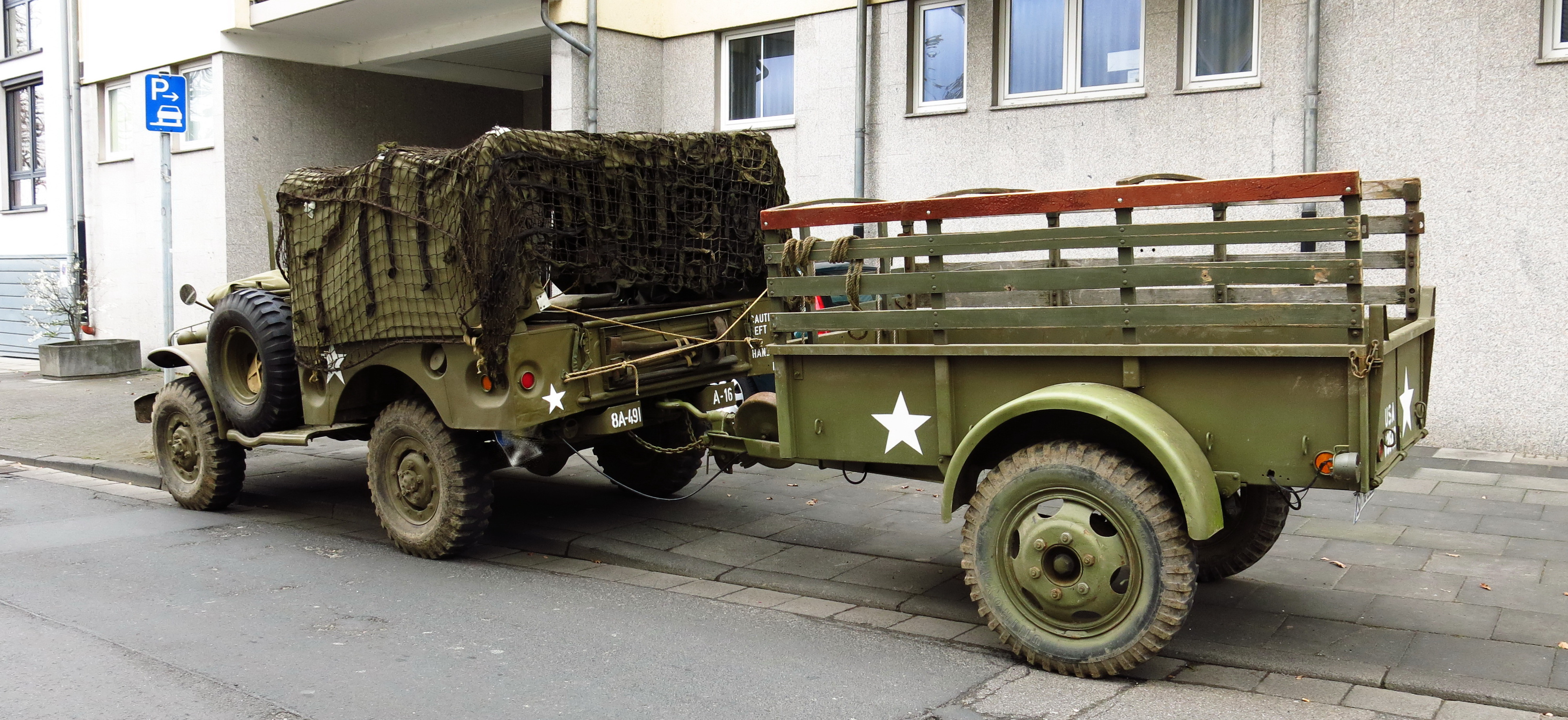
The "Ben Hur" trailer was frequently mated to the Dodge WC series of trucks

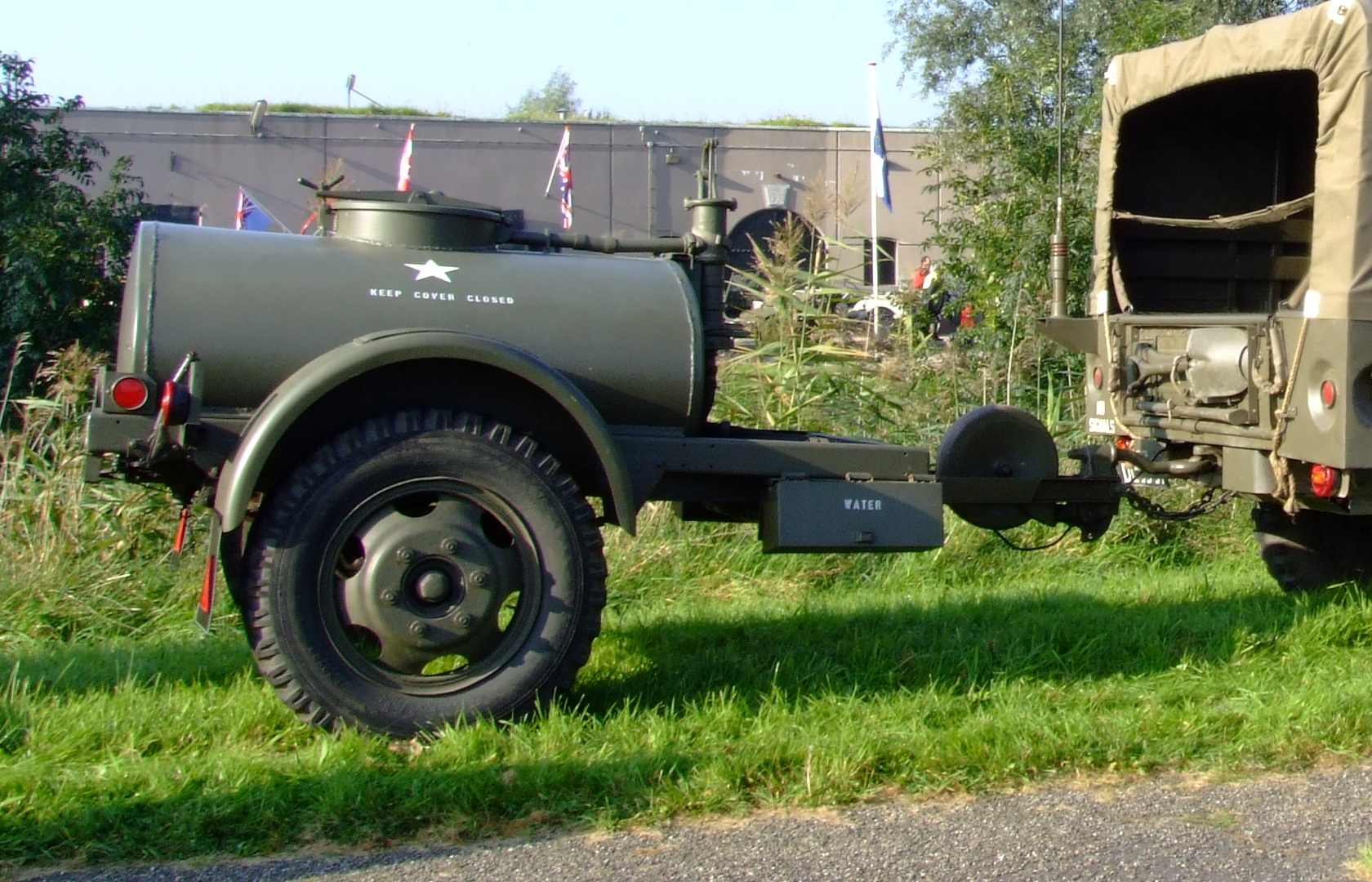
The G-527 watertank version of the Ben hur trailer

The Ben Hur trailer was nicknamed after its major manufacturer, the Ben–Hur Mfg. Co., although there were many other companies that produced it between 1941 and 1945. Its primary purpose was to transport general cargo; the Signal Corps modified it to carry several different generators.

=== Variants ===
- K-52 equipped with a PE-95 generator
- K-63 equipped with a PE-99 generator
- K-63A equipped with a PE-197 generator
- V-15 used for the AN/TPQ-2 radar
- M24 ammunition trailer (used with M15 multiple gun motor carriage, auto 37mm & two .50 BMG)
- M25 A-load carried a 25KW generator for the tire repair truck
- M25 B-load carried spares and fuel for the tire repair truck
- G527 water carrier, nicknamed "water buffalo", 250 US gal (946 L; 208 imp gal) capacity

== Specifications ==
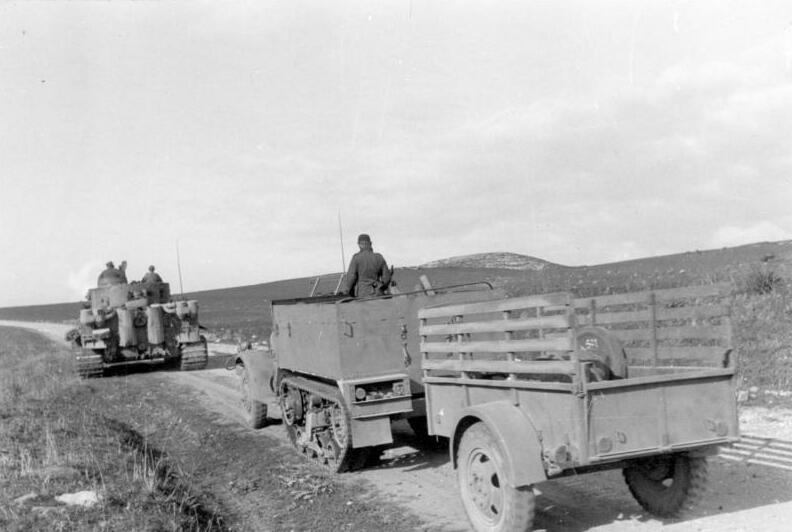
A captured Ben Hur trailer towed by U.S. Army M3 half-track follows a German Tiger Tank in Tunisia early 1943

- Weight (empty): 1,300 lb (590 kg)
- Weight (loaded): 3,300 lb (1,500 kg) off-road; 4,300 lb (2,000 kg) on-road
- Payload: 2,000 lb (910 kg) off-road; 3,000 lb (1,400 kg) on-road
- Cargo volume: 113 cu ft (3.2 m^{3})
- Length: 145 1/2 in (3.70 m)
- Width: 71 1/8 in (1.81 m)
- Height: 73 in (1.9 m) with canvas top
- Axles: 1, with 2 wheels
- Brakes: hand, parking only

== Production ==
G-518 trailers were manufactured by over two dozen companies:

- American Bantam
- Ben Hur Mfg. Co., Milwaukee, Wisconsin
- Century Boat Works
- Checker Motors Corporation
- Covered Wagon Co., Michigan (Note: From 1935-1945, the Covered Wagon Co. was the largest travel trailer manufacturer in the United States.)
- Dorsey Trailer
- Gerstenslager
- Henney Motor Company
- Hercules Body,
- Highland Body & Trailer Mfg. Co, Cincinnati
- Hobbs Trailer & Equipment Inc, (then) Texas
- Hyde,
- Keystone RV,
- Levine Gear Co
- Mifflinburg Body Company, (were in) Pennsylvania
- Naburs,
- Nash-Kelvinator,
- Omaha Standard Body,
- Pke,
- Queen City,
- Redman's Trailers, Connecticut,
- Steel Products,
- Streich,
- Strick Trailers, Indiana,
- Transportation Equipment Corp, Missouri
- Truck Engineering Corporation, Indiana
- Willys Overland,
- Winter Weiss Defense Trailers, Denver, Colorado

== See also ==
- List of U.S. Signal Corps Vehicles

== General references ==
- TM 9-883 1-Ton, 2-Wheel, Cargo and Water Trailers, 1943
- TM 10-1395
- TM 9-2800 Standard Military Motor Vehicles. dated 1 sept. 1943
- TM 9-2800 Military vehicles dated Oct. 1947
- TM 11-227 Signal Communication Directory. dated 10 April 1944
- TM 11-487 Electrical Communication systems Equipment. dated 2 Oct. 1944
