= Ground-controlled approach =

Type of service provided by air-traffic controllers

In aviation, a ground-controlled approach (GCA) is a type of service provided by air-traffic controllers whereby they guide aircraft to a safe landing, including in adverse weather conditions, based on primary radar images. Most commonly, a GCA uses information from either a precision approach radar (PAR, for precision approaches with vertical glidepath guidance) or an airport surveillance radar (ASR, providing a non-precision surveillance radar approach with no glidepath guidance). The term GCA may refer to any type of ground radar guided approach such as a PAR, PAR without glideslope or ASR. An approach using ASR is known as a surveillance approach. When both vertical and horizontal guidance from the PAR is given, the approach is termed a precision approach. If no PAR glidepath is given, even if PAR equipment is used for lateral guidance, it is considered a non-precision approach.

== History ==
=== Early experiments ===
The GCA concept was coinvented by nuclear physicist Luis Alvarez and Lawrence H. Johnston. Originally of the University of California, Berkeley, in 1941 Alvarez was invited to join the recently opened MIT Radiation Laboratory. The "RadLab" had formed to develop radar systems based on the cavity magnetron, revealed to them by its UK inventors during the Tizard Mission in late 1940. By the time Alvarez arrived in Boston, the RadLab had already developed a prototype of a new anti-aircraft radar known as XT-1, which had the ability to automatically track a selected target once "locked-on". Production versions of the XT-1 would begin deliveries in 1944 as the famed SCR-584.

Alvarez was also a light aircraft pilot and was aware of the problems landing aircraft in bad weather. He quickly asked whether the XT-1 could be used for this role; once locked-on to a single aircraft, the radar operator could read the radar displays and give instructions to the pilot to talk them down to a point close to the runway. On 10 November 1941, he was granted time on the XT-1 and successfully measured the position of a landing aircraft with the required accuracy. In the spring of 1942, XT-1 was moved to Elizabeth City, North Carolina, where the landing path extended out over the Pasquotank River estuary. Here the system demonstrated itself incapable of distinguishing between the aircraft and its reflection off the water.

=== New scanners ===
XT-1 was based on the conical scanning concept, which greatly increases the angular accuracy of the radar by rotating the beam around a cone-shaped pattern about 15 degrees across. This caused the beam to periodically sweep across the water when it was pointed near the horizon, which would often be the case as the aircraft approached the ground.

A new methodology was developed in May 1942, combining an S-band airport surveillance radar (ASR) that brought the aircraft into the general area of the airport, and a second X-band radar, the precision approach radar (PAR), with separate antennas for vertical and horizontal guidance that were moved in such a way to avoid seeing the ground.

The first example of the new system, known as Mark I, began testing in November 1942. A further improved version, Mark II, replaced the mechanical scanning antennas with a waveguide "squeeze box" that performed the same scanning without the antennas moving. Mark II also introduced the "expanded-partial-plan-position-indicators", later replaced with the simpler name "beta scan".

=== First orders ===
By the time Mark II was ready, the US Army Air Forces had already widely deployed the SCS-51 instrument landing system (ILS) for this role, and they displayed no interest in the new system. However, in June 1942 the Office of Scientific Research and Development ordered ten examples anyway, giving the contract to Gilfillan Brothers in Los Angeles.

Meanwhile, testing with the Mark I continued. In November 1942 it was moved to Quonset Point Air National Guard Station where Alvarez began shooting approaches using the system. Navy Ensign Bruce Giffin soaped the windshield of his SNB to demonstrate his trust in the system. On 1 January 1943, a Consolidated PBY Catalina had nearly run out of fuel and was forced to land in spite of bad weather. The Mark I operator talked the PBY down into a successful landing, the first "save".

This story caught the attention of the Pentagon, and a demonstration at Washington National Airport was carried out on 14 February 1943. This resulted in an immediate contract from the Army Signal Corps for 57 examples of what they called the MPN-1A from Gilfillan while the US Navy placed a second contract for 80 MPN-IC from Bendix Radio. Several additional orders followed, including an Army order for 200 from ITT.

=== UK interest ===
The UK kept in close contact with their RadLab counterparts, and immediately expressed an interest in the system. The UK had developed their own low-precision approach system based on the Lorenz beam concept, which relied only on a normal audio radio receiver. This system, the Blind Approach Beacon System, provided horizontal guidance only, and was not accurate enough to use for a primary landing system. ILS offered the required accuracy and vertical guidance, but would require new radios and instruments to be added to every aircraft. As GCA also required only a normal radio receiver to operation, it would be much easier to use with the vast bomber fleets.

In June 1943, Mark I was sent to the UK aboard battleship HMS Queen Elizabeth and emplaced at RAF Elsham Wolds for testing. Over the next months, over 270 approaches were carried out, including the return of 21 Avro Lancasters on an operational mission on the night of 23 August. This led to a Lend-Lease request for a GCA radar for every RAF Bomber Command airfield. This order helped cement US interest in the system, and they agreed to leave the prototype in the UK.

=== Deliveries and post-war use ===
The first examples of the production AN/MPN-1A were delivered to the Army in the fall of 1944. The first operational unit was placed in Verdun in December. Units were soon delivered to the Pacific, installed at Iwo Jima. By the end of the war, most airfields in Europe and the Pacific had one.

In early 1946, three surplus MPN- 1 were given to the Civil Aeronautics Board and placed at Washington-National Airport, LaGuardia Airport, and Chicago-Midway. This led to further orders for more highly developed versions of both the ASR and PAR systems.

== Overview ==
Ground-controlled approach is the oldest air traffic technique to fully implement radar to service a plane. The system was simple, direct, and worked well, even with previously untrained pilots. It requires close communication between ground-based air traffic controllers and pilots in approaching aircraft. Only one pilot is guided at a time (max. 2 under certain circumstances). The controllers monitor dedicated precision approach radar systems, to determine the precise course and altitude of approaching aircraft. The controllers then provide verbal instructions by radio to the pilots to guide them to a landing. The instructions include both descent rate (glidepath) and heading (course) corrections necessary to follow the correct approach path.

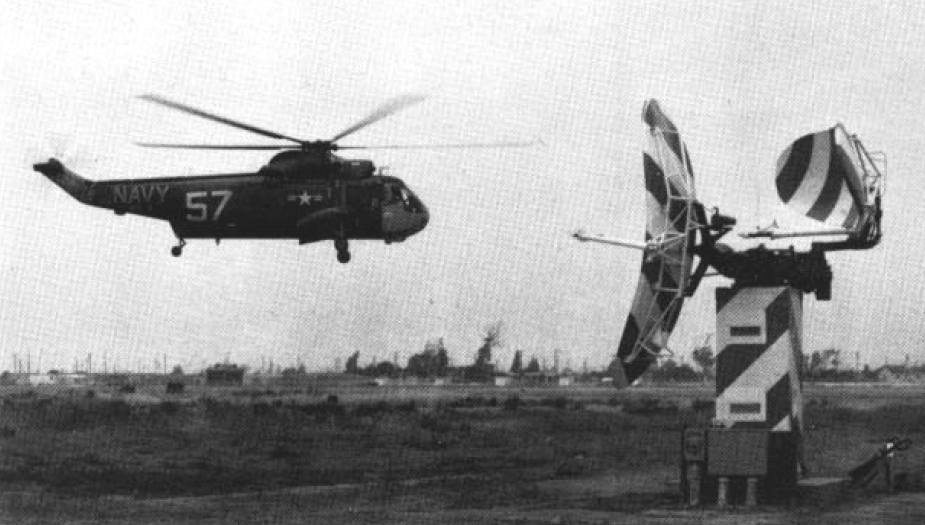
A U.S. Navy Sea King makes a ground-controlled approach, 1964.

Two tracks are displayed on the Precision Approach Radar (PAR) scope:

- Azimuth, showing the aircraft's position relative to the horizontal approach path.
- Elevation, showing vertical position relative to the published glidepath.

By following controller commands to keep the landing aircraft on both glidepath and approach centerline, a pilot will arrive precisely over the runway's touchdown zone. In order to insure continuous radio communication integrity, controllers are required to make radio transmissions at certain minimum intervals depending on the type of approach flow and phase of the approach. In order to land, pilots must have the runway or runway environment in sight prior to reaching the "decision height," for PAR approaches (usually 100–400 ft above the runway touchdown zone) or prior to the "Missed Approach Point" for non-precision approaches. The published minimum visibility and decision height/minimum descent altitude vary depending upon the approach and runway lighting, obstacles in the approach corridor, type of aircraft, and other factors. Pilots of revenue flights periodically must demonstrate PAR approach proficiency, and GCA controllers must conduct a minimum number of such approaches in a year to maintain competency.

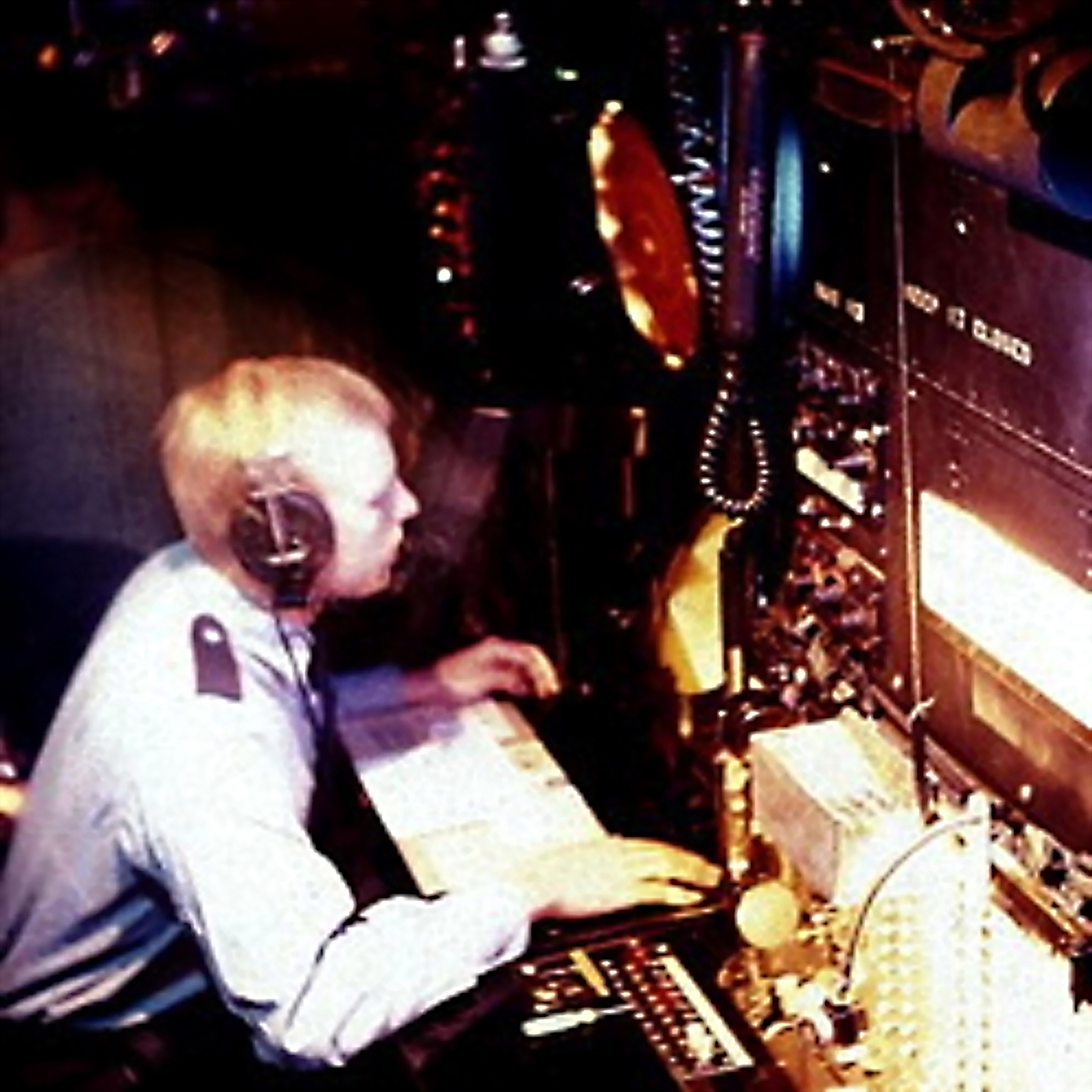
ATC P. Riemann at the PAR inside the "Fursty" GCA-unit (1966)

Because of their labor-intensive nature—one GCA controller is normally required for each aircraft on final approach—GCAs are no longer in widespread use at civilian airports, and are being discontinued at many military bases. However, air traffic controllers at some locations in the United States are required to maintain currency in their use, while the Belgian Air Force still uses the PAR for ground-controlled approaches on a daily basis. NATO has kept GCA active while civil aviation adopted the instrument landing system (ILS). Global Positioning System (GPS) based approaches that provide both lateral and vertical guidance are coming into widespread use, with approach minima as good as, or nearly as good as, GCA or ILS. Modern ILS and GPS approaches eliminate the possibility of human error from the controller, and can serve many aircraft at the same time. The ground-controlled approach is useful when the approaching aircraft is not equipped with sophisticated navigation aids, and may also become a life saver when an aircraft's on-board navigation aids are inoperative, as long as one communication radio works. Sometimes the PAR-based ground-controlled approach is also requested by qualified pilots when they are dealing with an emergency on board to lighten their workload. In the United States, instrument approaches must be monitored by a PAR (if one exists with a coinciding final approach course) during certain condition such as times of darkness or low weather depending upon the controlling agency (USAF, U.S. Army, USN or FAA) or upon pilot request.

Ground-controlled approaches have been depicted in several films, including Strategic Air Command, The Big Lift, Airport, Julie, and Skyjacked.

Arthur C. Clarke's novel Glide Path fictionalizes the original development of GCA.

Clarke contributed to the early application of GCA. GCA was developed during World War II to enable pilots returning to base to land safely when visibility was poor. It was essential for maintaining the flow of supplies during the Berlin airlift in 1948–49.

== See also ==
- Beam Approach Beacon System
- TLS – Transponder Landing System
- AN/MPN
- Index of aviation articles
