= K-84 =

K-84 refers to

- Russian submarine K-84 Ekaterinburg
- K-84 trailer
- K-84 Commuter
- British corvette HMS Hyacinth (K84)
- K-84 (Kansas highway)
