= List of U.S. Signal Corps vehicles =

This is a list of vehicles used by the U.S. Army Signal Corps from World War I through World War II.

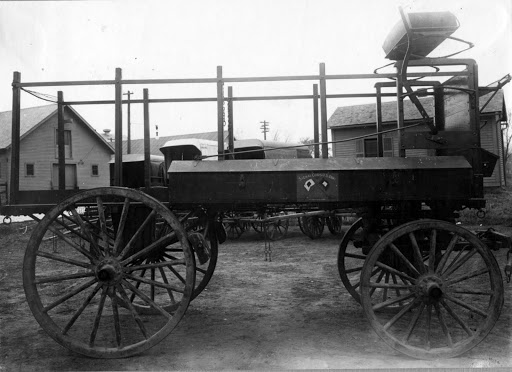
An empty Lance wagon, possibly the K-2 used to carry "Lance" poles for telephone/telegraph wire

== Designations ==
Vehicles specifically designed or adapted for the Signal Corps were initially designated by a "K" number. The K-number was later phased out along with the Signal Corps Radio nomenclature system, and was replaced by a "V" number under the Joint Electronics Type Designation System (JETDS).

=== K numbers ===
K-number	Tonnage	Drive	Manufacturer	Type	Used with	Associated with
K-1 cart	unknown	1 axle	unknown	wire		Telephone
K-2 truck	unknown	2 axle	unknown	lance wagon		Telephone
K-3 cart	unknown	1 axle	Holms Auto Co.	wire caisson	K-4	Telephone
K-4 cart	unknown	1 axle	Holms Auto Co.	signal caisson	K-3	Telephone
K-5 truck	unknown	4x2	unknown	maintenance		Radio Tractor
K-6 unknown						
K-7 unknown						
K-8 cart	unknown	1 axle	unknown	signal		Telephone
K-9 unknown						
K-10 unknown						
K-11 wagon	unknown	1 axle	unknown	gas cylinder caisson		Balloons
K-12 unknown						
K-13 trailer	unknown	unk.	unknown	storage battery		
K-14 trailer	unknown	unk.	unknown	radio		
K-15 unknown	unknown	unk.	unknown			
K-16 unknown	unknown	unk.	unknown			
K-17 unknown	unknown	unk.	unknown			
K-18 truck	1.5 ton	4x2	General Motors	COE/van	K-19	SCR-197
K-19 trailer	1 ton	1 axle	A. J. Miller	21' house	K-18	SCR-197
K-20 trailer						SCR-250
K-21 unknown						
K-22 trailer	4 ton	1 axle	Kingham Trailer Co.	turntable	K-32	SCR-270
K-23 unknown						
K-28 trailer	4 ton	2 axle	Fruehauf Corporation.	turntable	K-56	SCR-268
K-29 trailer	3 ton	1 axle	Adam Black and Sons	box		SCR-277
K-30 truck	5 ton	4x4	Autocar Company	van operating		SCR-270
K-31 truck	5 ton	4x4	Autocar Company	van power	PE-74	SCR-270
K-32 truck	5 ton	4x4	Autocar Company	prime mover	K-22	SCR-270
K-33 truck	1.5 ton	4x4	General Motors	stake bed	antenna hauler	SCR-270
K-34 trailer	5 ton	2 axle	A. J. Miller	power	PE-84	SCR-268
K-35 trailer	1.5 ton	2 axle	Checker Motors Company	house	SCS-2	SCR-562
K-36 trailer	2 ton	1 axle	American Trailer, Highway Trailer Company	pole dinky	K-42	telephone
K-37 trailer	5 ton	1 axle	highway	pole/reel	k-42	telephone
K-38 trailer	1/4 ton	1 axle	York	splicers TE-56	k-50	telephone
K-39 trailer	4 ton	2 axle	unknown	unknown		
K-40 trailer	4 ton	2 axle	unknown	unknown		
K-41 trailer	4 ton	2 axle	unknown	mobile meteorological station		Signal Corps Radio
K-42 truck	1.5 ton	4x4	Chevrolet	telephone maintenance	no winch	telephone
K-43 truck	1.5 ton	4x4	Chevrolet	telephone maintenance	with winch	telephone
K-44 truck	1.5 ton	4x4	Chevrolet	auger with winch	K-42/43	telephone
K-45 trailer	1.5 ton	1 axle	unknown	photographic		photo.
K-49 trailer	4 ton	2 axle	unknown	unknown		
K-50 truck	1/2 ton 3/4 ton	4x4	Chevrolet & Dodge	slant box		telephone
K-50B truck	3/4 ton	4x4	Dodge WC-61	square box		telephone
K-51 truck	1.5 ton	4x4	Chevrolet G506	panel van	K-52	SCR-299
K-52 trailer	1 ton	1 axle	Ben Hur trailer	power	PE-95	SCR-299, SCR-399
K-53 truck	2.5 ton	6x6	GMC CCKW	van multi purpose		
K-54 truck	1.5 ton	4x4	Chevrolet G506	stake bed	antenna hauler	SCR-270
K-55 trailer	1.5 ton	2 axle	A. J. Miller	21' house	fighter intercept	AN/TTQ-1
K-56 truck	6 ton	6x6	White Motor Company	24' van		SCR-268, SCR-545
K-57 truck	2.5 ton	6x6	GMC CCKW	van		
K-58 trailer	4 ton	2 axle	Fruehauf Corporation	Turntable		SCR-268
K-59 truck	2.5 ton	6x6	GMC CCKW	van Antenna		
K-60 truck	2.5 ton	6x6	GMC CCKW	van multi purpose		
K-61 truck	2.5 ton	6x6	GMC CCKW			
K-62 truck	5/6 ton	6x6	Autocar Company	van same as K-30/31		SCR-270
K-63 trailer	1 ton	1 axle	Ben Hur	power		
K-63A trailer	1 ton	1 axle	Ben Hur	power		
K-64 trailer	4 ton	1 axle	Couse	turntable	30' AN-130	SCR-270
K-65 trailer	1.5 ton	2 axle	Checker Motors Company	house	K-35	SCR-270
K-66 unknown						
K-67 trailer	6 ton	1 axle	Fruehauf Corporation	turntable	K-73	SCR-547
K-68 trailer	7-ton	2 axle	Fruehauf Corporation	turntable		SCR-268
K-69 unknown						
K-70 truck	1.5 ton	4x4	Chevrolet	panel van		
K-71 trailer	4 ton	1 axle	Kingham	turntable		SCR-270
K-72 trailer	7 ton	2 axle	A. J. Miller	house		SCR-527
K-73 truck	1.5 ton	4x4	General Motors	prime mover	K-67	SCR-547
K-74 unknown						
K-75 trailer	14 ton	2 axle	Kingham Trailer Co.	cab/antenna	K-56	SCR-545
K-76 trailer	5 ton	2 axle	Fruehauf Corporation	turntable receiver	K-60	SCR-527
K-77 trailer	5 ton	2 axle	Fruehauf Corporation	turntable transmitter	K-60	SCR-527, SCR-545
K-78 trailer	12 ton	1 axle	Fruehauf Corporation	semi antenna		SCR-584
K-79 trailer	5 ton	unknown	unknown	radar antenna		AN/MPS-9
K-80 trailer	unknown	unknown	unknown	power		
K-81 trailer	unknown	unknown	Fruehauf Corporation	antenna mount		
K-82 unknown						
K-83 dolly	1.5 ton	1 axle	General Electric	adapter	K-78	SCR-584
K-84 trailer	7 ton	2 axle	Fruehauf Corporation	amphibious		SCR-784

=== V numbers ===
- JETDS was adopted 16 February 1943

V-number	tonnage	drive	manufacturer.	type	used with	publication	associated with
V-1 trailer	1-ton	1 axle	unknown	antenna mount	PE-141		AN/CRN-2
V-2 trailer		2 axle		(K-34 trailer) van		TM 11-1343	AN/MPN-1
V-3 trailer		1 axle					AN/CPN-7
V-4 trailer		2 axle		(K-34 trailer) van			AN/MPN-1A
V-5 trailer	12-ton	2 axle	Adam Black & sons	van		SNL G724	AN/MPN-1B
V-6 trailer	2-ton	1 axle		localizer			AN/CRN-10
V-7 trailer		2 axle		(K-34 trailer) van			AN/MPN-1C
V-8 truck	4-ton	6X6	Diamond T	968 truck/prime mover	two PE127	SNL G509	AN/MPN-1
V-9 trailer	15-ton	2 axle	Fruehauf Corporation	van		SNL G713	AN/MPG-1
V-10 truck	4-ton	6X6	Diamond T	prime mover	two PE127	SNL G509	AN/MPN-1A
V-11 truck	4-ton	6X6	Diamond T	prime mover	two PE127	SNL G509	AN/MPN-1B
V-12 truck	5-6-ton	4X4	Autocar	(K-30 truck/van)	maintenance	SNL G511	AN/MPN-1
V-13 trailer	3.5-ton	1 axle		pole hauler		SNL G782	telephone
V-14 trailer		2 axle					AN/TPS-1
V-15 trailer	1-ton	1 axle	Superior coach	antenna mount		SNL G518	AN/TPQ-2
V-16 trailer	unknown			IFF			AN/MPX-2
V-17A truck	2.5-ton	6X6	GMCREO Motor Car Company	pole derrick (CCKW)pole derrick (M44)		SNL G742	telephone
V-18A truck	2.5-ton	6X6	GMCREO Motor Car Company	auger (CCKW)auger (M44)		SNL G742	telephone
V-19 trailer							
V-20 truck							
V-21 trailer							AN/TPQ-4
V-22 trailer				power	PU-133		AN/GPN-2
V-26 trailer							AN/MSG-1
V-31 trailer							AN/FPN-1A
V-32 trailer							AN/MPS-4
V-33 truck							AN/MPS-4
V-35 truck	1/4-ton	4X4	Jeep CJ	radio	(marines)		any vehicle mounted radio
V-38 trailer		1-axle					AN/MSQ-1
V-41 truck	3/4-ton	4X4	Dodge	Telephone Maintenance		SNL G741	telephone
V-42 trailer		1 axle					AN/MPN-5
V-43 trailer		1 axle					AN/MPN-5
V-44 trailer		1 axle					AN/MPN-5
V-45 dolly		1 axle					AN/MPN-5
V-46 truck		4X4		prime mover			AN/MPN-5
V-53 trailer	10-ton	2-axle					AN/GPN
V-54 trailer	10-ton	2-axle					AN/GPN
V-55 trailer				operation van			AN/MTQ-1
V-61 cart				dolly for an/fps-8			AN/MPS-11
V-62 trailer				antenna mount			AN/MPQ-10A
V-63 trailer				antenna mount			AN/MPS-7
V-65 trailer				antenna mount			AN/MPS-14
V-66 trailer				transmitter/modulator			AN/MPS-14
V-67 trailer				outrigger transporter			AN/MPS-14
V-71 trailer		2-axle		antenna mount			AN/GPN-6
V-75 trailer		2-axle		antenna mount			AN/MPS-8
V-79 trailer		1-axle		operations			AN/MTQ-1
V-83 trailer		1-axle		operations			AN/MRC-41
V-96 trailer				operations			AN/MPN-11
V-97 trailer				power			AN/MPN-11
V-112 trailer		2-axle		transmitter van			AN/MPS-11
V-113 trailer		2-axle		power distribution van			AN/MPS-11
V-120 trailer		1 axle		cable reel			telephone
V-121 trailer				power			AN/MPN-11
V-126 truck	3/4-ton	4X4	Dodge	Antenna mount		SNL G741	AN/MPX-7
V-130 trailer		2-axle					AN/MPQ-4
V-189 trailer	3-ton	2-axle		operations center		SNL-G833	AN/MSC-25
V-197 trailer		2-axle					AN/MRC-115
V-221 trailer		2-axle		operations center			AN/MCC-12
V-271 trailer		2-axle					AN/TRC-87
V-280 trailer		2-axle		maintenance			AN/MSQ-35
V-287 trailer		2-axle		antenna hauler			AN/MSQ-35
V-317 trailer		2-axle		TTY operations center			AN/MGC-31
V-398 trailer		2-axle		electric repair			AN/MSA-34
V-415 trailer	1/4-ton	1-axle	electromagnetic Ind. Inc.	radio			AN/MRC-127
V-434 cart				push cart	test equipment	TM-11-6625-1668-12	AN/GGM-15
V-452 truck	2.5-ton	6X6		M109 van	IBM punch card	TM-11-7440-278-14	AN/MYK-8
V-460 truck	2.5-ton	6X6		M109 van	IBM punch card	TM-11-7440-278-14	AN/MYK-8
V-474 dolly				pod carrier			AN/ALM-153
V-483 truck	2.5-ton	6X6		M109 van	IBM punch card	TM-11-7440-278-14	AN/MYK-8
V-485 dolly		2-axle		test equipment			AN/ALM-166A
V-487 trailer		2-axle		antenna hauler	C-band		AN/MPS-T1
V-488 trailer		2-axle		antenna hauler	S-band		AN/MPS-T1
V-489 trailer		2-axle		antenna hauler	C-band		AN/MPS-T1
V-490 trailer		2-axle		antenna hauler	C-band		AN/MPS-T1
V-491 trailer		2-axle		antenna hauler	L-band		AN/MPS-T1
V-492 trailer		2-axle		antenna hauler	S-band		AN/MPS-T1
V-493 trailer		2-axle		antenna hauler	S-band		AN/MPS-T1
V-494 trailer		2-axle		antenna hauler	X-band		AN/MPS-T1
V-498 trailer	1/4-ton	1-axle		(M569) central office		SNL-G857	AN/TTC-41
V-499 trailer		2-axle		electronic repair		TM 11-4940-476-24	AN/ALM-153
V-516 trailer		2-axle		test facility			AN/MSM
V-521 trailer		2-axle		data processing			AN/MYQ-4
V-528 trailer		2-axle		central office			AN/TTC-39
V-600 trailer		2-axle		transportable shelter			AN/USD-9

== See also ==
- Signal Corps Radio
- List of military vehicles of World War II
- List of U.S. military vehicles by supply catalog designation
- List of U.S. military vehicles by model number
- List of military electronics of the United States
