= Lee Davenport =

American physicist (1915-2011)

Lee L. Davenport
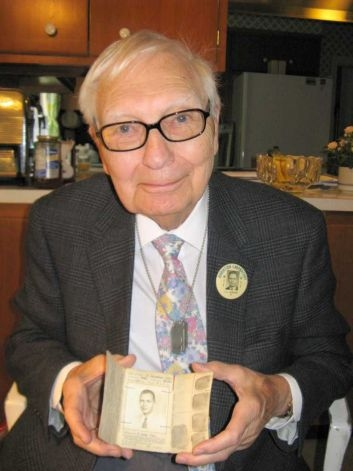
- Born: December 31, 1915; Schenectady, New York
- Died: September 30, 2011 (aged 95); Greenwich, Connecticut, United States
- Citizenship: United States
- Education: University of Pittsburgh
- Known for: SCR-584 radar
- Awards: Election to the National Academy of Engineering
- Scientific career
- Fields: Physics
- Workplaces: MIT, Radiation Laboratory, Harvard University, Radcliffe College, Perkin-Elmer Corporation, GTE Labs

Lee L. Davenport (December 31, 1915 – September 30, 2011) was an American physicist. He was a member of the MIT Radiation Laboratory during World War II, responsible for the development and deployment of the SCR-584 radar system.

== Early life ==
Lee Losee Davenport was born on December 31, 1915, in Schenectady, New York. His father, Harry, was a high school mathematics teacher. Davenport showed an early interest in electrical devices, building electric motors out of papers clips and copper wire.

== Pre-War ==
Davenport received his bachelor's degree from Union College (Schenectady) in 1937, and a master's degree in physics from the University of Pittsburgh in 1940. He was a twenty-five-year-old graduate student working towards his Ph.D. at the University of Pittsburgh when he was invited to join the Radiation Laboratory.

== WW-II ==
While at the Radiation Laboratory, Davenport was placed in charge of the SCR-584 program by physicist and laboratory deputy, Ivan Getting. The SCR-584 radar (Signal Corp Radio #584), a land-mobile radar that was designed to automatically direct anti-aircraft guns, was a major accomplishment of the Radiation Laboratory. It was the SCR-584 that enabled the shooting-down of about 85 percent of V-1 "buzz bombs" attacking London.

Davenport, as a research fellow at the Radiation Laboratory in charge of SCR-584 development from 1941 through the end of World War II, worked with General Electric, Westinghouse and Bell Laboratories to produce more than 3,000 SCR-584 radar sets for the war effort.

The SCR-584 was technically superb, but it required experienced operators. Davenport discovered this to be a problem when he traveled to England to find that some gun crews did not know how to operate the radar. At one site, American soldiers were reading the radar manuals while buzz bombs flew overhead.

Davenport, interviewed by Robert Buderi for his 1996 book, "The Invention That Changed the World: How a Small Group of Radar Pioneers Won the Second World War and Launched a Technological Revolution," recalled that "Seven or eight buzz bombs came within range while I was there... and the crew never got a single shot off at any one of them."

Davenport was again in England two months before D-Day to waterproof the thirty-nine SCR-584 trailers destined to be put ashore at Normandy Beach to direct anti-aircraft fire. Davenport was one of the few people who knew the date of the planned D-Day invasion.

Shortly after D-Day, Davenport found himself five miles behind the front lines, testing SCR-584 capability. He carried papers that identified him as a captain in the Signal Corps in the event that he were captured. SCR-584 radar sets were used also in the Pacific for the retaking of the Philippines.

== Post-war ==
After the war, Davenport completed his Ph.D. in physics in 1946 at the University of Pittsburgh. His dissertation was on the design of a radar-controlled missile, which was effectively the first guided missile. He went on to Harvard University from 1946-1950 to lead construction of the second-largest (92-inch) cyclotron and to teach physics at Radcliffe College.

After Harvard, Davenport became chief engineer for the B-47 bombsight at Perkin-Elmer Corporation (Stamford, CT). This bombsight incorporated an analog computer. He became executive director of Perkin-Elmer, and then vice-president, director and chief engineer of Sylvania Corporation. He was named president of GTE Labs in 1962.

Davenport survived a plane crash on July 2, 1963, and he gave congressional testimony about improving seat belt safety in airplanes.

== Honors ==
Davenport was a member of the American Physical Society, and he was elected to membership in the National Academy of Engineering in 1973, cited for "original contributions to the development of radar, infrared analytical instrumentation, and leadership in development of communications technology."

== See also ==
- SCR-584 radar
