= K-50 truck =

K-50 telephone repair truck
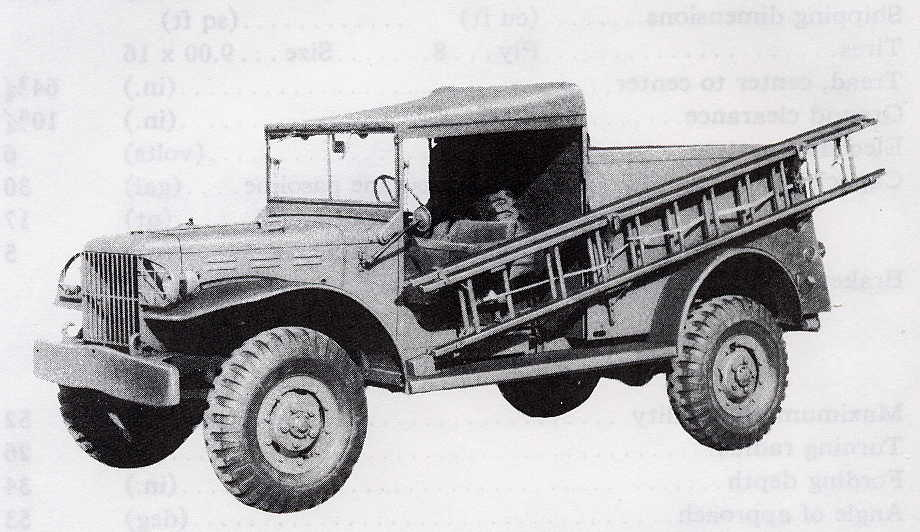
- WC-59, 3/4-ton K-50 phone truck with ladder on side
- Type: telephone repair
- Place of origin: United States

Specifications
- Mass: gross 4,150 Lbs.
- Length: 192-inches
- Width: 71-inches
- Height: 75-inches
- Crew: 2
- Armor: none
- Main armament: none
- Engine: GMC: 6-cylinder 216 cid 85.5 hp
- Suspension: wheels, 4x2 / 4x4
- Maximum speed: 60 MPH

The K-50 telephone repair trucks were used by the U.S. Army Signal Corps, during and after World War II, for the installation and repair of hard telephone lines, primarily in territories liberated from Nazi Germany by the Allied forces.

== History ==
The Signal Corps, at the beginning of World War II needed a light telephone repair truck, and contracted initially with GMC-Chevrolet, and later with Dodge / Fargo, for truck chassis to mount a standard American Telephone & Telegraph tool box bed. The original bed was styled after the Streamline Moderne motif of the 1930s. The second style bed, the K-50B, was a more utilitarian square box, that mounted the ladder on the top rather than on the side. It was often used in conjunction with the K-38 trailer. All were eventually replaced by the Dodge M37 series V-41 trucks.

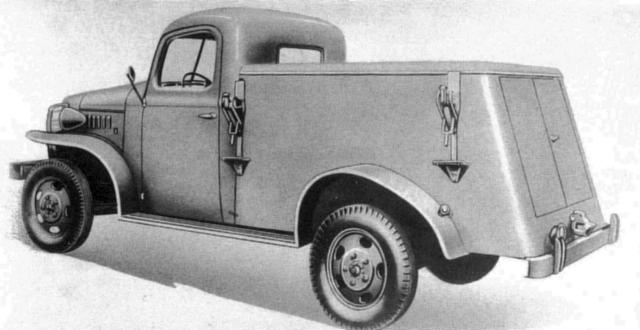
Half-ton Dodge K-50 truck (1942)

The initial trucks were 1/2-ton, rear-wheel driven GMC-Chevrolet units, supplied under two contracts, in 1940 and 1941 respectively. All later K-50 and K-50B trucks were 1/2-ton and 3/4-ton units, contracted from Dodge / Fargo, from 1941 until war's end. Except for two initial rear-wheel drive evaluation units, all Dodges contracted were four-wheel drive.

== Versions ==
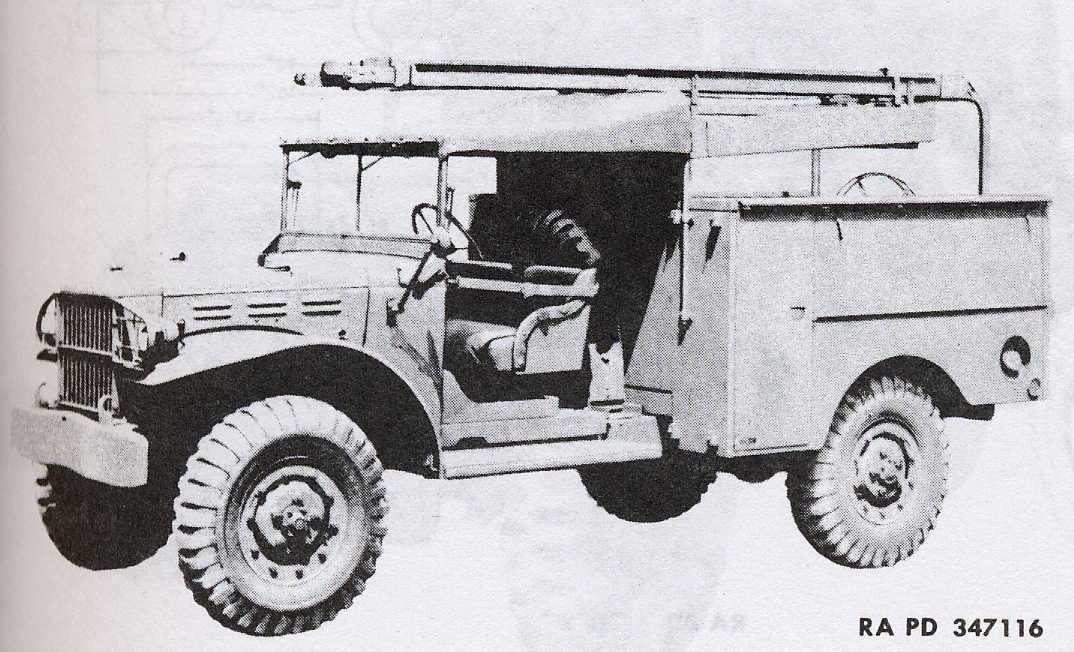
Dodge K-50-B telephone truck with ladder on top.

- GMC-Chevrolet 1/2-ton, 4x2, (1940 & 1941)
  - 33 units in 1940 and 49 units in 1941 amounted to a total of 82 trucks.
- Dodge 1/2-ton, mostly 4x4, (1941), boxes by Highway Trailer Co., Edgerton, Wisconsin
  - WC-39, T112, 4x2 – 1 built
  - WC-43, T215, 4x4 – 370 units built
  - WC-50, T112, 4x2 – 1 built
- Dodge 3/4-ton 4x4
  - WC-59, T214, 4x4 – 549 built, box by Highway Trailer Co.
  - WC-61, T214, K-50B, 4x4 – 58 built; box by American Coach and Body Co., Cleveland, Ohio

== See also ==
- Dodge WC series
- Autocar K-30 and K-31 Signal Corps trucks
- List of U.S. Signal Corps vehicles

== General references ==
- TM 9-2800 Standard Military Motor Vehicles. dated 1 sept. 1943: https://www.scribd.com/doc/140198120/TM-9-2800-1943-STANDARD-MILITARY-MOTOR-VEHICLES-1-SEPTEMBER-1943
- TM 9-2800 Military vehicles dated Oct. 1947: https://www.scribd.com/doc/188375301/TM-9-2800-1947
- TM 9-2800-1 Military vehicles dated February 1953: https://www.scribd.com/doc/183017787/TM-9-2800-1-1953-INCLUDING-C1-EN-C2-pdf
- TM 9-808: https://www.scribd.com/doc/153243048/TM9-808-DODGE-3-4-TON-4-X-4-TRUCK
- SNL G657 Master Parts Book Dec. 1943
