= Precision approach radar =

Type of radar guidance system

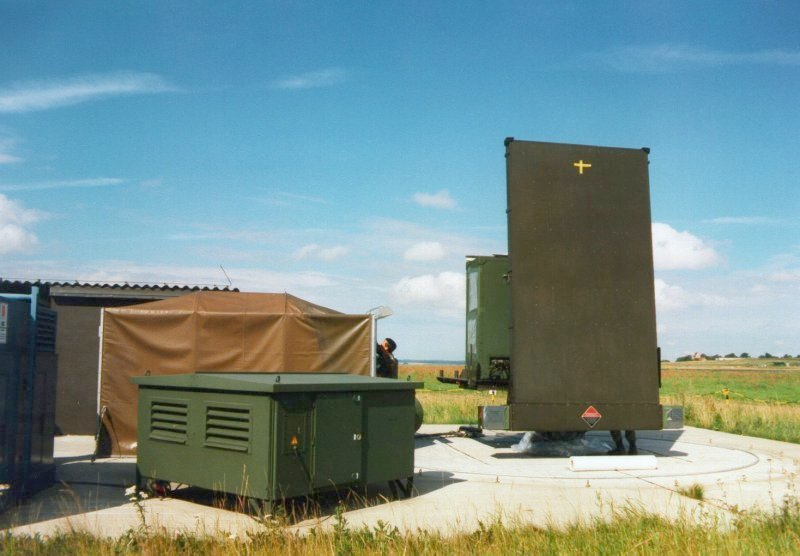
Precision approach radar PAR-80 on a military airfield in Germany

Precision approach radar or PAR is a type of radar guidance system designed to provide lateral and vertical guidance to an aircraft pilot for landing, until the landing threshold is reached. Controllers monitoring the PAR displays observe each aircraft's position and issue instructions to the pilot that keep the aircraft on course and glidepath during final approach. After the aircraft reaches the decision height (DH) or decision altitude (DA), further guidance is advisory only. The overall concept is known as ground-controlled approach (GCA), and this name was also used to refer to the radar systems in the early days of its development.

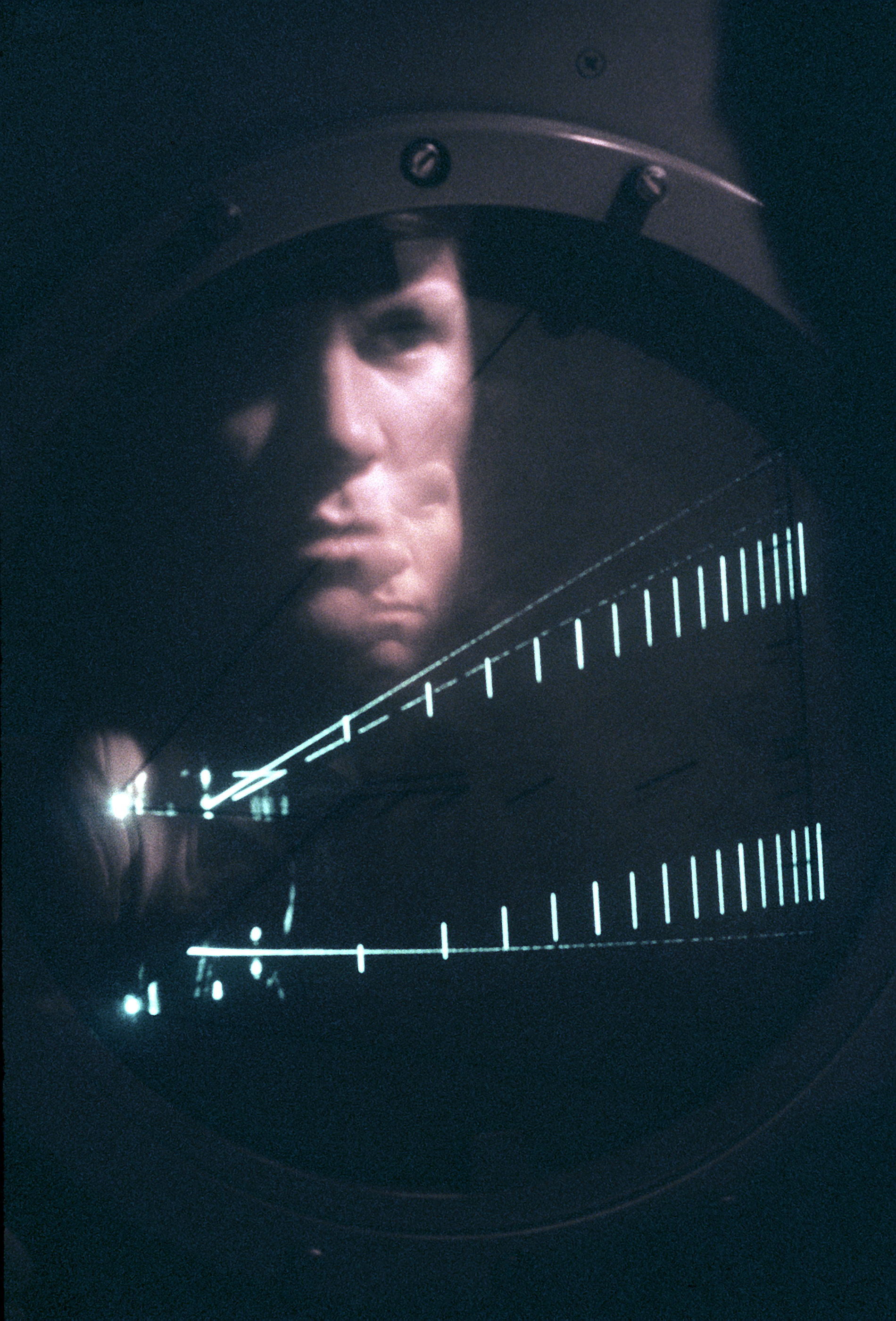
An Air Force air traffic controller is reflected in the precision approach radar scope (1980)

PAR radars use a unique type of radar display with two separate "traces", separated vertically. The upper trace shows the elevation of a selected aircraft compared to a line displaying the ideal glideslope, while the lower shows the aircraft's horizontal position relative to the runway midline. GCA approaches normally start with the controller relaying instructions to bring the aircraft into the glidepath and then begin any corrections needed to bring it onto the centerline.

Precision approach radars are most frequently used at military air traffic control facilities. Many of these facilities use the AN/FPN-63, AN/MPN, or AN/TPN-22. These radars can provide precision guidance from a distance of 10 to 20 miles down to the runway threshold. PAR is mostly used by the Navy, as it does not broadcast directional signals which might be used by an enemy to locate an aircraft carrier.

== Non-traditional PAR using SSR transponder reply ==
There are systems that provide PAR functionality without using primary radar. These non-traditional PAR systems use transponder multilateration, triangulation and/or trilateration.

One such system, Transponder Landing System (TLS) precisely tracks aircraft using the mode 3/A transponder response received by antenna arrays located near the runway. These antennas are part of a measurement subsystem that is used to precisely determine the aircraft 3-dimensional position using TOA, DTOA and AOA measurement techniques. The aircraft position is then displayed on a high-resolution color graphics terminal that also shows the approach centerline and the glide path. A GCA controller is then able to use this screen for reference to issue GCA instructions to the pilot.

The signal strength for the secondary surveillance radar subsystem of a non-traditional PAR is not attenuated by rain since the frequency is within the long range band, L-band. Therefore, a non-traditional PAR does not experience noticeable rain fade and in the case of the TLS has an operational range of 60 nm.

This system is co-operative depending, it means that in the case of transponder failure no aircraft detection will be provided.

== Flight inspection of the PAR ==
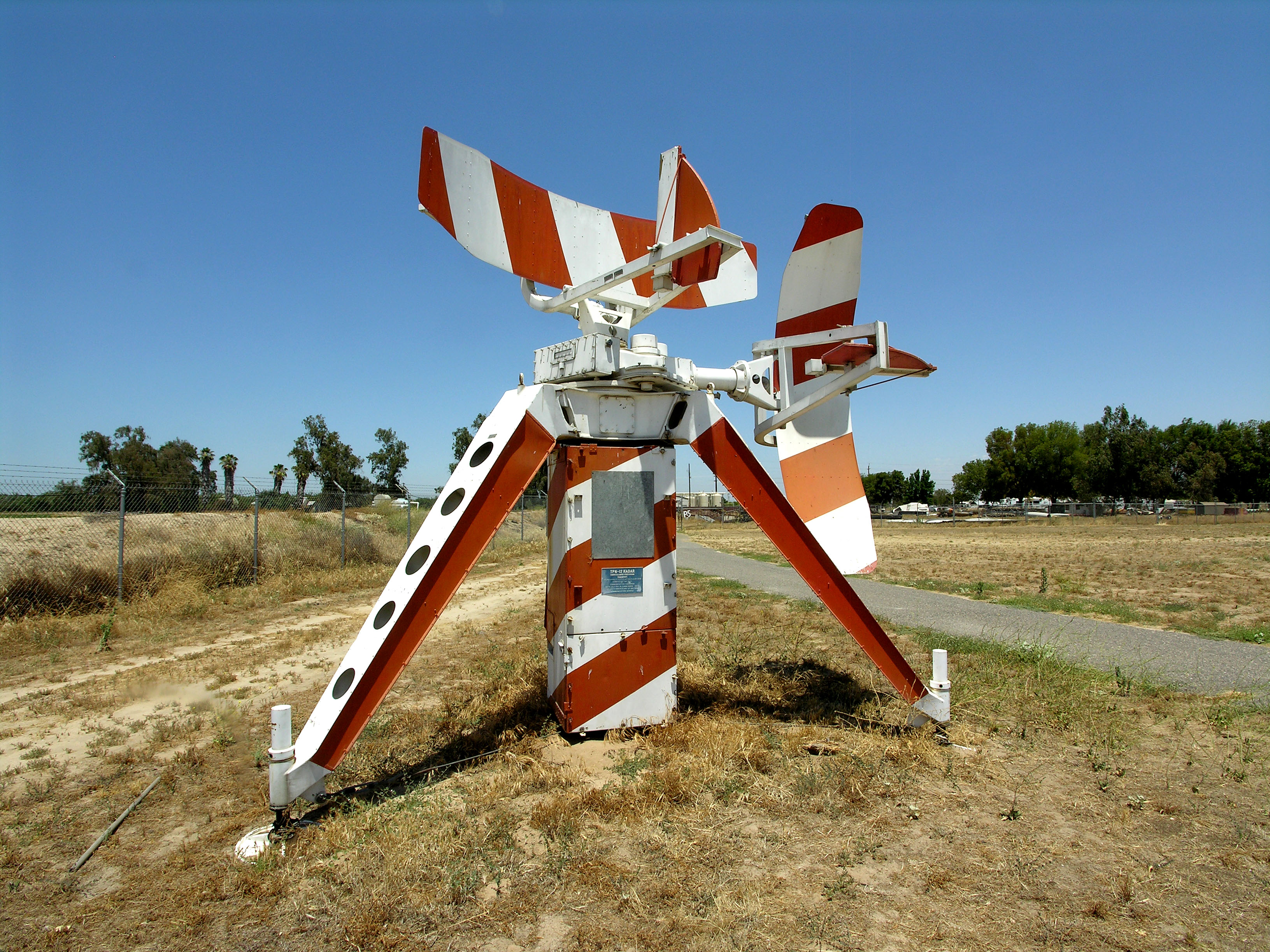
AN/TPN-12 GCA/PAR

A traditional PAR flight inspection procedure is performed without a navigation signal available to compare directly to a truth reference. A traditional PAR is flight inspected by comparing written notes between two observers, one taking notes at a truth reference system such as a theodolite and the other observer taking notes while observing the radar console; see ICAO Document 8071. The Transponder Landing System (TLS) non-traditional PAR can transmit an ILS signal that corresponds to the aircraft position relative to the precision approach. Therefore, the graphical depiction can be directly verified using Instrument Landing System (ILS) flight inspection techniques. This direct measurement removes some ambiguity from the PAR flight inspection process.

== See also ==
- Index of aviation articles
- Acronyms and abbreviations in avionics
- Instrument approach
- TLS - Transponder Landing System
- Ground-controlled approach
- AN/MPN
- Electronics Technician
