= AN/MPN =

Mobile ground-controlled approach radars introduced during World War II

AN/MPN is the US Military prefix designation for a group of mobile ground-controlled approach (GCA) radars first introduced during World War II. "MPN" is the Joint Electronics Type Designation System (JETDS) nomenclature for mobile (M, ground mobile systems), radar (P), navigational aid (N). The AN/MPN designation is then followed by a hyphen and a number to denote the sequence in which that particular system was developed and manufactured.

== Variants ==
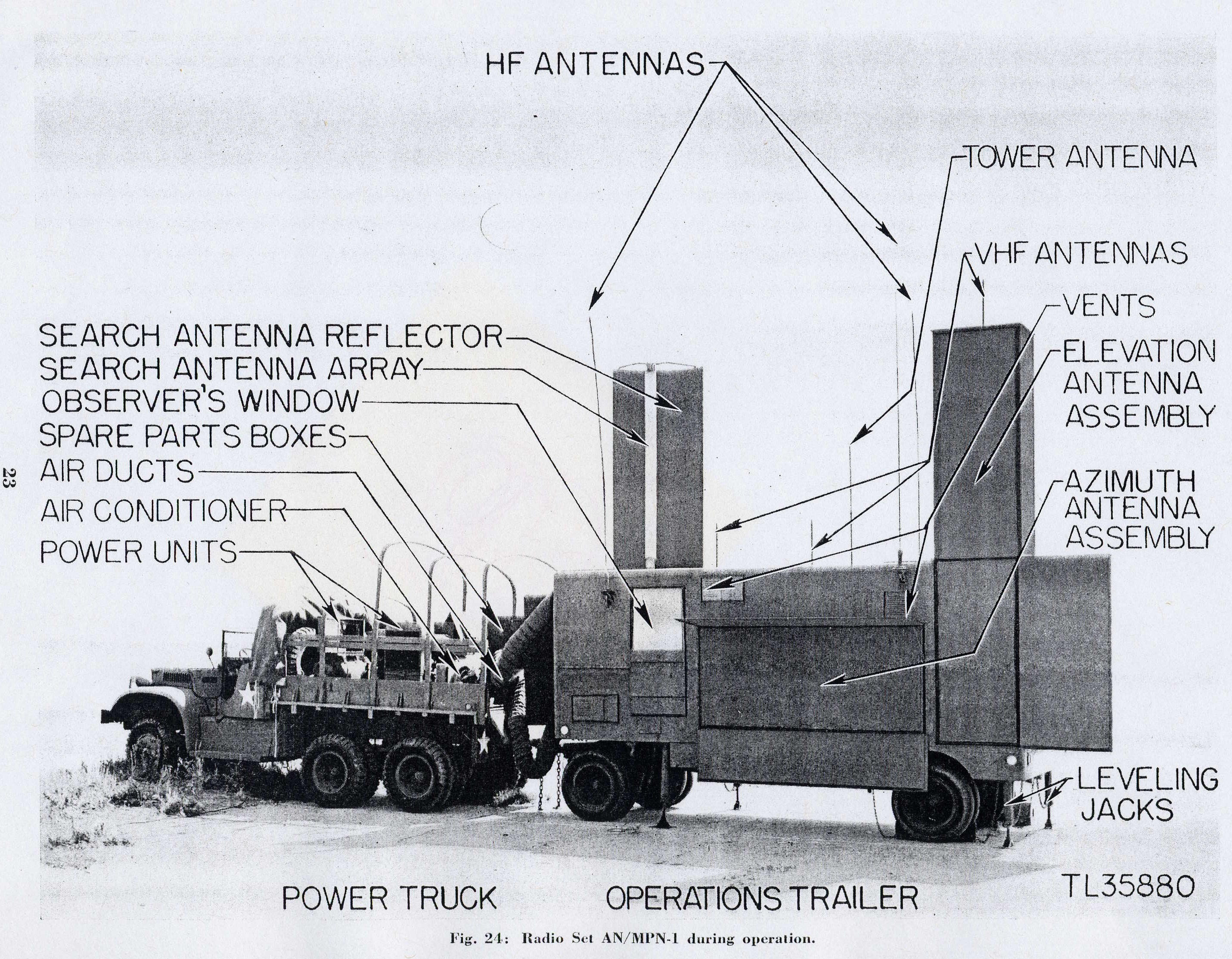
AN/MPN-1 radar, 1944

AN/MPN-1
Developed first by Gilfillan in the early 1940s, and later by Bendix Aviation, the system (called a "radio set") operated as a ground-controlled approach (GCA) system with a combined mobile military precision approach radar (PAR) and airport surveillance radar (ASR). It assisted in directing aircraft over a predetermined glide path for safe approach to an aerodrome runway under conditions approaching zero visibility. The system was introduced during World War II. The radars (PAR/ASR) provided range, azimuth and elevation information of aircraft within a radius of 10 miles (8.7 nmi; 16 km) for PAR and 30 mi (26 nmi; 48 km) for ASR.

The 15 kW PAR operated in the X-band frequency range while the 80 kW ASR operated in the S-band range. The azimuth antenna had a 1° beam width and a 2° height in elevation while the elevation antenna had a 3.6° width and 0.6° height with both antennas having a 30 RPM scanning rate. With a 20° horizontal azimuth beam width and a 7° elevation beam, the system had a 4,000-foot (1,200 m) operational ceiling.

A Diamond T 4-ton 6×6 truck (G-509) was the original prime mover hauling a 4-wheeled trailer which contained the bulk of the operational equipment. Also included on the Diamond T truck were two PE-127-A gasoline-driven power generators, providing 117-volt, 60-hertz electrical power, an air conditioner, and a spare parts box. High frequency (HF) and very high frequency (VHF) communications were provided by an SCR-274 transmitter, and BC-342 receivers. Ultra high frequency (UHF) communications were added later via tactical radios normally jeep mounted for use by forward air controllers.

AN/MPN-2
Originally developed by Meissner Manufacturing for the US Navy, the MPN-2 was a mobile radio/radar beacon transponder for navigational aid and homing facilities for aircraft. Its major components, AN/CPN-6 and AN/CPN-8, were mounted in a trailer van. The MPN-2 operated in the X-band, transmitting with 40 kW of power at 9.31 gigahertz (3.22 cm) while receiving signals between 9.32 and 9.43 GHz (3.22 and 3.18 cm), and S-band, transmitting with 1.1 kW of power at 3.256 GHz (9.21 cm) and receiving between 3.267 and 3.333 GHz (9.18 and 8.99 cm).

AN/MPN-3
Another GCA system manufactured by Bendix with an ASR operating in the S-band and PAR in the X-band. Specifically, the ASR operated from 2.7 to 2.9 GHz (11 to 10 cm) and the PAR from 9.08 to 9.17 GHz (3.30 to 3.27 cm). The system, transmitting with a peak power of 45 kW, had a range of 30 mi (26 nmi; 48 km). The ASR had a 4,000 ft (1,200 m) operating ceiling. The system overall was similar to the MPN-1 with the exception of a single, rather than redundant dual radar sets for each channel. This improved mobility by decreasing weight also reducing the number of personnel required to operate the system. The MPN-3 also used the Diamond T 4-ton truck as a prime mover and a 4-wheeled equipment trailer, just as the MPN-1

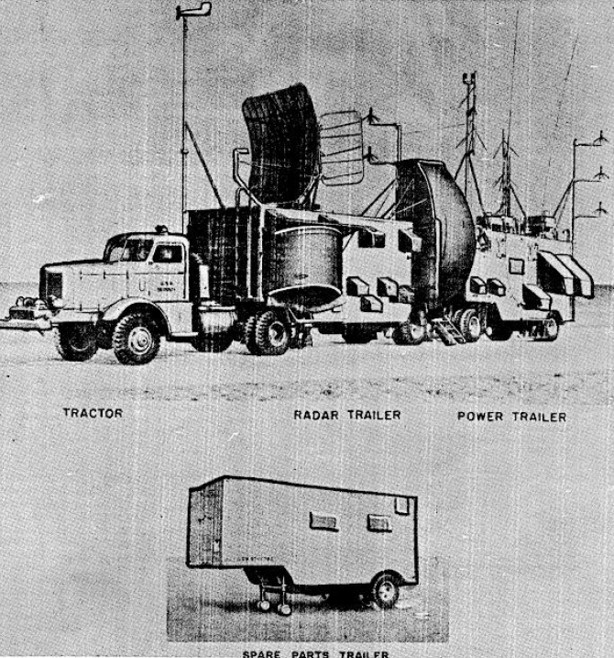
AN/MPN-5 in July 1964

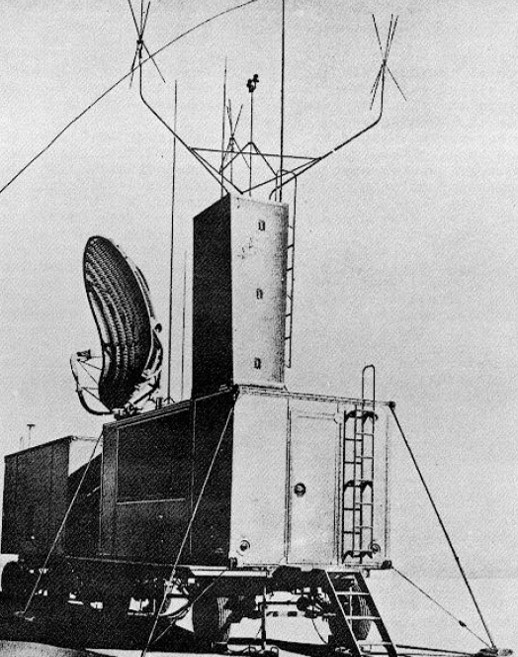
AN/MPN-11 radar in October 1964

AN/MPN-5
Also produced by Bendix, this S- and X-band GCA system used two distinct radar sets; the search radar equipment (SRE) and precision approach radar (PAR). The 350 kW (400 W average) SRE operated in the S-band from 2.74 to 2.9 GHz (10.9 to 10.3 cm) and had a range of about 58 miles (50 nmi; 93 km). Its pulse-repetition frequency (PRF) was 1.2 kHz with a pulsewidth of 0.8 μs. The X-band PAR operated from 9 to 9.18 GHz (3.33 to 3.27 cm) at a much lower power of just 35 kW resulting in a much shorter, expected, range of 12 mi (10 nmi; 19 km). The PAR had a higher PRF of 2.4 kHz and a wider pulsewidth of 0.25 μs.

AN/MPN-8
Identical to the AN/MPN-2 with the modified addition of an "H" facility, transmitting a 400-watt signal between 300 and 600 kHz (1,000 and 500 m).

AN/MPN-11
Manufactured by Gilfillan Brothers for the US Air Force, the MPN-11 Landing Control Set was also a combined ASR/PAR S/X-band GCA system, the trailer-mounted ASR was a version of the AN/CPN-4 radar. This system incorporated a new moving target indication (MTI) mode to help remove echos from stationary targets. The MPN-11 and CPN-4 components were completely interchangeable with the only differences being that one had bolted trailer panels while the other had riveted panels.

The MPN-11 had 4 variants, MPN-11A, -11B, -11C and -11D. The MPN-11A used HF, AN/ARC-3 VHF and AN/ARC-27 UHF radios for communicaitons and had a self-contained power source. The -11B also used a self-contained power source, as well as the same VHF and UHF radios, but used AN/ART-13 and AN/ARR-15 for HF. The -11C used an external power generator, a 7.5 t (7.4 long tons; 8.3 short tons) air conditioner, and a power distribution panel. The -11D model was similar to the -11C with automatic frequency control (AFC) and was fully interchangeable with the -11C.

The 600 kW peak power ASR transmitter operated between 2.78 and 2.82 GHz (10.8 and 10.6 cm) with a range of 20 to 30 mi (17 to 26 nmi; 32 to 48 km) based on type of aircraft tracked. The PAR transmitted a 45 kW peak signal between 9 and 9.16 GHz (3.33 and 3.27 cm) with a range of 10 mi (8.7 nmi; 16 km).

AN/MPN-13
Mobile PAR developed by ITT-Gilfillan operating between 2.7 and 2.9 GHz (11.10 and 10.34 cm) at 45 kW and between 9 and 9.16 GHz (3.33 and 3.27 cm) at 500 kW with a range of just 10 mi (16 km)

AN/MPN-14
Mobile ground approach system which could be configured as a complete Radar Approach Control (RAPCON) or GCA facility used by air traffic controllers to identify, sequence, and separate participating aircraft, provide final approach guidance through air defense corridors and zones, and coordinate ID and intent with local air defense units at assigned airports and air bases. These services can be provided in all types of weather. It identifies aircraft using secondary radar to a 230 mi (200 nmi; 370 km) radius and primary radar coverage to 69 mi (60 nmi; 111 km). The PAR provides both azimuth and elevation information from 17 mi (15 nmi; 27 km) to touchdown. Both the PAR and ASR can be used as final approach aids. The MPN-14 has three ASR display indicators and one PAR indicator located in the operations shelter, and one each ASR and PAR indicator located in the maintenance shelter. Complete operations are conducted from the operations trailer. The system is limited to a single runway but has the capability of providing opposite direction runway operations with the aid of a transportable turntable.

AN/MPN-17
Another ITT-Gilfillan manufactured mobile landing control radar operating between 2.7 and 2.82 GHz (11.1 and 10.6 cm) and between 3 and 10 GHz (10.0 and 3.0 cm)

AN/MPN-23
Manufactured by Raytheon, the MPN-23 is a trailer-mounted version of an X-band solid-state Naval/Marine Corps Air Station (NAS/MCAS) PAR known as the AN/FPN-63. With an 8° elevation and 20° azimuth, the 80 kW peak power transmitter has a range of 10 to 20 mi (8.7 to 17.4 nmi; 16 to 32 km). The system uses a fixed PRF of 2.75 kHz or staggered PRF centered on 3.3 kHz and a pulsewidth of 0.2 μs.

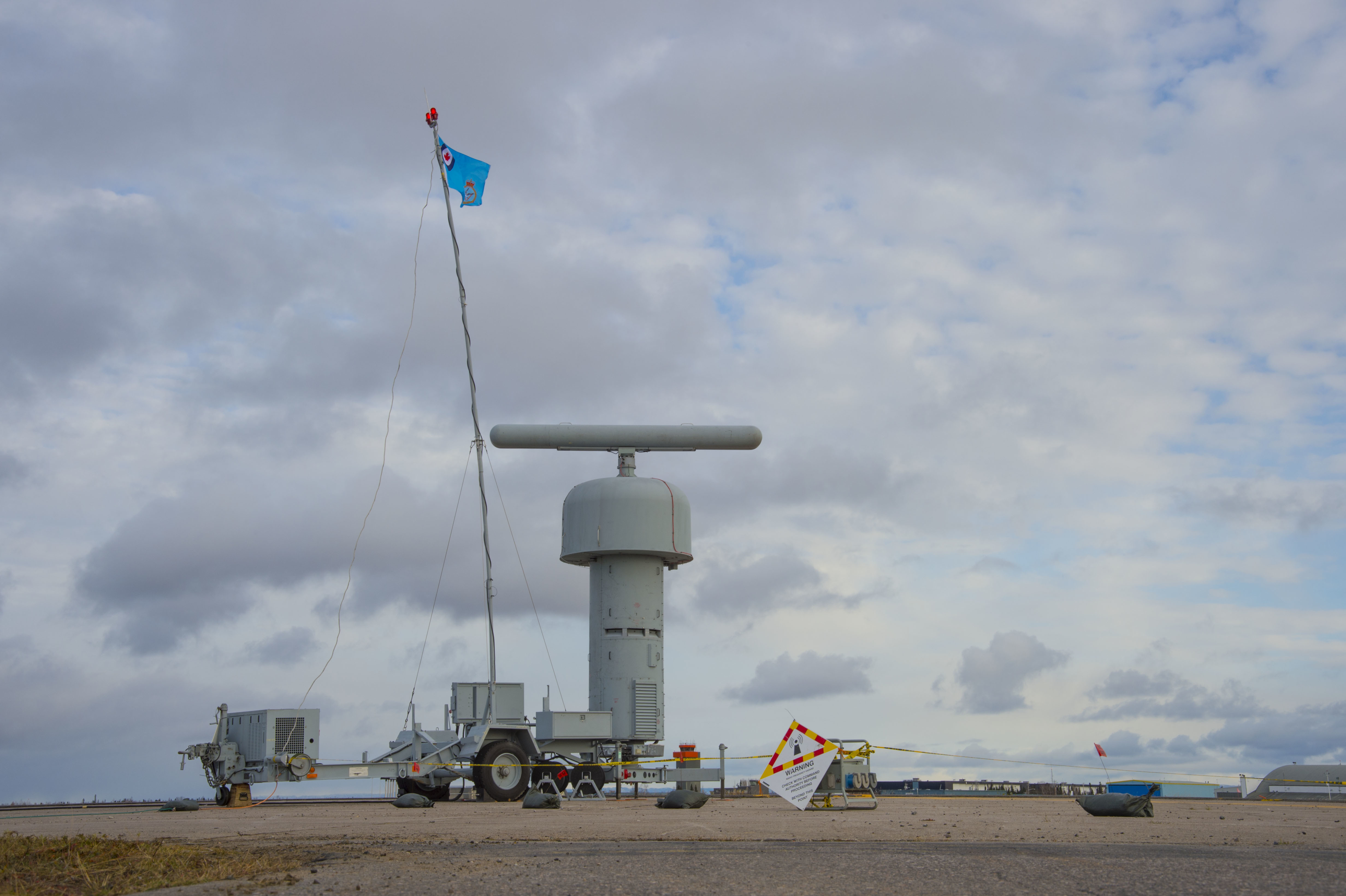
AN/MPN-25 radar during Exercise Vigilant Shield 2015, Happy Valley-Goose Bay, Newfoundland and Labrador, Canada

AN/MPN-25
Based on the ITT Inc. commercial product called GCA-2000, the MPN-25 is an all-weather phased array GCA system that scans the PAR and 360 degree ASR areas using the same antenna and includes a height finding capability. As opposed to earlier AN/MPN systems, the MPN-25 also includes a secondary surveillance radar utilizing an independently rotating antenna. The phased array antennas of the ASR/PAR consist of gallium arsenide (GaAs) transmit/receive modules (TRM) calibrated for phase and power to allow formation of the RF beam in space. It also incorporates fiber-optic links for faster real-time control.

The system then processes the raw target data to form a data word sending it to a computer display operating on Solaris. It has a 35 mi (30 nmi; 56 km) ASR range and 23 mi (20 nmi; 37 km) for PAR coverage. The system can operate in three different modes to include ASR, PAR and combined mode. In ASR mode, the azimuth antenna spins at 60 RPMs and the system is only used to process targets typical to any ASR, also utilizing an AN/TPX-56 identification friend or foe (IFF) system to identify targets. Both raw returns and IFF are processed in the tracker. In PAR mode the azimuth antenna does not spin and is fixed normally on the reciprocal runway heading in azimuth and elevation planes to process typical PAR targets. In combined mode the azimuth antenna spins at 60 RPMs to provide the 1 second ICAO update rate to the PAR display. The display software has two modes of operation ASR/PAR. The PAR display utilizes ITT software and the ASR software is a derivative of BDM software used at several ranges.

AN/MPN-26
A program that was never accepted by the government, cancelled in 2008. Earlier radars included the AN/FPN-36 "Quad Radar", a compact and portable system that could function as either an airport surveillance radar, GCA radar, non-precision ASR approach radar, or airport surface detection equipment, and the AN/CPN-4, a larger, more modern and precise system that provided those functions.

== See also ==
- Air traffic control
- Air traffic control radar beacon system
- LORAN
- Rebecca/Eureka transponding radar

=== Lists ===
- List of radars
- List of U.S. Signal Corps vehicles
- List of military electronics of the United States
- List of similar US military air traffic control radars
