= AN/TPQ-2 Close Air Support System =

US military Cold War-era aircraft guidance system

- Country of origin: United States
- Manufacturer: Reeves Instrument Corporation
- Frequency: 2,740 to 2,960 MHz
- Range: 20,000 yd max, 500 yd min
- Azimuth: 360°
- Power: Peak 200 kw (83 db above 1 mw)

The AN/TPQ-2 Close Air Support System was a post-World War II radar/computer/communications system ("Q" system) for automatically tracking an aircraft and guiding it to a predetermined bomb release point. The system was the predecessor of the General Electric AN/MPQ-14 Course Directing Central deployed to the Korean War for ground-directed bombing.

In accordance with the Joint Electronics Type Designation System (JETDS), the "AN/TPQ-2" designation represents the second design of an Army-Navy electronic device for ground transportable special combination radar system. The JETDS system also now is used to name all Department of Defense electronic systems.

External images
- Pilotless Aircraft Unit cartoon
- Loon launched from submarine

== Background ==
After the Air Medal was awarded for development of ground-directed bombing in Italy for World War II Close Air Support, a detachment of NAS Mojave's "Pilotless Aircraft Unit" was established in 1945 on a SeaBee military installation at Point Mugu (4 officers and 11 enlisted men). A Bureau of Aeronautics committee's December 1945 Study of the Requirements for Pilotless Aircraft for Fleet Use in 1950 was approved 3 months later, and the KGW-1 Loon was 1 of its 18 missile proposals. The detachment's "Marine LtCol Marion Dalby and Dr. Herbert Wagner", the latter arriving by Operation Paperclip in early 1946, developed "NAVAIR’s TPQ-2 Close Air Support System" for command guidance of the KGW-1 Loon missile for submarine attacks on mapped Japanese "beach-head fortifications". Point Mugu development of the KGW-1 and its test launch facilities were by "Jack Schoenhair's gang" and included additional Operation Paperclip scientists "Willy Fiedler, Robert Lusser and Otto Schwede". The 1st KGW-1 launch was in January 1946, and its 1st submarine launch was February 12, 1947, using rocket assist developed by Robert Truax's team.

== Description ==
The transportable AN/TPQ-2 included a World War II surplus SCR-584 radar and, as in the AN/MSQ-1, a Reeves Instrument Corporation analog computer for converting the radar's spherical coordinates to rectangular coordinates, and a Reeves "plotting board to yield course changes, a warhead arming signal and a dump [dive] command to the Loon". A "Marine F6F fighter" was to escort the KGW-1 for safety (e.g., to abort by shooting a missile straying back over land) and during simulated KGW-1 missions, MSgt. Clark. D Hayden used the system to instead control the crewed fighter. During Dalby's 2nd mission piloting a "Loon simulation flight" he "wondered why ... prefer [sub-launched, 1,000 lb payload] Loon over a two thousand lb. Bomb" from a piloted aircraft launched by a carrier. Dalby briefed Point Mugu's Director of Tests, Captain Grayson Merrill, when "both realized ... we were talking about [an] all-weather, close-air support system" and "Dalby and I conceived the idea of converting [its use to] Close Air Support."

Dalby and Cpt. Samuel A. Dressin redesigned the system (e.g., switched from the SCR-584 to the SCR-784 radar), and the TPQ-2 was demonstrated at Camp Pendelton in April 1950. Dalby claimed dummy bombs from 18,000 ft (5,500 m) would drop within 150 yd (140 m) of the target, and a direct hit on a terrain feature was observed by the 1st Marine Air Wing Chief of Staff. Lt. Col. Homer G. Hutchinson helped the project receive support including two F4U night-fighters and pilots for training.

== See also ==
- List of radars
- List of military electronics of the United States
