= Chevrolet G506 =

American Army four wheel drive truck

Chevrolet G506 truck
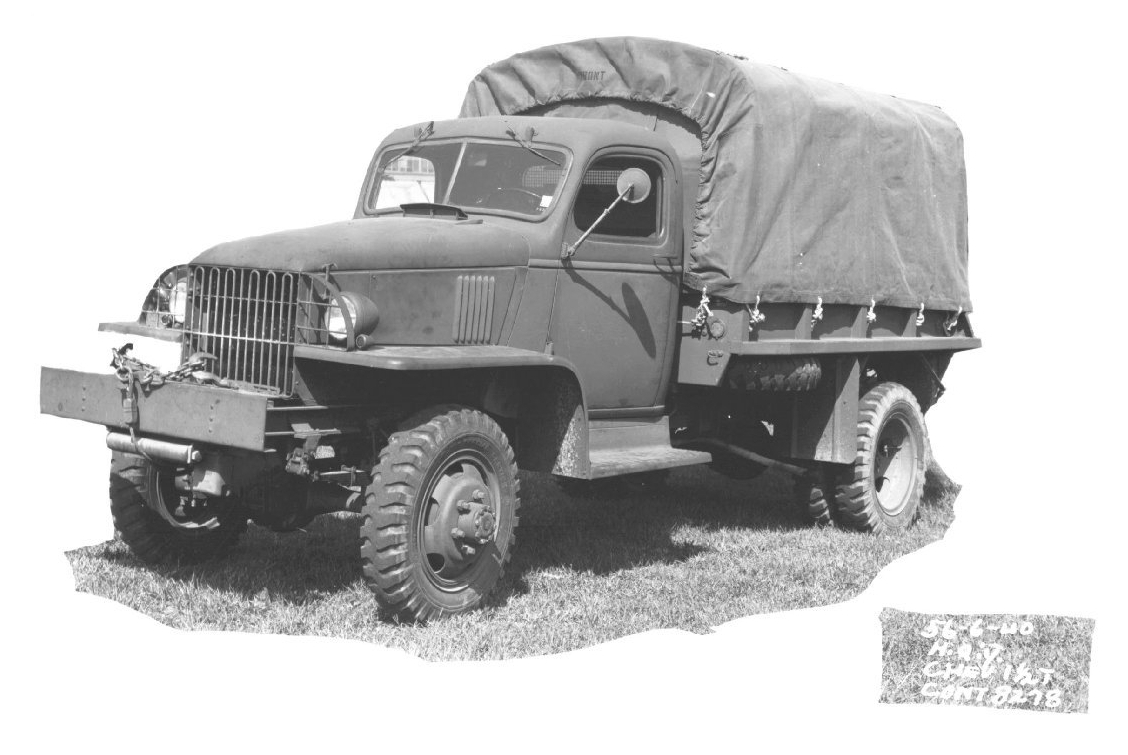
- Chevrolet 1 1/2-ton cargo truck with winch (pilot model)
- Type: 1 1/2-ton 4x4 truck
- Place of origin: United States

Production history
- Manufacturer: Pontiac West Assembly, Yellow Coach/GM Truck and Coach
- Produced: 1940–45
- No. built: 154,204

Specifications (G-7107 cargo with winch)
- Mass: 7,545 lb (3,422 kg)
- Length: 18 ft 8 in (5.69 m) overall 12 ft 1 in (3.68 m) wheelbase
- Width: 7 ft 2 in (2.18 m)
- Height: 8 ft 11 in (2.72 m)
- Engine: Chevrolet BV1001 235; 235 1/2 cu in (3,859 cc) I6 petrol 83 hp (62 kW) at 3,100 rpm
- Payload capacity: 1 1/2 short tons (1.4 t)
- Drive: 4x4
- Transmission: 4-forward, 1-reverse manual 2-speed transfer case
- Suspension: Live axles on semi-elliptical leaf springs
- Operational range: 270 mi (434.5 km)
- Maximum speed: 48 mph (77 km/h)
- References: Doyle 2003, p. 98, Ware 2014, p. 135

The G-506 trucks, 1 1/2-ton, 4x4, produced as the Chevrolet G7100 (and originally G4100) models, were a series of (light) medium four wheel drive trucks used by the United States Army and its allies during and after World War II. This series came in standard cargo, as well as many specialist type bodies.

== History ==
The G506 was a United States Army Ordnance Corps supply catalog designation for the 1 1/2-ton, 4X4, truck chassis built in large numbers by the Chevrolet Motor Division of GM. Their official model numbers were initially the "G4100", and later the "G7100" series. They became standard 1 1/2-ton 4x4 trucks for the US Army and Army Air Corps during World War II.

During World War II, the US military purchased a total of 167,373 four by four 1 1/2-ton trucks, and Chevrolet supplied the great majority of them. According to the 1946 revision of the U.S. military's Summary Report of Acceptances, Tank-Automotive Materiel, Dodge (Fargo) – the initial standard supplier of U.S. 1 1/2-ton 4x4 trucks – contributed 6,762 VF model, G-621 series trucks in 1940; and Ford (Marmon-Herrington) and Diamond T supplied another 6,271 and 136 units respectively, leaving 154,204 Chevrolet trucks.

However, some 47,700 of the G7107 and G7117 model trucks were shipped to the Soviet Union as part of the Lend-Lease program. The Soviet Red Army's logistics/transport capabilities improved dramatically in the spring and summer of 1943 largely as a result of the steady supply of American-made trucks (such as Studebaker US6s and the Chevrolet G506s) for the USSR.

== Specifications ==
=== Engine and driveline ===
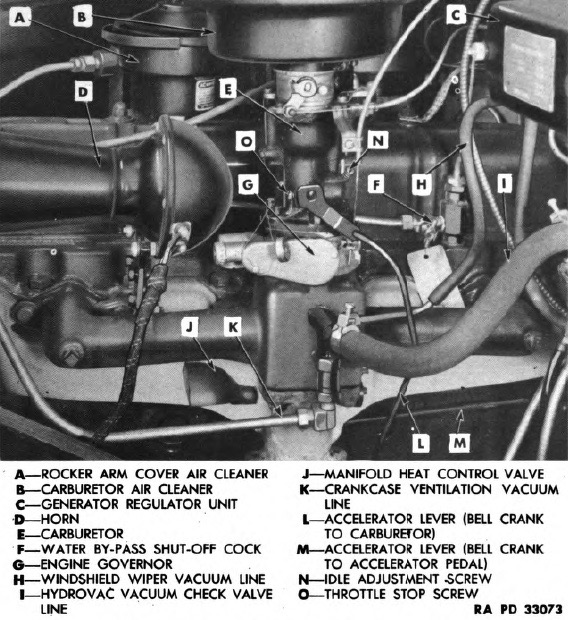
Chevrolet BV-1001 engine (left side, front of truck to left)

The G506 used a Chevrolet BV-1001-UP, a 235 cu in (3.9 L) overhead valve inline-six cylinder gasoline engine developing 83 hp (62 kW) at 3,100 rpm and 184 lbf⋅ft (249 N⋅m) of torque at 1,000 rpm. This is a smaller version of the engine used in the GMC CCKW.

All models had a four-speed manual non-synchronized transmission and a two-speed transfer case.

=== Chassis ===
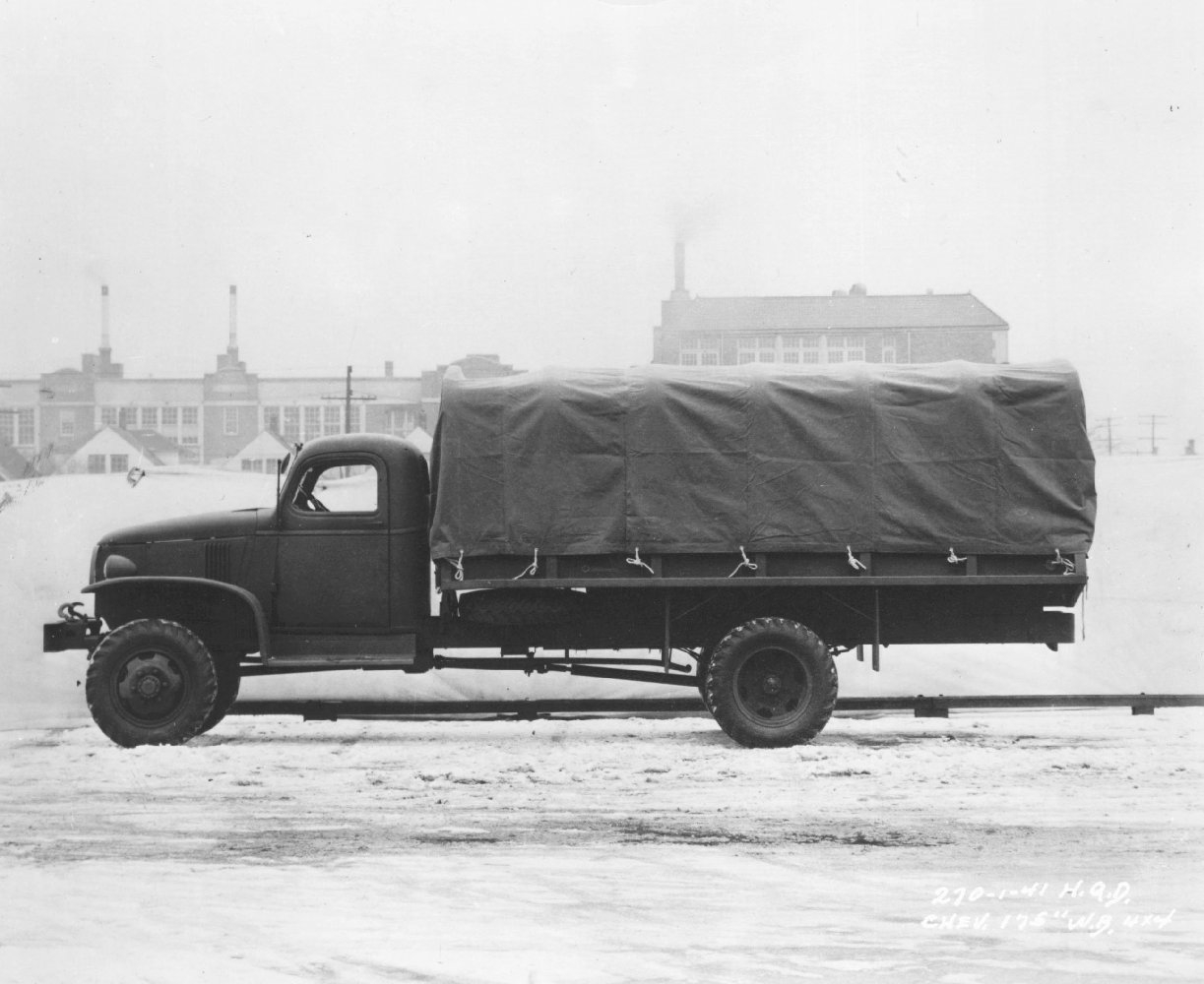
The G506 long wheelbase cargo model

The G506 had a ladder frame with two live beam axles on semi-elliptic leaf springs. GM banjo type axles were used, these axles were also used in later GMC CCKW 2 1/2 ton (2,268kg) trucks. There were three wheelbases, 125 in (318 cm) extra short wheelbase used only on the G7128 Bomb servicer, 145 in (368 cm) short wheelbase (a majority of production), and the 175 in (444 cm) long wheelbase. All models had hydraulic brakes with vacuum boost, 7.50-20" tires and dual rear tires.

=== Body ===
Almost all G-506s had closed Chevrolet cabs, shared with the closed cab versions of the GMC CCKW – except for three models. A panel van version was built for the Army Signal Corps, open cabs were used on bomb servicers and cab over engine types were used for long-bodied cargo trucks. The pilot models had flat top panels of the front fender, but production trucks had arches over at the fender crowns.

== Versions ==
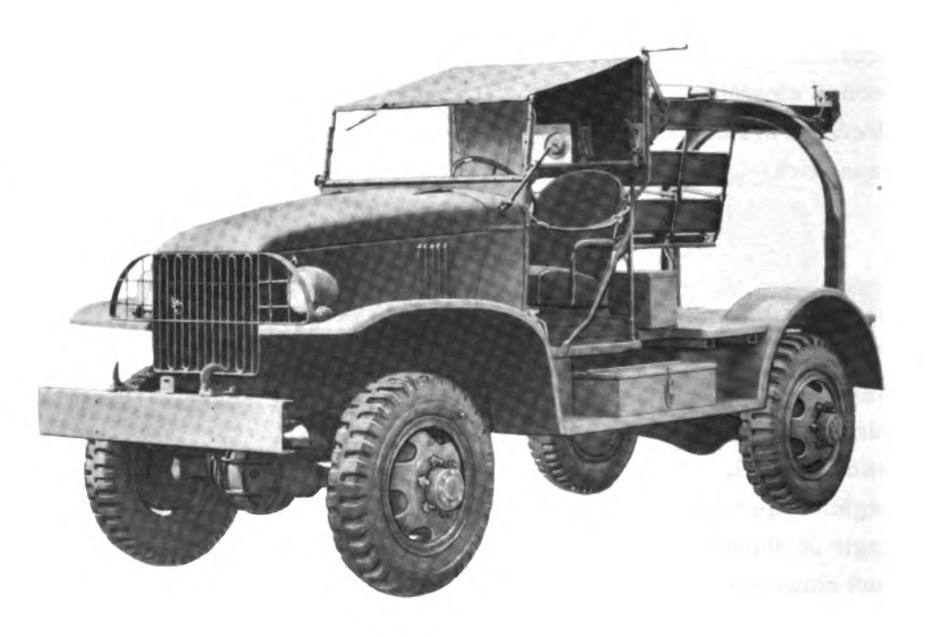
Bomb server

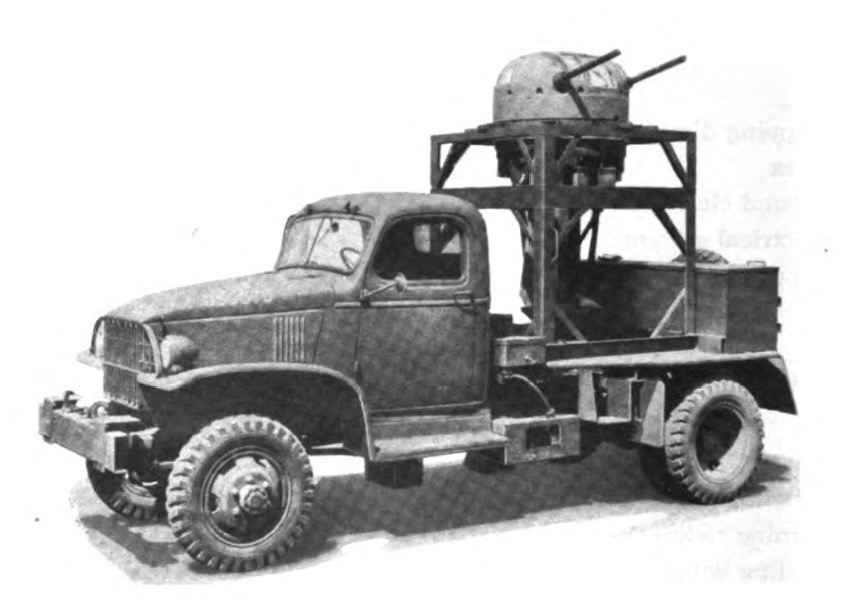
Turret trainer

- Model G4103 book symbol YK - stake and platform COE, K-33 truck
- Model G4112 book symbol YQ - truck cargo, LWB, 4X4,
- Model G4163 book symbol ZP - truck cargo, W/Winch, 4X4,
- Model G4174 book symbol ZQ - truck cargo, LWB, 4X4,
- Model G7103 book symbol NE - cab
- Model G7105 book symbol NG - panel body, see also K-51, and K-70 van
- Model G7106 book symbol NH - dump body, less winch (9,008 built without a winch)
- Model G7107 book symbol NJ - cargo body, less winch (86,871 built)
- Model G7113 book symbol NK - cab (tractor)
- Model G7116 book symbol NL - dump body, with winch (5,133 built with a winch)
- Model G7117 book symbol NM - cargo body, with winch (26,207 built)
- Model G7127 book symbol NP - truck cargo, LWB (long wheelbase, 383 built)
- Model G7128 book symbol NQ - M6 bomb service truck G35 (extra-short wheelbase, 7,868 built)
- Model G7132 book symbol NN - stake and platform COE, K-54 Truck
- Model G7163 book symbol NR - telephone body, with earth borer, see also K-44 truck

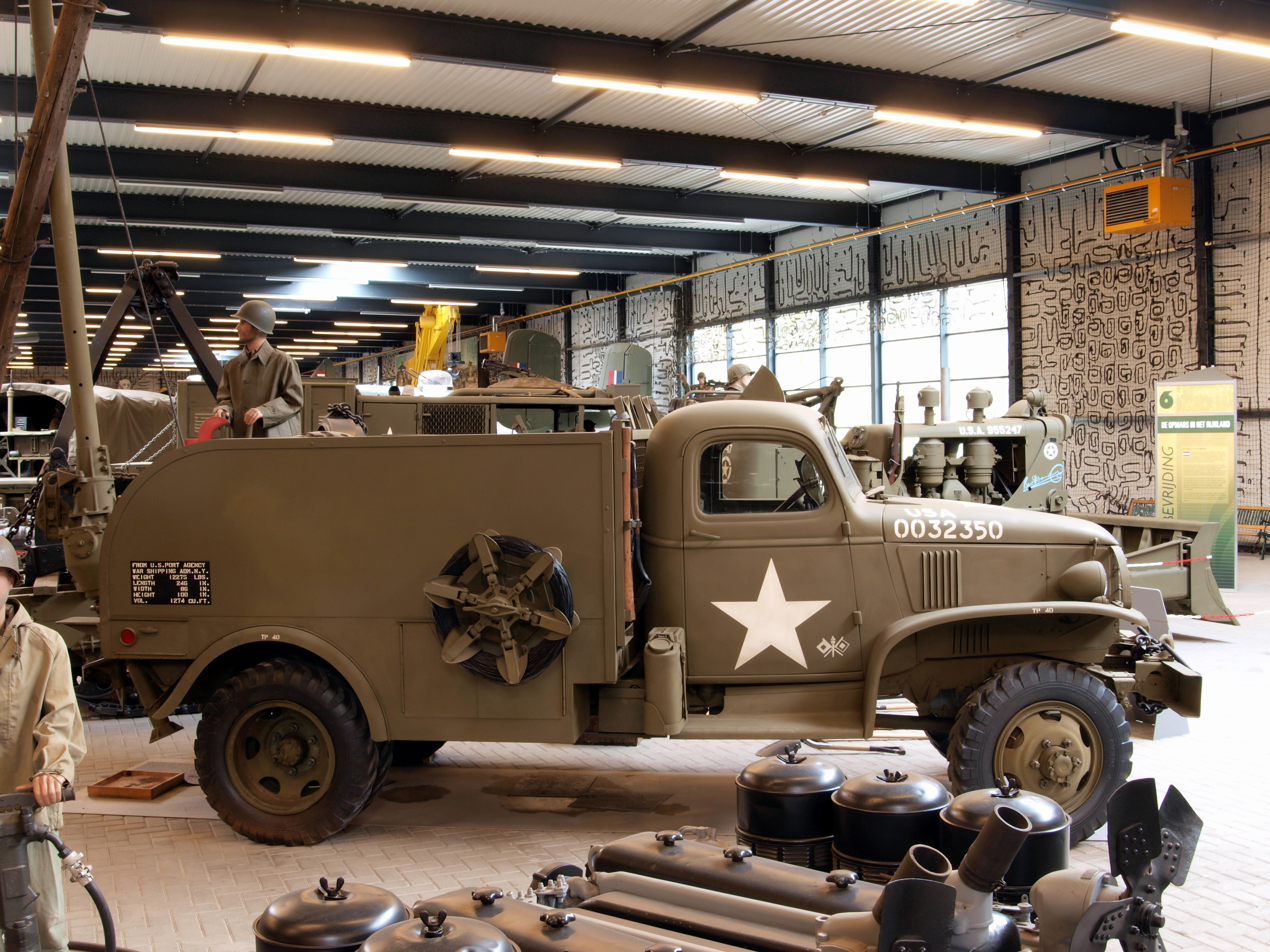
Pole setter

- Model G7173 book symbol NS - telephone maintenance body, see also K-43 truck

Army Air Force versions

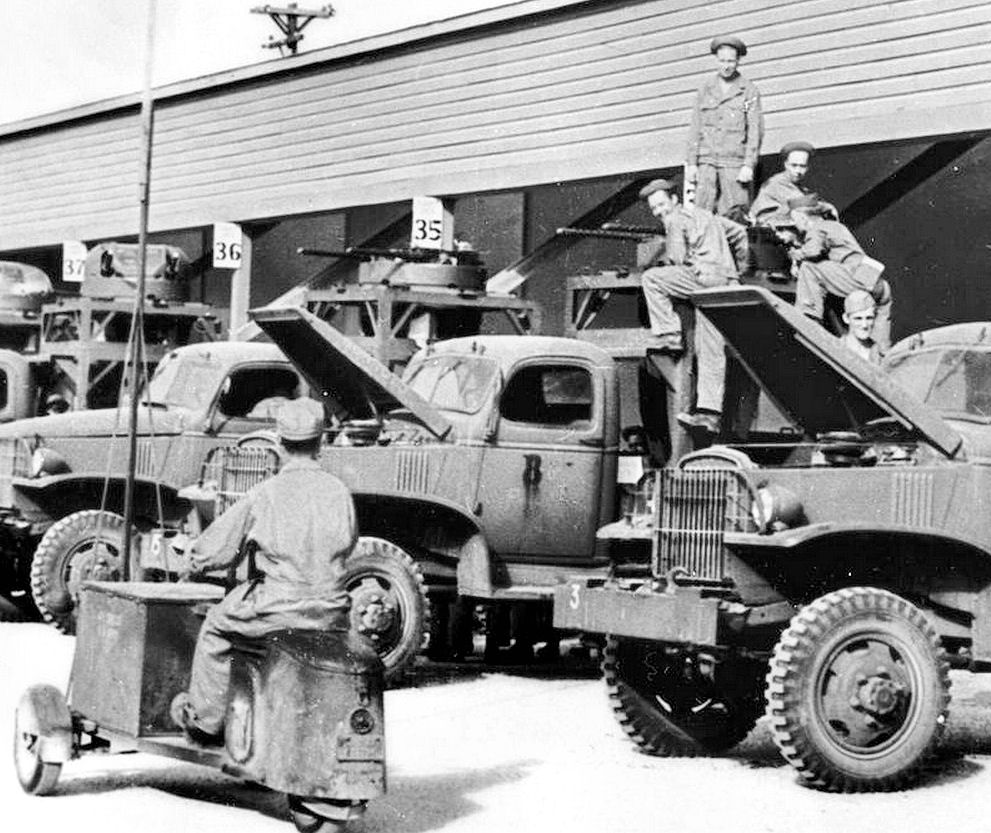
Turret trainers

- E5 turret trainer
- J3 field lighting truck
- J4 field lighting truck
- J5 field lighting truck
- fire truck, class 135, fog and foam

== See also ==
- List of U.S. military vehicles by supply catalog designation (G506)
- List of U.S. Signal Corps vehicles
