= SCR-527 =

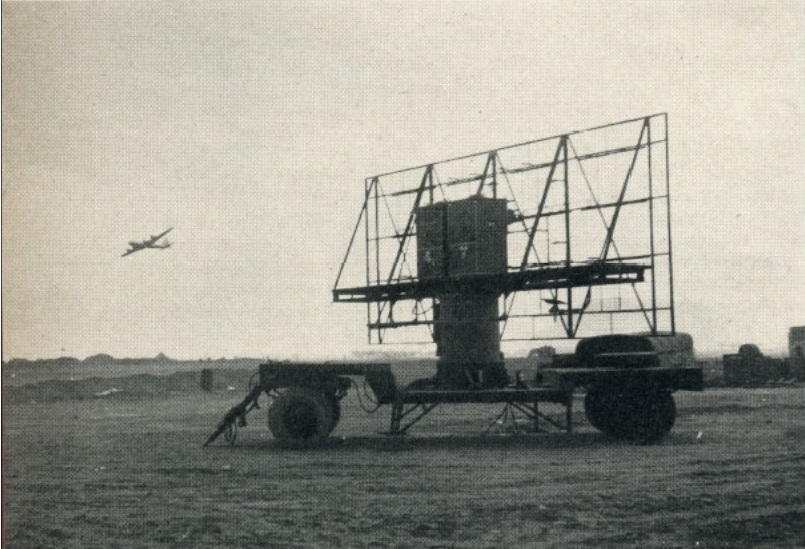
- SCR-527 on Iwo Jima in March 1945
- Country of origin: United States
- Type: Medium-range search radar

The SCR-527 (Signal Corps Radio model 527) was a medium-range radar used by the United States for early warning and ground-controlled interception (GCI) during World War II.
