= SCR-584 radar =

Automatic tracking microwave radar

SCR-584
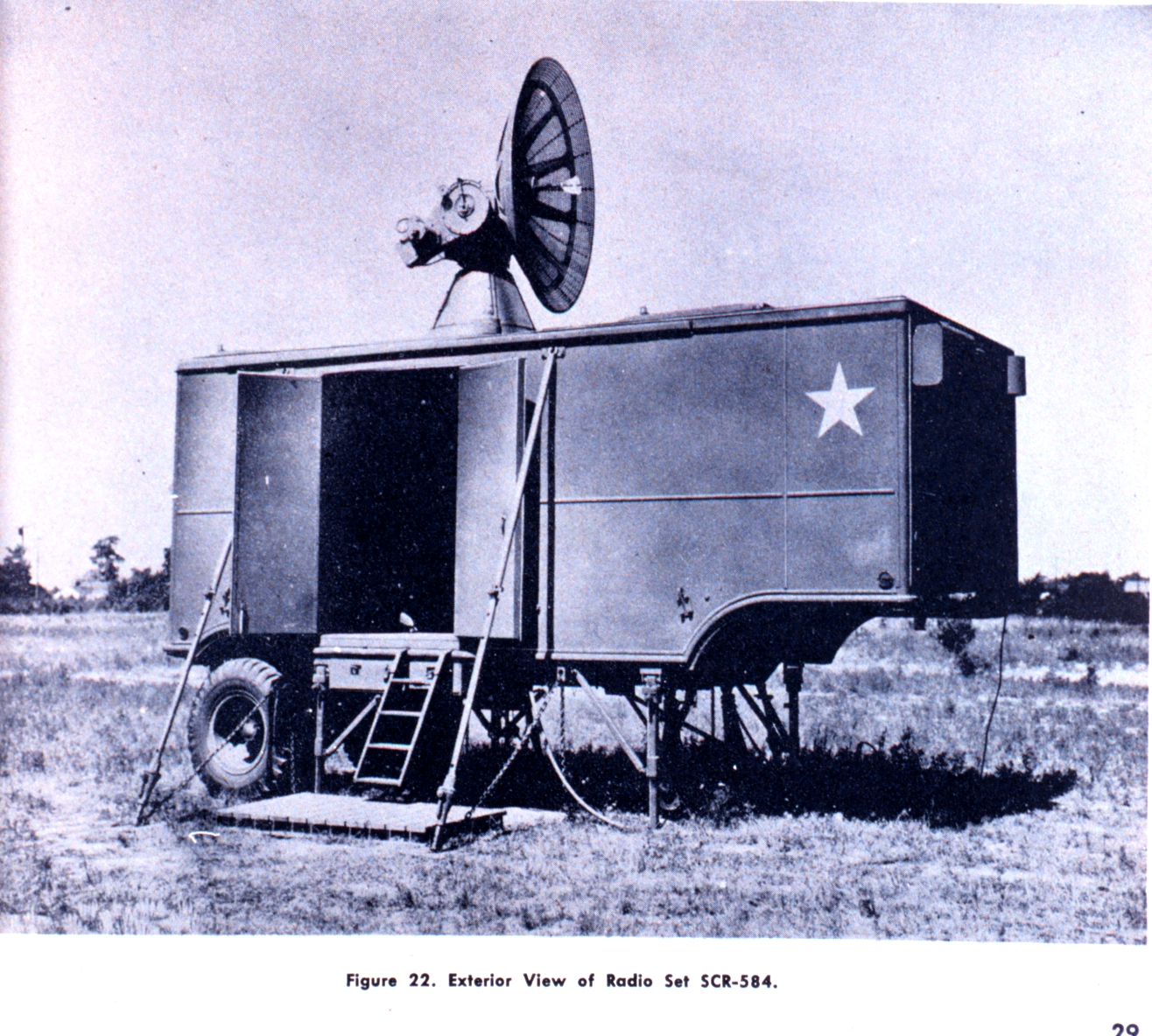
- Exterior view. All operational equipment was housed inside, although the M-9 director and electrical generators were separate. The antenna retracts into the van for travel.
- Country of origin: US
- Designer: MIT Radiation Laboratory
- Frequency: Four bands around 3,000 MHz
- PRF: 1707 pulses per second
- Pulsewidth: 0.8 microsecond
- Range: 70,000 yd (40 mi; 64 km)
- Diameter: 6 ft (1.8 m)
- Azimuth: 360°
- Elevation: −175 mils (−9.8°) to +1,580 mils (+88.9°)
- Precision: Range error: 25 yd (23 m); azimuth error: 1 mil (0.06°); elevation accuracy: 1 mil (0.06°)
- Power: 250 kW
- Related: Data from U.S. War Department Technical Manuals TM11-1324 and TM11-1524 (published April 1946 by the United States Government Printing Office)

The SCR-584 (short for Set, Complete, Radio #584) was an automatic-tracking microwave radar developed by the MIT Radiation Laboratory during World War II. It was one of the most advanced ground-based radars of its era and became one of the primary gun-laying radars used worldwide well into the 1950s. A trailer-mounted mobile version was the SCR-784.

In 1937, America's first fire-control radar, the SCR-268 radar, had proven to be insufficiently accurate due in part to its long wavelength. In 1940, Vannevar Bush, heading the National Defense Research Committee, established the "Microwave Committee" (section D-1) and the "Fire Control" division (D-2) to develop a more advanced radar anti-aircraft system in time to assist the British air-defense effort. In September of that year, a British delegation, the Tizard Mission, revealed to US and Canadian researchers that they had developed a magnetron oscillator operating at the top end of the UHF band (10 cm wavelength, 3 GHz frequency), allowing greatly increased accuracy. Bush organized the Radiation Laboratory (Rad Lab) at the MIT to develop applications using it. This included a new short-range air-defense radar.

Alfred Lee Loomis, running the Rad Lab, advocated the development of an entirely automatic tracking system controlled by servomechanisms. This greatly eased the task of tracking targets and reduced the manpower needed to do it. They were also able to take advantage of a newly developed microwave switch that allowed them to use a single antenna for broadcast and reception, greatly simplifying the mechanical layout. The resulting design fit into a single trailer, could provide all-sky search and single-target tracking, and followed the targets automatically. In close contact with the Rad Lab, Bell Telephone Laboratories was developing an electronic analog gun director that would be used in conjunction with the radar and servo-actuated 90 mm anti-aircraft guns.

The SCR-584 was intended to be introduced in late 1943, but due to delays did not reach field units until early 1944. They began replacing the earlier and more complex SCR-268 as the US Army's primary anti-aircraft gun-laying system as quickly as they could be produced. They proved easier to use in the field than the less advanced Canadian/British GL Mk. III radar, and many SCR-584s were rushed to England, where they were an important part of the defences developed to counter the V1 flying bomb. By the end of the war they had been used to track artillery shells in flight, detect vehicles, and reduce the manpower needed to guide anti-aircraft guns.

== Background ==
In September 1940, a group of British physicists and engineers visited their counterparts in the US in what became known as the Tizard Mission. The goal of the meetings was to exchange technical information that might be of use to the war effort. The British were hesitant to give away too much information without getting anything in return, and initial progress was slow. When they moved onto the topic of radar, the British team was surprised to learn that the US was in the process of developing two systems similar to their own existing Chain Home, the Navy's CXAM and the Army's SCR-270. This began to break the ice between the two groups.

Two previous attempts at radar-controlled gun laying were notable. In Britain, the 75 MHz GL Mk. I radar was used in connection with a Vickers predictor; and in the U.S., the 200 MHz SCR-268 was combined with the Sperry M-4 predictor. Neither the US or UK systems had the accuracy needed to directly lay their associated guns, due to their long wavelengths. The US delegates then mentioned the Navy's work on a 10 cm wavelength radar, which could provide the required resolution with relatively small antennas, but their klystron tube had low power and was not practical.

This was the moment the British team had been waiting for. Edward George Bowen produced one of the earliest cavity magnetrons from a box and showed it to the other researchers. He explained that it also worked at 10 cm wavelength, but offered higher power – not just than the Navy klystrons, but even the US's existing long-wave radars. One US historian later described it as the "most valuable cargo ever brought to our shores".

The potential of the device was obvious, and the US group, informally known as the Microwave Committee, immediately switched their efforts to the magnetron. They had their own examples built in US labs within weeks. They also began developing the other technologies presented at that meeting, including an aircraft interception radar and a radio navigation system that became LORAN. The expansion of the Committee led to it being renamed the Radiation Laboratory (RadLab) in 1940.

== Development ==
A formal proposal for a SCR-268 replacement was made by the Signal Corps in January 1941, by which point the RadLab had already formed what they knew as Project 2 to develop this advanced gun-laying radar. MIT proposed an advanced system with automatic search, tracking and the ability to directly aim the guns. This was a field MIT was particularly knowledgeable in due to work in their Servomechanisms Lab. At the same time, British and Canadian teams began work on versions of a simpler system that they hoped to deploy by 1942 – the GL Mk. III, which was a microwave version of the earlier lobe-switching VHF radar sets. The Radiation Lab kept in close contact with the Canadian team during these developments.

The RadLab team, overseen by Lee Davenport, had a prototype radar system running in April 1941. To test the automatic aiming system, they attached the outputs from the radar to a gun turret taken from a Boeing B-29 bomber, removing the guns and replacing them with a camera. A friend then flew his light plane around the area, while the camera periodically took photographs, and on 31 May the system was able to accurately track the aircraft. Work then started on making the system suitable for field use, mounting the entire system in a single trailer with the 6 ft (1.8 m) antenna on top. Known as XT-1, for experimental truck-1, the system was first tested at Fort Monroe in February 1942.

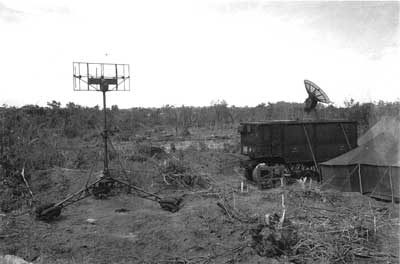
Field deployment of the SCR-584 on Peleliu during World War II. The high elevation angle of the dish combined with a lack of visible activity suggests that the radar is in its helical scan mode.

Work also started on a suitable gun-laying computer that could use electrical, as opposed to mechanical, inputs for pointing data. Bell Labs delivered an analog computer known as the M9 Gun Director for this role. The M9 had four sets of outputs, allowing a single M9 to control four of the Army's standard 90 mm M1 guns. The entire system, including the M9, was demonstrated in complete form on 1 April 1942. A contract for over 1,200 systems arrived the next day. Bell also worked on their own microwave radar as a backup project.

The SCR-584 was extremely advanced for its era. To achieve high accuracy and measure both azimuth and elevation with one antenna, it used a conical scanning system, in which the beam is rotated around the antenna's axis to find the maximum signal point, thus indicating which direction the antenna should move in order to point directly at the target. The idea was proposed by Alfred Loomis, the director of section D-1 of the National Defense Research Committee. In October 1940, it was adopted for the "wholly-automatic-tracking" radar project. Conical scanning was also adopted in 1941 for the Navy's 10 cm fire-control radar system, and it was used in the German Würzburg radar in 1941. The SCR-584 developed the system much further, and added an automatic tracking mode. Once the target had been detected and was within range, the system would keep the radar pointed at the target automatically, driven by motors mounted in the antenna's base. For detection, as opposed to tracking, the system also included a helical scanning mode that allowed it to search for aircraft. This mode had its own dedicated plan position indicator (PPI) display for easy interpretation. When used in this mode, the antenna was mechanically spun at 4 rpm while it was nudged up and down to scan vertically.

The system could be operated at four frequencies between 2,700 and 2,800 MHz (10–11 cm wavelength), sending out 300 kW pulses of 0.8 microseconds in duration with a pulse-repetition frequency (PRF) of 1,707 pulses per second. It could detect bomber-sized targets at about 40 mi (64 km) range and was generally able to automatically track them at about 18 mi (29 km). Accuracy within this range was 25 yd (23 m) in range, and 0.06° (1 mil) in antenna bearing angle (See Table "SCR-584 Technical Characteristics"). Because the electrical beam width was 4° (to the −3 dB or half-power points), the target would be smeared across a portion of a cylinder, so as to be wider in bearing than in range (i.e., on the order of 4°, rather than 0.06° implied by the mechanical pointing accuracy), for distant targets. Range information was displayed on two "J-scopes", similar to the more common A-line display, but arranged in a radial pattern timed to the return delay. One scope was used for coarse range, the other for fine.

== Operational use ==
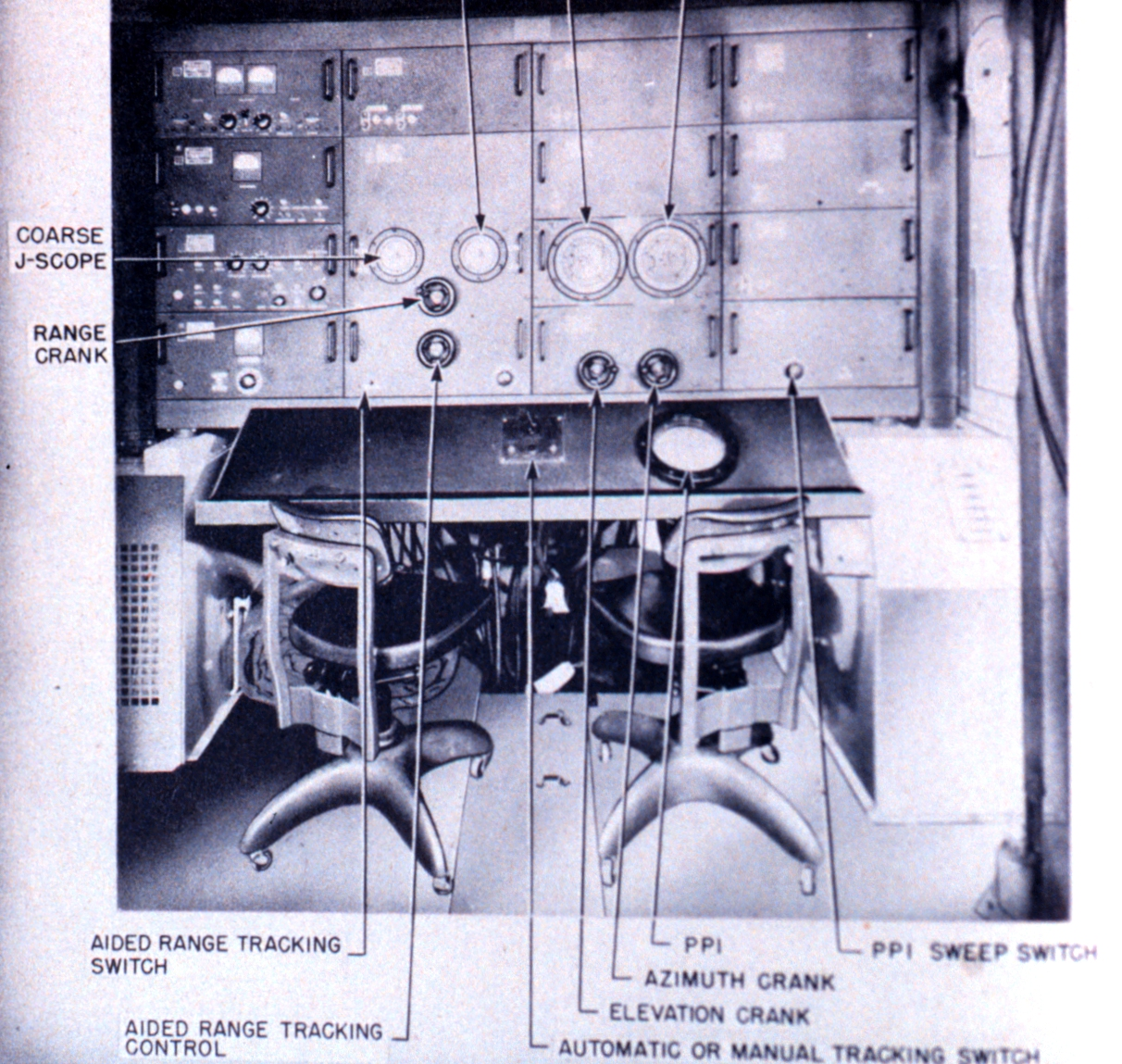
Operators console for the SCR-584

Although the first operational unit was delivered in May 1943, various bureaucratic problems led to delays in deliveries to the front-line troops. The SCR-584 was first used in combat at Anzio in February 1944, where it played a key role in breaking up the Luftwaffe's concentrated air attacks on the confined beachhead. The SCR-584 was no stranger to the front, where it followed the troops, being used to direct aircraft, locate enemy vehicles (one radar is said to have picked up German vehicles at a distance of 26 km (16 mi)), and track the trajectories of artillery shells, both to adjust the ballistic tables for the 90-millimeter guns and to pinpoint the location of German batteries for counter-battery fire. After D-Day, the SCR-584 was used in the rapidly shifting very front lines to guide planes to their targets with increased accuracy. For example, the Control Net Systems Group of the 508th Sq of the 404th Fighter Bomber Group, 9th Air Force ran the SCR-584. From 14 July 1944 until 27 October 1944 they were attached to Sec 1 Co A, 555th Sig Aircraft Warning Battalion and served in fluid, forward positions.

The SCR-584 was so successful that it was adapted for use by the United States Navy. CXBL, a prototype of the navy version, was mounted on the carrier USS Lexington in March 1943, while the production version, the SM, built by General Electric, was operational on the carriers USS Bunker Hill and USS Enterprise by October 1943. A lighter version of the system was also developed, the SCR-784. The only real difference was that the new design weighed 12,000 lb (5,400 kg), whereas the original was 20,000 lb (9,100 kg).

Davenport waterproofed a number of the radar sets so that they could be carried aboard the Allied armada launching the Normandy landings on D-Day.

Automatic gun laying (using, among others, the SCR-584 radar) and the proximity fuze played an important part in Operation Diver (the British operation to counter the V1 flying bombs). Both of these had been requested by AA Command and arrived in numbers, starting in June 1944, just as the guns reached their free-firing positions on the south eastern coast of England. In the first week, 17% of all flying bombs entering the coastal "gun belt" were destroyed by guns on the coast. This rose to 60% by 23 August and 74% in the last week of the month, when on one extraordinary day 82% were shot down. The rate increased from one V-1 for every 2,500 shells fired to one for every 100.

After the war, the radar was adapted for use in the AN/MPQ-12, and AN/MPM-38 systems, a US Army field artillery missile system (MGM-5 Corporal). A modified version was also used to control and beacon-track (using an onboard transponder) the CORONA spy satellite.

In 1953, the SCR-584-Mod II was used for tracking the Redstone rocket, its range extended to 740 km (460 mi) by the use of an onboard transceiver.

== Soviet derivatives ==
American engineer and convicted spy Morton Sobell stole plans for the SCR-584 and provided them to the Soviet Union. Military experts believe that the technology was then used against the United States during the Korean and Vietnam wars. The Soviet SON-9 (Fire Can), SON-30 (Fire Wheel), and SON-50 (Flap Wheel) radars were all derivatives of this radar.

== K-83 dolly ==
General Electric constructed a dolly for the SCR-584, designated K-83. The K-83 was designed to provide a semi-trailer hitch (fifth wheel) wheels and bar to engage a pintle, allowing smaller vehicles to move the SCR-584.

== Civilian use ==
Despite using vacuum tubes and being powered by an analog computer, some specimens of the SCR-584 are still operational today. In 1995 the first Doppler on Wheels (DOW) radar adapted the MP-61 pedestal from an SCR-584 for use in a mobile weather radar. Using this pedestal, the DOWs created the first maps of tornado winds, discovered hurricane boundary layer rolls, and pioneered many other observational studies. The pedestal housed first a 6 ft (1.8 m), then an 8 ft (2.4 m) antenna. Later the original motors were replaced with more powerful brushless versions for faster scanning in high winds. Multiple DOW units are currently operated by the Center for Severe Weather Research (CSWR) as mobile research facilities. Related mobile radar systems, such as the Shared Mobile Atmospheric Research and Teaching Radar (SMART-R), were later developed as independent platforms for atmospheric research. The CSWR, now operating as the Flexible Array of Radars and Mesonets (FARM), maintains several mobile radar platforms, including DOW8, DOW A, DOW B, and COW.

== See also ==
- AN/MPQ-14
- SCR-784
- List of U.S. Signal Corps vehicles
- Signal Corps Radio
- G-numbers
- Gun data computer

== External references ==
- The SCR-584 Radar, Electronics magazine, November 1945 and February 1946
- FM 4-144
- TM 11-1324
- TM 11-1424
- TM 11-1524
- TM 9-2800
- SNL G695 K-83 dolly (adapter)
- SNL G698 K-78 trailer
