= SCR-784 Radar =

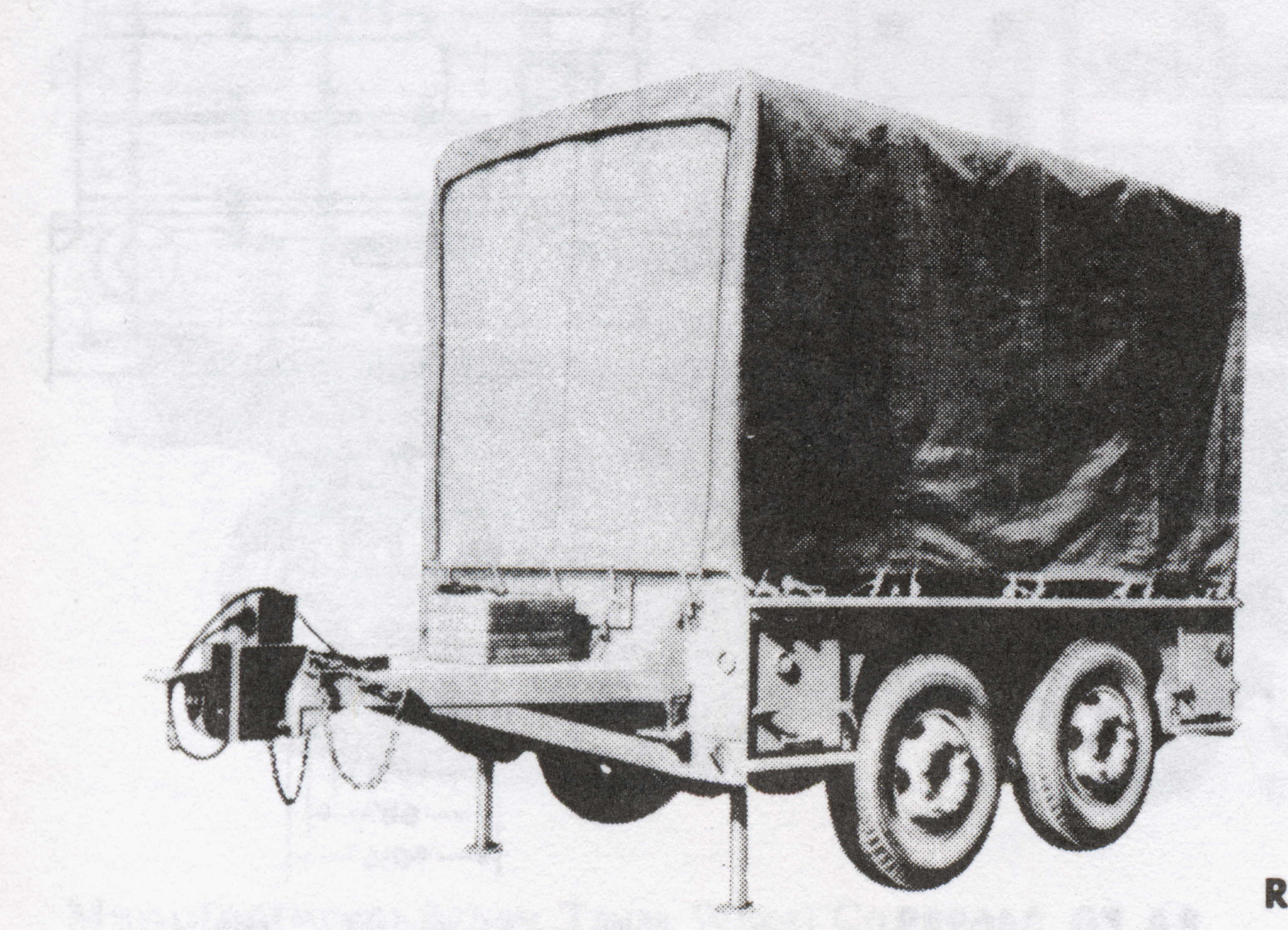
- K84 radar trailer, 1947
- Country of origin: USA
- Type: fire control radar set

The SCR-784 was a radar set used by the U.S. Army. It was a mobile version of the SCR-584, used to control the fire of anti-aircraft batteries, and mounted on a searchlight trailer called a K-84. The set was used to guide the flare plane over the target.

== Statistics ==
Frequency: 2,800 MHz
Pulse Width: 0.8 μs
Pulse Repetition Rate: 1707 pps
Vertical Coverage: 300 to 10,000 yards (270 to 9,140 m)
Indicator Type: display 7 inch PPI and, two 3 inch CRT's for range determination

== K-84 trailer ==
- built by Fruehauf Trailer Corporation
- Gross Weight is 13,165 pounds (5,972 kg).
- Tires are 9.00 X 20. 10 Ply.
- Electric brakes, and parking brake.
- Overall length 220-3/8"
- Overall width 97-3/4"

== Surviving examples ==
There are no known surviving examples of this array.

== See also ==
- List of U.S. Signal Corps Vehicles
- Signal Corps Radio
- G-numbers
