= Primary radar =

Type of conventional radar sensor

Principle of primary radar

A primary radar or primary surveillance radar (PSR) is a conventional radar sensor that illuminates a large portion of space with electromagnetic waves and detects the waves reflected back from targets within that space. The term thus refers to a radar system that can detect and localize potentially non-cooperative targets. It is specific to the field of air traffic control where it is distinguished from secondary radar which receives additional information from the target's transponder.

This type of radar uses a low vertical resolution antenna that has good horizontal resolution. It quickly scans 360 degrees around the site at a single elevation angle. It can thus give the distance and radial speed of the target with good precision but often requires one or more radars to obtain accurate vertical position and actual speed.

The advantages of the primary radar are that no equipment on-board the aircraft is necessary for detecting the target and it can be used to monitor the movement of vehicles on the ground. The disadvantages are that the target and altitude can not be identified directly. In addition, it requires powerful emissions which limits its scope.

== Description ==
Primary radar operation is based on the principle of echolocation. Electromagnetic pulses of high power emitted by the radar antenna are converted into a narrow wavefront which propagates at the speed of light (300 000 km/s). This is reflected by the aircraft and then picked up again by the rotating antenna on its own axis. A primary radar detects all aircraft without selection, regardless of whether or not they possess a transponder.

The operator hears the echoes from any reflection. Therefore, it performs transmission/listening continuously, which covers the space 360 °. The primary radar functions, therefore, results in detection and measurements of position if there is the presence of a target by the recognition of the useful signal.

A primary radar measurement include:

- the distance D based on the wave transit time on the path to / from;
- an angle θ based on the position of a directional antenna in azimuth;
- radial velocity using the Doppler effect.

It can be said that a radar locates a flying object on a quarter circle in the vertical plane, but cannot know exactly its altitude if it is using a fan-beam antenna. This information must be obtained by triangulation of several radars in that case. However, with a 3D radar this data is obtained by using either a cosecant squared pattern or a scanning on multiple angles with a pencil beam.

== Usage ==
The rapid wartime development of radar had obvious applications for air traffic control (ATC) as a means of providing continuous surveillance of air traffic disposition. Precise knowledge of the positions of aircraft would permit a reduction in the normal procedural separation standards, which in turn promised considerable increases in the efficiency of the airways system.

This type of radar (now called a primary radar) can detect and report the position of anything that reflects its transmitted radio signals including, depending on its design, aircraft, birds, weather and land features. For air traffic control purposes this is both an advantage and a disadvantage. Its targets do not have to co-operate, they only have to be within its coverage and be able to reflect radio waves, but it only indicates the position of the targets, it does not identify them.

When primary radar was the only type of radar available, the correlation of individual radar returns with specific aircraft typically was achieved by the controller observing a directed turn by the aircraft. Primary radar is still used by ATC as a backup/complementary system to secondary radar, although its coverage and information is more limited.

== Regulations ==
A Radar is, according to article 1.101 of the International Telecommunication Union's (ITU) ITU Radio Regulations (RR), defined as:

A radiodetermination system based on the comparison of reference signals with radio signals reflected from the position to be determined. Each radiodetermination system shall be classified by the radiocommunication service in which it operates permanently or temporarily. Typical radar utilizations might operate in the radiolocation service or the radiolocation-satellite service.

== References / sources ==
- International Telecommunication Union (ITU)
