= List of United States Army tactical truck engines =

In the late 1930s the US Army began setting requirements for custom built tactical trucks, winning designs would be built in quantity. As demand increased during WWII some standardized designs were built by other manufactures.

Most trucks had gasoline (G) engines until the early 1960s, when multifuel (M) and diesel (D) engines were introduced. Since then diesel fuel has increasingly been used, the last gasoline engine vehicles were built in 1985.

Most engines have been water-cooled with inline (I) cylinders, but V types (V) and opposed (O) engines have also been used. Three air-cooled engines were used in two very light trucks. Gasoline engines up to WWII were often valve in block design (L-head), during the war more overhead valve (ohv) engines were used, and after the war all new engines (except 1 F-head and 1 Overhead camshaft (ohc)) have been ohv. All diesel engines have ohv, they can be naturally aspired, supercharged (SC), or turbocharged (TC).

The same engines have been used in different trucks, and larger trucks often have had different engines during their service life. Because of application and evolution, the same engine often has different power ratings. Ratings are in SAE gross horsepower.

The front of an engine is the fan end, the rear is the flywheel end, right and left are as viewed from the rear, regardless of how the engine is mounted in the vehicle. Engines in the tables are water-cooled and naturally aspirated unless noted.

== AM General/Kaiser Jeep/Willys ==
Model	Displacement	Fuel	Type	Power	Torque	Used in
AO-42 (Note: Army Ordnance design built by AM General and Continental)	53 cu in (0.9 L)	G	AC O4	16 hp (12 kW) @3200rpm	30 lbf⋅ft (41 N⋅m) @2100rpm	M274 1/2-ton 4x4 "Mule"
AV-108-4	108 cu in (1.8 L)	G	AC V4	54 hp (40 kW) @3600rpm	90 lbf⋅ft (122 N⋅m) @2500rpm	M422 1/4 4x4 "Mity Mite"
MB	134 cu in (2.2 L)	G	I4	54 hp (40 kW) @4000rpm	105 lbf⋅ft (142 N⋅m)	Willys MB/Ford GPW 1/4-ton 4x4 "Jeep"
MD	134 cu in (2.2 L)	G	I4	72 hp (54 kW) @4000rpm	114 lbf⋅ft (155 N⋅m) @2000rpm	M38A1 1/4-ton 4x4
Tornado	230 cu in (3.8 L)	G	I6	132 hp (98 kW) @4000	198 lbf⋅ft (268 N⋅m) @2000rpm	M715 1 1/4-ton 4x4

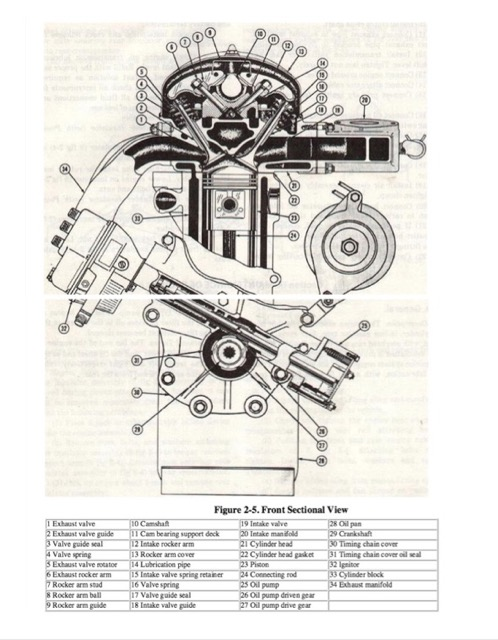
Kaiser-Jeep Tornado
(front cutaway)

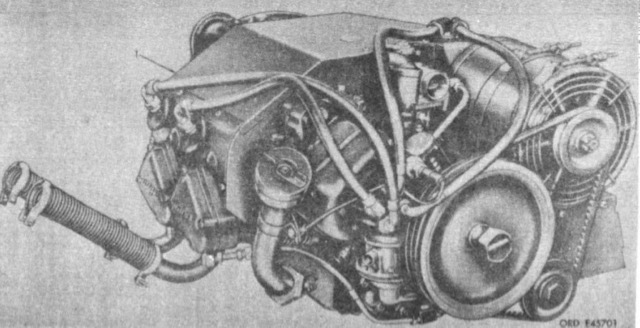
Willys AO4-53

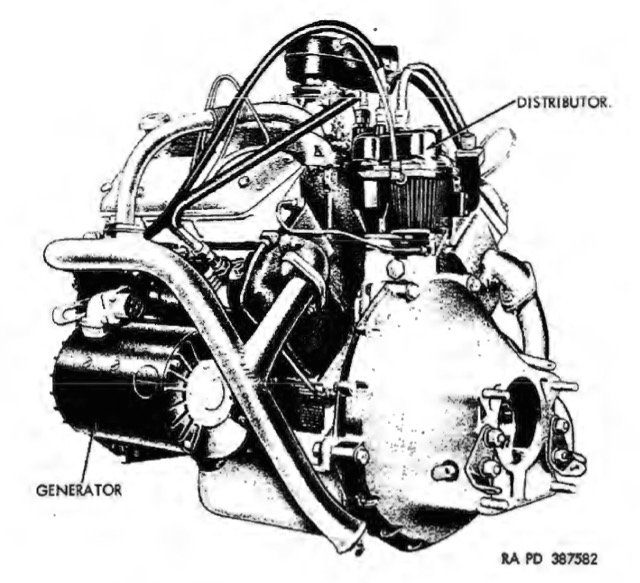
American Motors AV-108-4
(left rear)

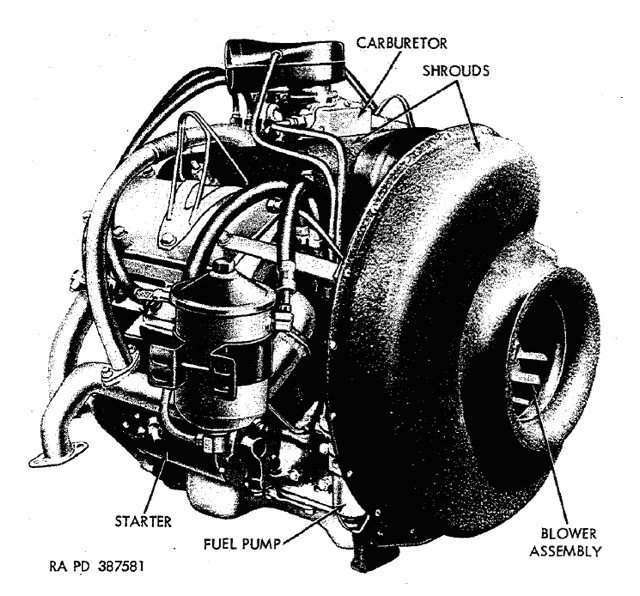
American Motors AV-108-4
(right front)

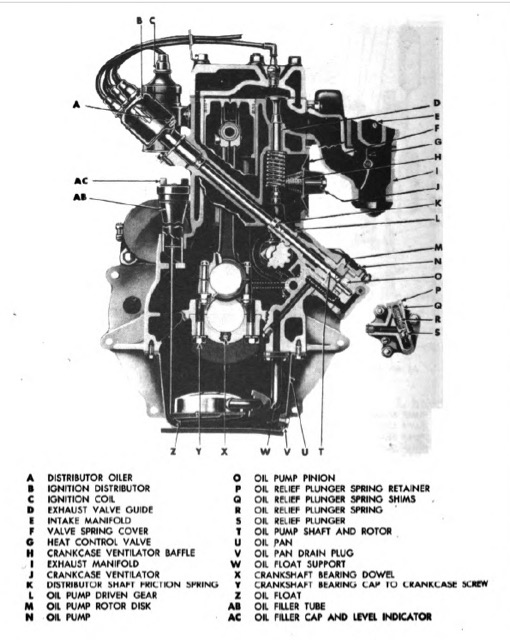
Willys MB
(front cutaway)

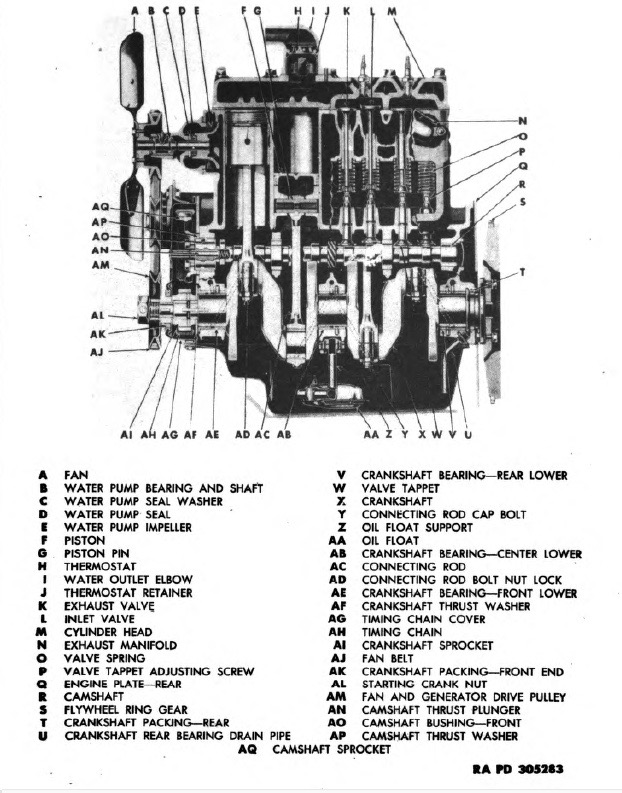
Willys MB
(left side cutaway)

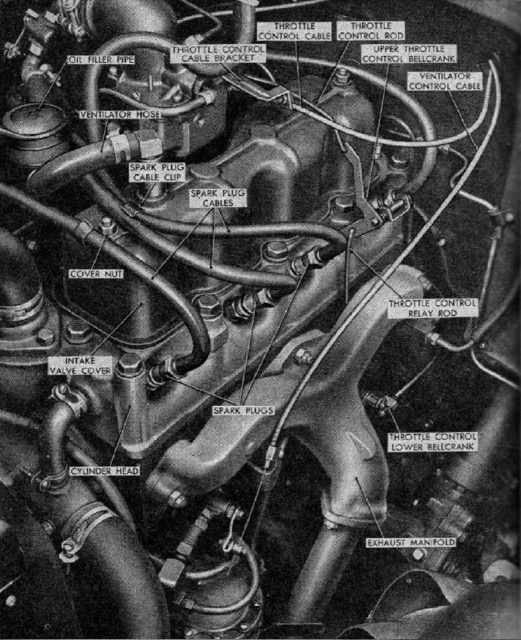
Willys MD
(left front)

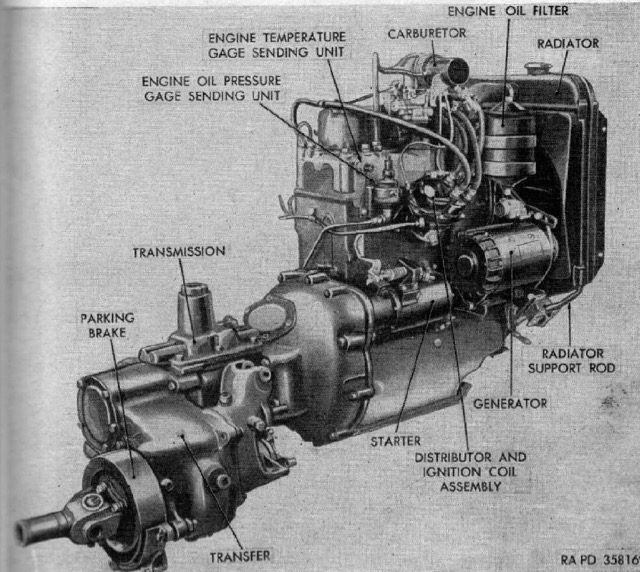
Willys MD
(right rear)

== Caterpillar ==
Model	Displacement	Fuel	Type	Power	Torque	Used in
3116	403 cu in (6.6 L)	D	TC I6	225 hp (168 kW)	430 lbf⋅ft (583 N⋅m) @1550rpm	M35A3 2 1/2-ton 6x6, Family of Medium Tactical Vehicles
C7	439 cu in (7.2 L)	D	TC I6	330 hp (246 kW) @2400rpm	860 lbf⋅ft (1,166 N⋅m) @1400rpm	Family of Medium Tactical Vehicles
C15	928 cu in (15.2 L)	D	TC I6	515 hp (384 kW) @1800rpm	1,650 lbf⋅ft (2,237 N⋅m) @1200rpm	M977 (HEMTT), M1074/M1075 (PLS)
C18	1,106 cu in (18.1 L)	D	TC I6	700 hp (522 kW) @1300rpm	1,900 lbf⋅ft (2,576 N⋅m) @1400	M1070A1 (HET)

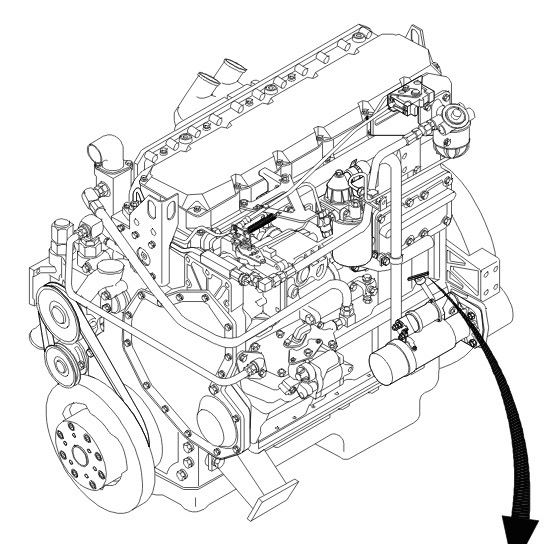
Caterpillar 3116 (left front)

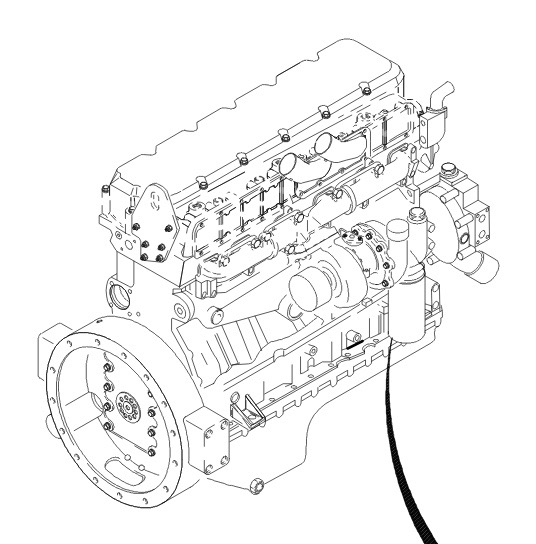
Caterpillar 3116 (right rear)

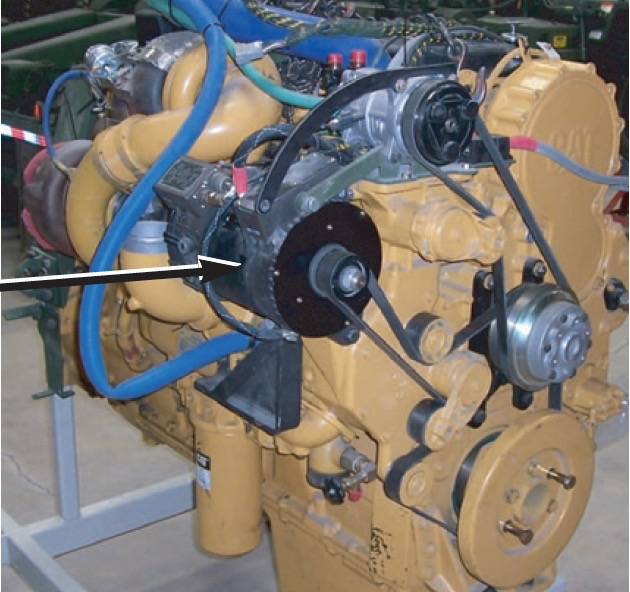
Caterpillar C15

== Chevrolet – GMC ==
Model	Displacement	Fuel	Type	Power	Torque	Used in
6.2L/6.5L	400 cu in (6.6 L)	D	V8	160 hp (119 kW) @3400rpm	240 lbf⋅ft (325 N⋅m) @2000rpm	M1008 1 1/4-ton 4x4 (CUCV), M998 1 1/4-ton 4x4 (HMMWV)
270	270 cu in (4.4 L)	G	I6	91 hp (68 kW) @2750rpm	216 lbf⋅ft (293 N⋅m) @1400rpm	GMC CCKW 2 1/2-ton 6x6, DUKW 2 1/2-ton 6x6 amphibian
302	302 cu in (4.9 L)	G	I6	130 hp (97 kW) @3200rpm	262 lbf⋅ft (355 N⋅m) @1200rpm	M135 2 1/2-ton 6x6
BV-1001	235 cu in (3.9 L)	G	I6	83 hp (62 kW) @3100rpm	184 lbf⋅ft (249 N⋅m) @1000rpm	Chev. G506 1 1/2-ton 4x4

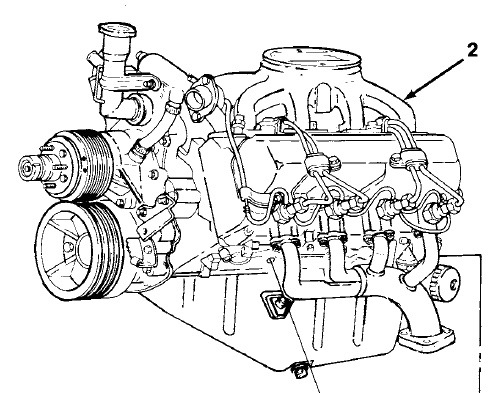
Chevrolet 6.2/6.5L

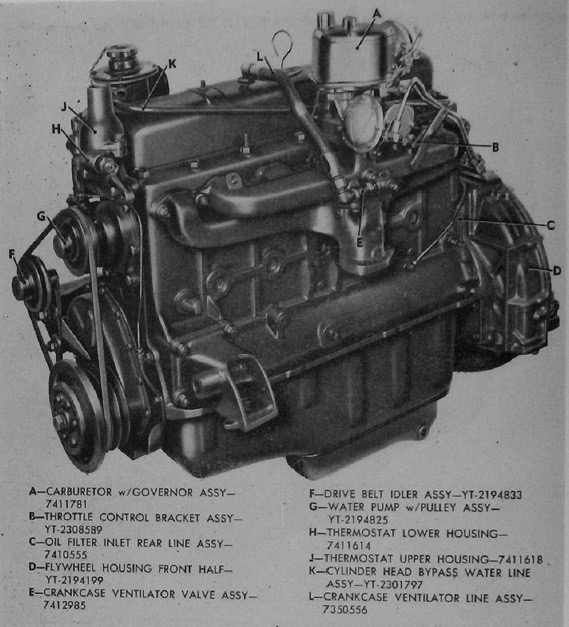
GMC 302
(left front)

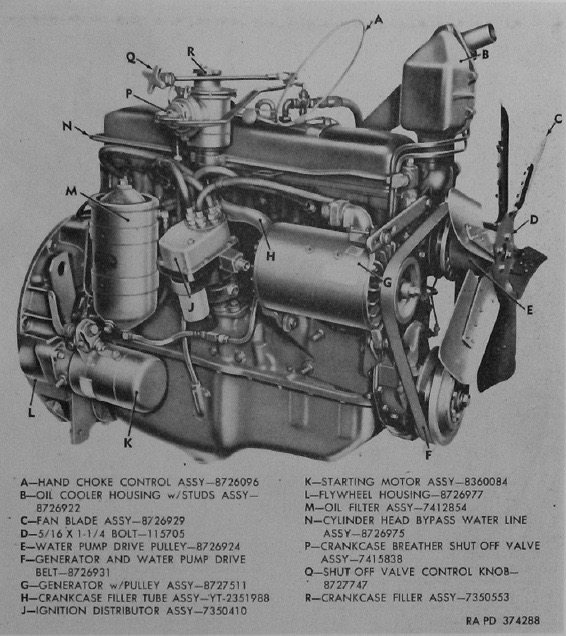
GMC 302
(right front)

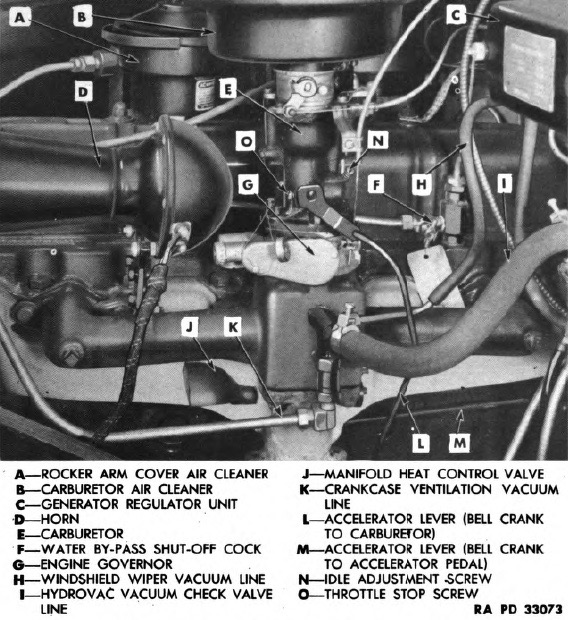
Chevrolet BV-1001
(left side)

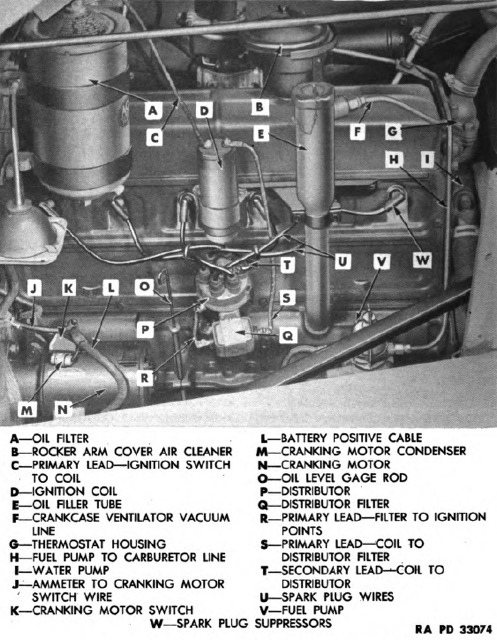
Chevrolet BV-1001
(right side)

== Continental ==
Model	Displacement	Fuel	Type	Power	Torque	Used in
AO42	42 cu in (0.7 L)	G	AC O2	13 hp (10 kW) @3000rpm	26 lbf⋅ft (35 N⋅m) @2300rpm	M274 1/2-ton 4x4 "Mule"
L-142 (Note: Army Ordnance design built by Continental and Hercules/White.)	1,412 cu in (23.1 L)	G	I4	65 hp (48 kW) @4000rpm	128 lbf⋅ft (174 N⋅m) @1800rpm	M151 1/4-ton 4x4
LDT465	478 cu in (7.8 L)	M	TC I6	130 hp (97 kW)	305 lbf⋅ft (414 N⋅m)	M35 2 1/2-ton 6x6, M54 5-ton 6x6, M656 5-ton 8x8
R22	501 cu in (8.2 L)	G	I6	145 hp (108 kW) @2400rpm	372 lbf⋅ft (504 N⋅m) @1200rpm	M1 10-ton 6x6 Wrecker
R6602	602 cu in (9.9 L)	G	I6	224 hp (167 kW) @2800rpm	504 lbf⋅ft (683 N⋅m) @1200rpm	M54 5-ton 6x6

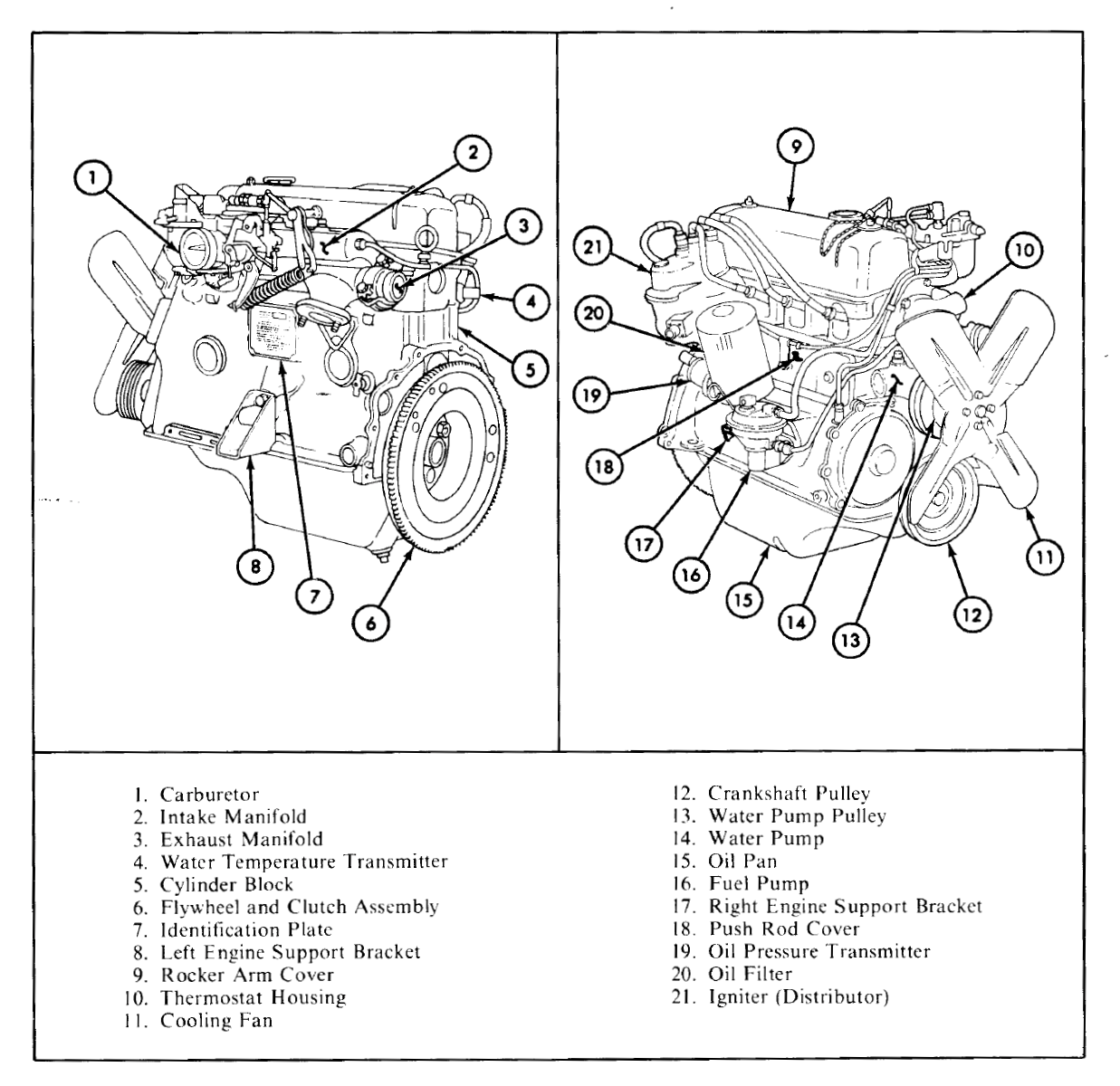
Ordnance design L-142

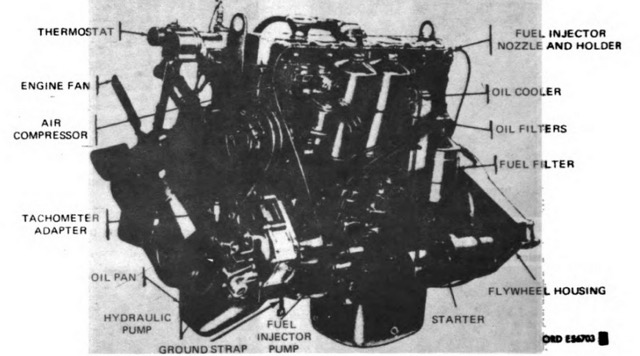
Ordnance design LDT-465
(left front)

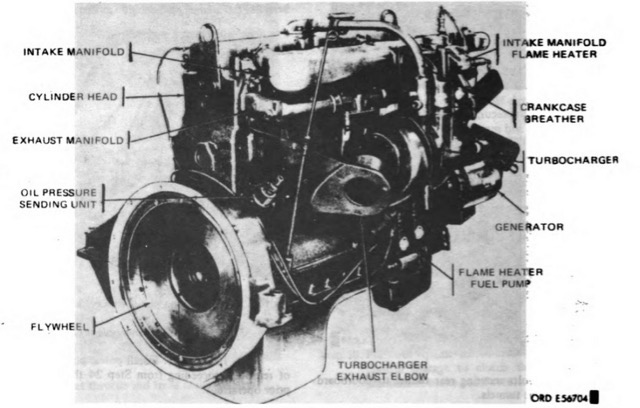
Ordnance design LDT-465
(right rear)

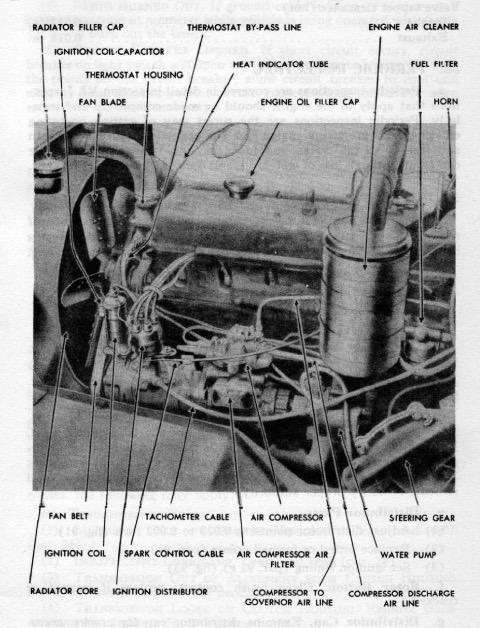
Continental R22
(left side)

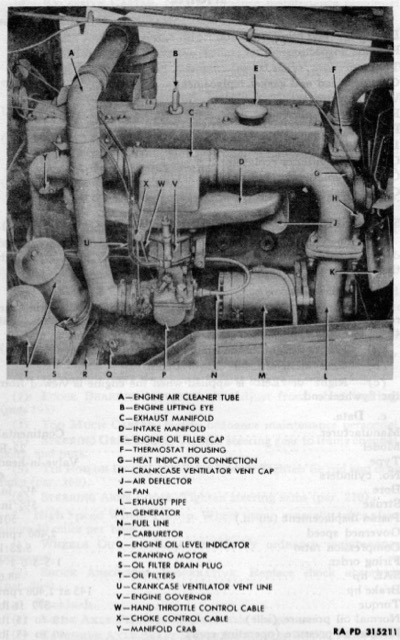
Continental R22
(right side)

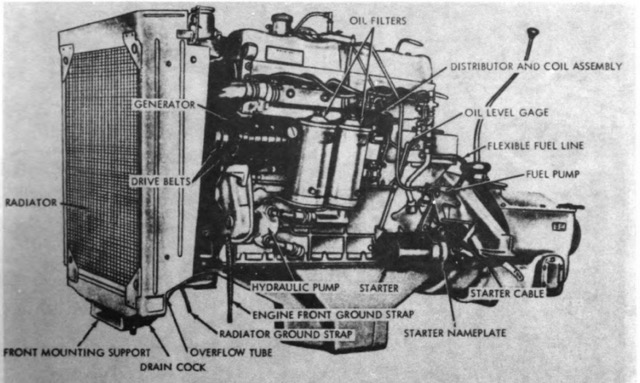
Continental R6602
(left side)

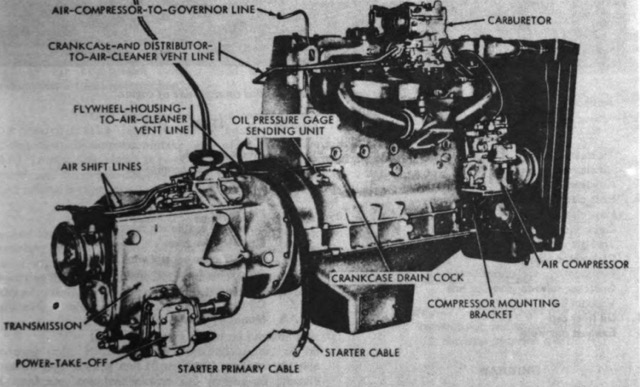
Continental R6602
(right side)

== Cummins ==
Model	Displacement	Fuel	Type	Power	Torque	Used in
6CTA8.3	504 cu in (8.3 L)	D	TC I6	240 hp (179 kW) @2100rpm	745 lbf⋅ft (1,010 N⋅m) @1500rpm	M939 5-ton 6x6
NH250	855 cu in (14.0 L)	D	I6	240 hp (179 kW) @2100rpm	685 lbf⋅ft (929 N⋅m) @1500rpm	M809 5-ton 6x6), M939 5-ton 6x6
NTC400	855 cu in (14.0 L)	D	TC I6	400 hp (298 kW) @2100rpm	1,150 lbf⋅ft (1,559 N⋅m) @1500rpm	M915 series 6x4, 6x6, 8x6
V8-300	785 cu in (12.9 L)	D	V8	300 hp (224 kW) @3000rpm	580 lbf⋅ft (786 N⋅m) @2100rpm	M123/125 10-ton 6x6

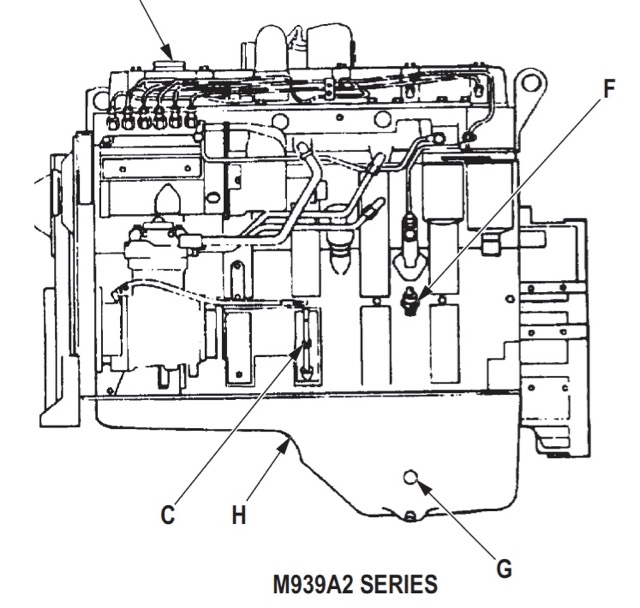
Cummins 6CTA8.3
(left side)

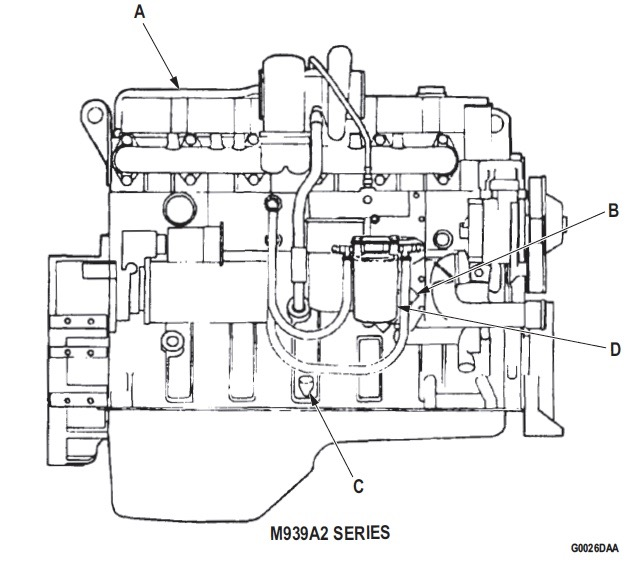
Cummins 6CTA8.3
(right side)

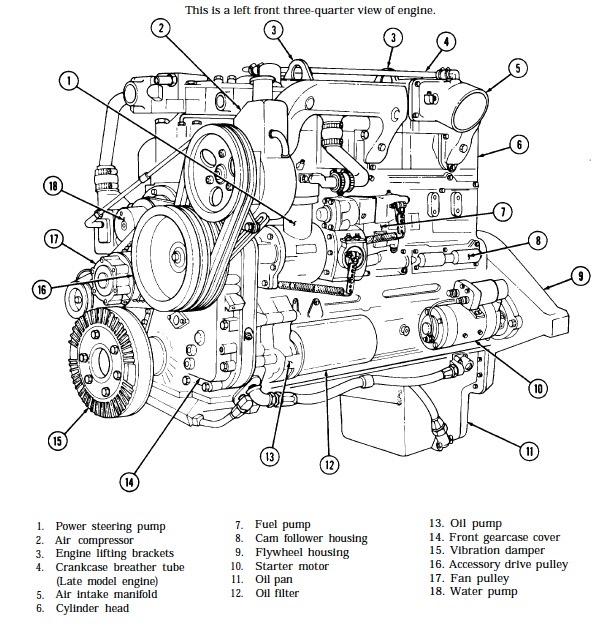
Cummins NH250
(left front)

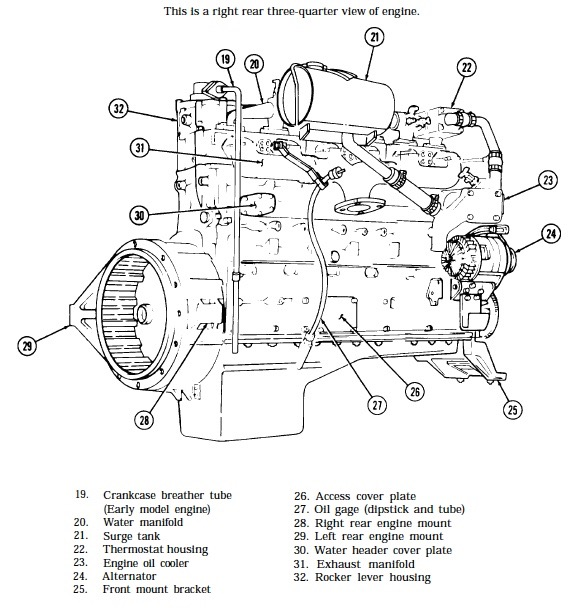
Cummins NH250
(right rear)

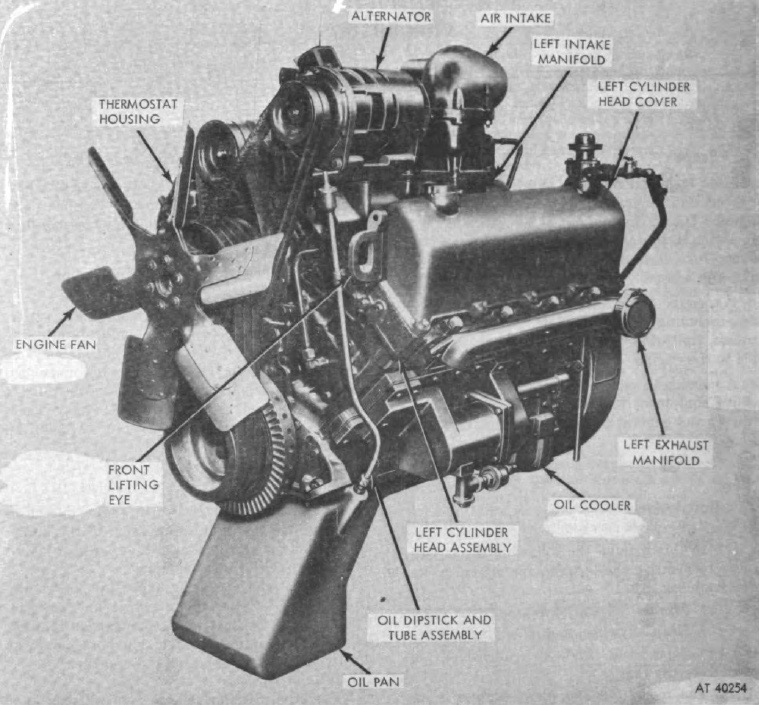
Cummins V8-300
(left front)

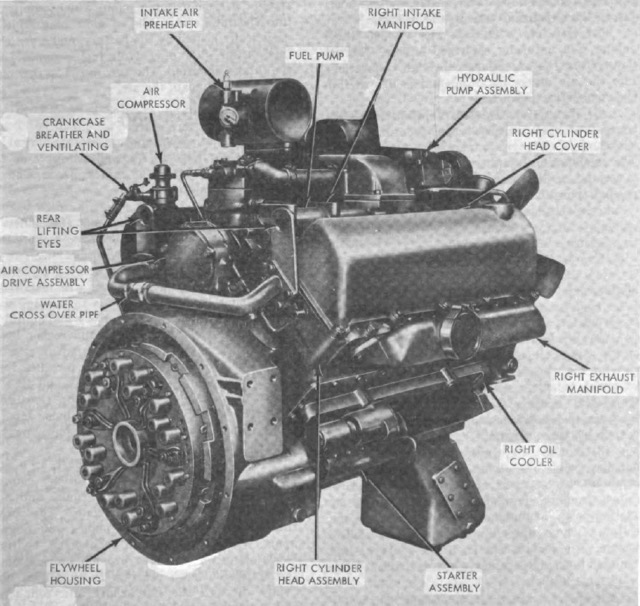
Cummins V8-300
(right rear)

== Detroit Diesel ==
Model	Displacement	Fuel	Type	Power	Torque	Used in
3-53	159 cu in (2.6 L)	D	SC I3	103 hp (77 kW) @2800rpm	217 lbf⋅ft (294 N⋅m) @1500rpm	M561 1 1/2-ton 6x6 "Gamma-goat"
Series 60	775 cu in (12.7 L)	D	TC I6	400 hp (298 kW) @2100rpm	1,400 lbf⋅ft (1,898 N⋅m) @1200rpm	M915 series 6x4, 6x6, 8x6
8V92TA	736 cu in (12.1 L)	D	TC V8	450 hp (336 kW)	1,330 lbf⋅ft (1,803 N⋅m) @1200rpm	M911(C-HET) M977(HEMTT), M1070(HET)
12V71	852 cu in (14.0 L)	D	SC V12	600 hp (447 kW) @2500rpm	1,470 lbf⋅ft (1,993 N⋅m) @16000rpm	M746 22 1/2-ton 8x8 (HET)

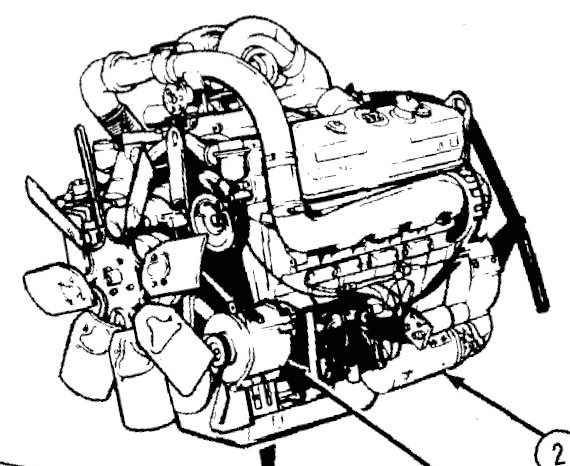
Detroit Diesel 8V92TA

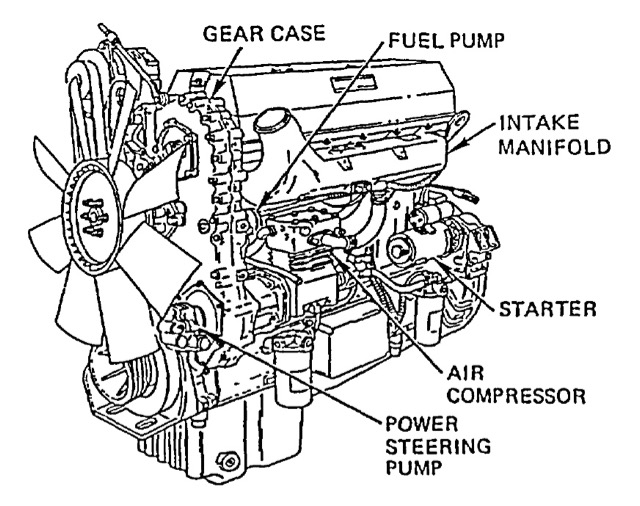
Detroit Diesel Series 60 (left front)

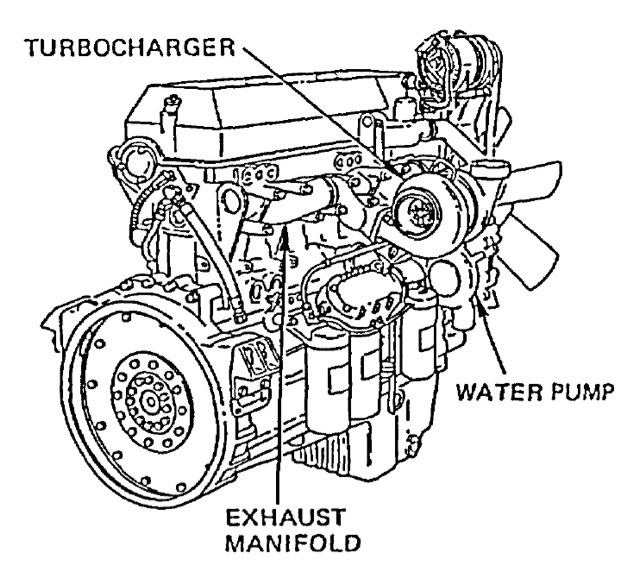
Detroit Diesel Series 60 (right rear)

== Dodge-Fargo ==
Model	Displacement	Fuel	Type	Power	Torque	Used in
T-202	201 cu in (3.3 L)	G	I6	79 hp (59 kW) @3000rpm		VC 1/2-ton 4x4
T-214-245	230 cu in (3.8 L)	G	I6	92 hp (69 kW) @3200	180 lbf⋅ft (244 N⋅m) @1200rpm	Dodge WC 3/4-ton 4x4, M37 3/4-ton 4x4
318	318 cu in (5.2 L)	G	V8	150 hp (112 kW) @4000rpm	230 lbf⋅ft (312 N⋅m) @2400rpm	M880 1 1/4-ton 4x4 (CUCV)

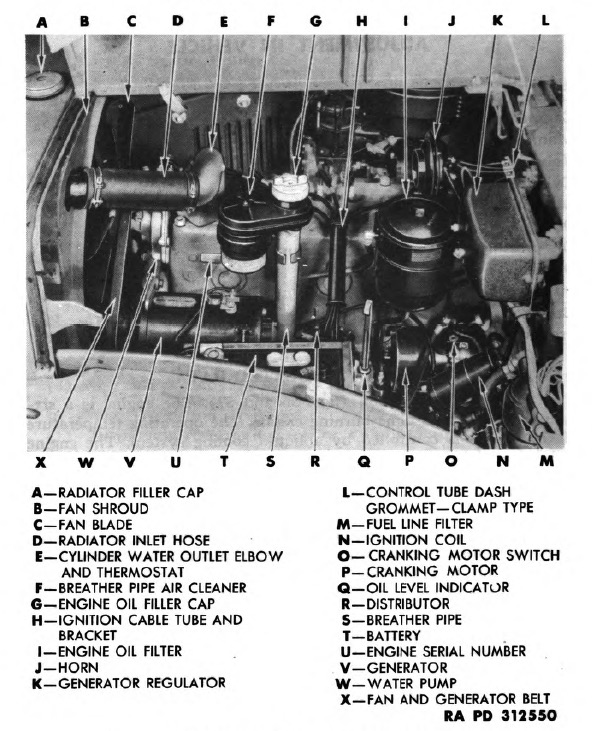
Dodge T214 (left side)

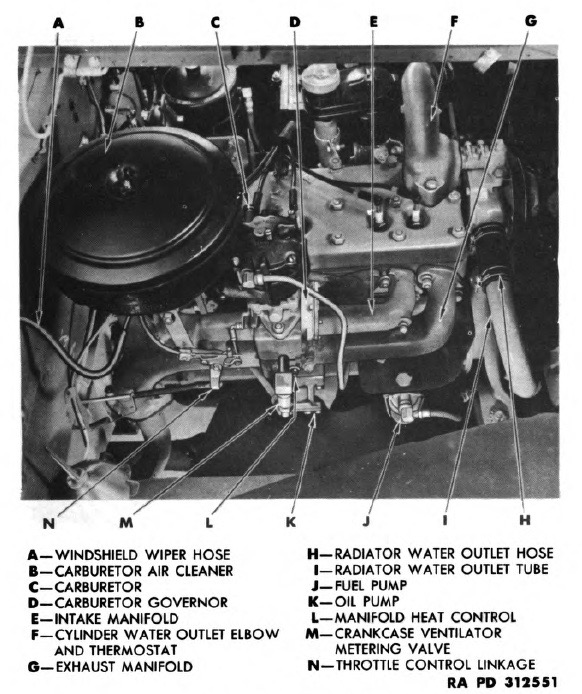
Dodge T214 (right side)

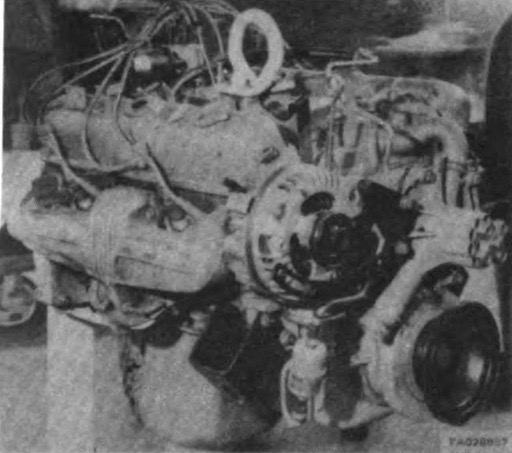
Dodge 318

== Ford ==
Model	Displacement	Fuel	Type	Power	Torque	Used in
GTB	226 cu in (3.7 L)	G	I6	90 hp (67 kW) @3000rpm	180 lbf⋅ft (244 N⋅m) @1200rpm	1 1/2-ton 4x4

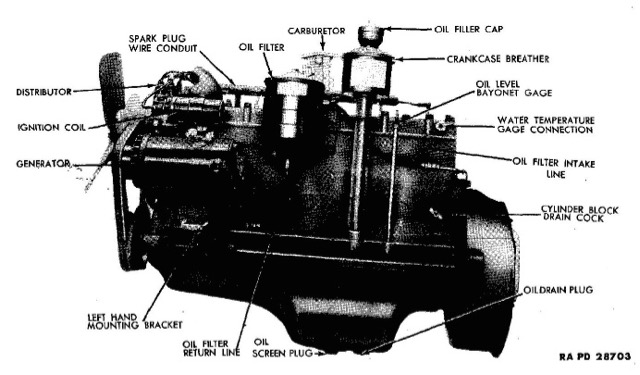
Ford GTB (left side)

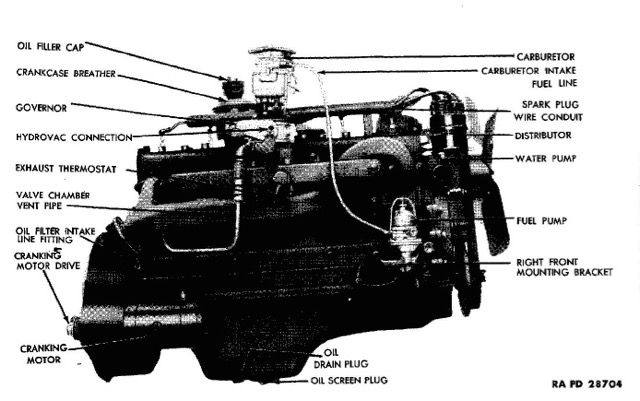
Ford GTB (right side)

== Hall-Scott ==
Model	Displacement	Fuel	Type	Power	Torque	Used in
440	1,090 cu in (17.9 L)	G	I6	240 hp (179 kW) @2000rpm	810 lbf⋅ft (1,098 N⋅m) @1200rpm	M25 tank transporter

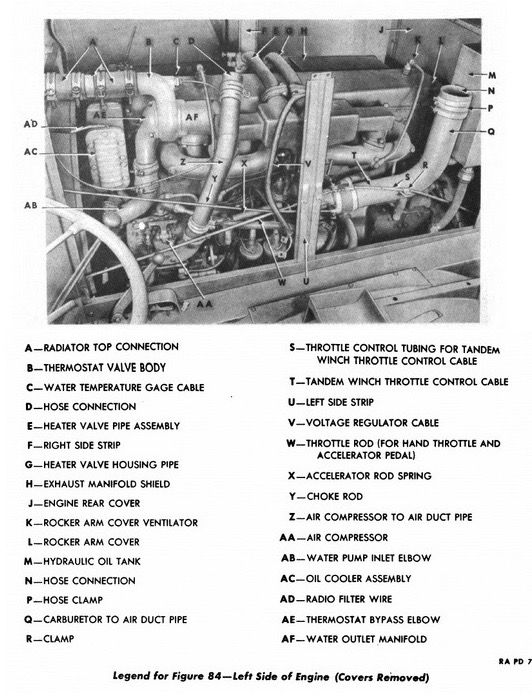
Hall-Scott 440 (left side)

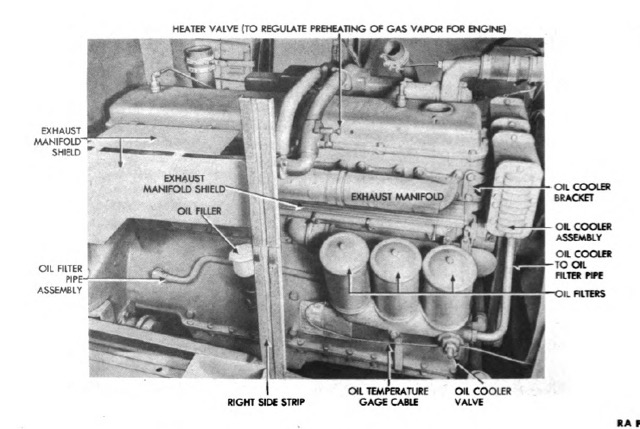
Hall-Scott 440 (right side)

== Hercules ==
Model	Displacement	Fuel	Type	Power	Torque	Used in
DFXE	895 cu in (14.7 L)	D	I6	185 hp (138 kW) @1600rpm	665 lbf⋅ft (902 N⋅m) @1200rpm	M19 tank transporter
HXD	disp855 cu in (14.0 L)	G	I6	202 hp (151 kW) @2150rpm	642 lbf⋅ft (870 N⋅m) @900rpm	6-ton 6x6)
JXD	320 cu in (5.2 L)	G	I6	87 hp (65 kW) @2400rpm	228 lbf⋅ft (309 N⋅m) @1200rpm	US6 2 1/2-ton 6x6
L-142	1,412 cu in (23.1 L)	G	I4	65 hp (48 kW) @4000rpm	128 lbf⋅ft (174 N⋅m) @1800rpm	M151 1/4-ton 4x4
LDT465	478 cu in (7.8 L)	M	TC I6	130 hp (97 kW)	305 lbf⋅ft (414 N⋅m)	M35 2 1/2-ton 6x6, M54 5-ton 6x6, M656 5-ton 8x8
RXC	529 cu in (8.7 L)	G	I6	131 hp (98 kW) @2200	369 lbf⋅ft (500 N⋅m) @1000rpm	Diamond T 4-ton 6x6, Autocar U8144T 5-/6-ton 4x4

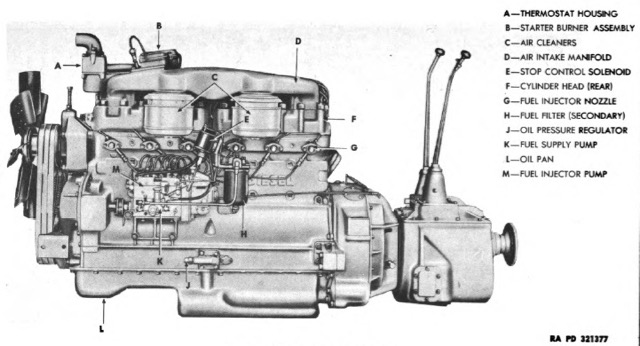
Hercules DFXE (left side)

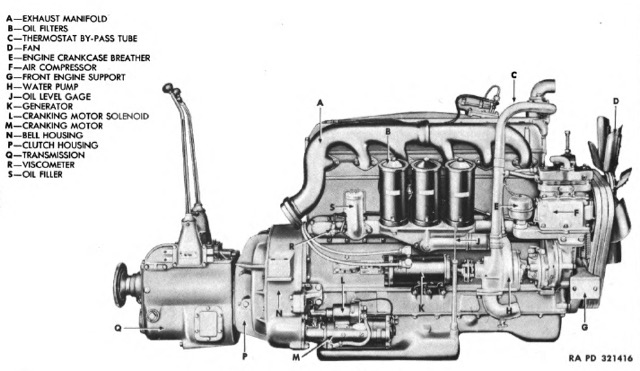
Hercules DFXE (right side)

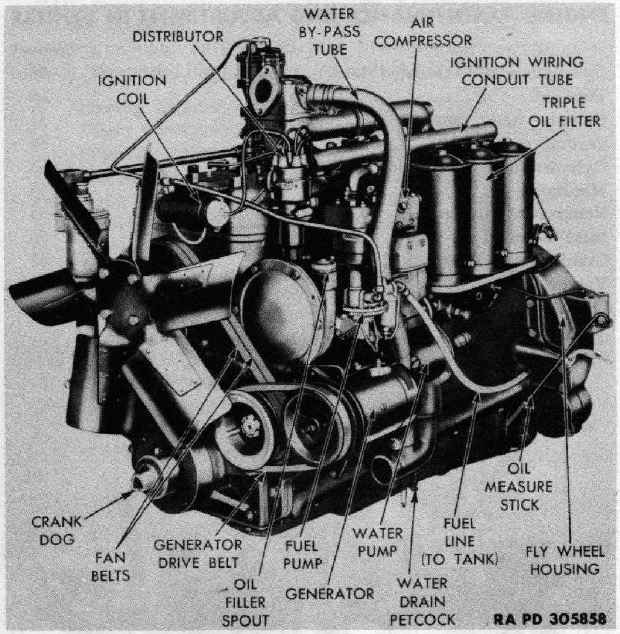
Hercules HXD (left front)

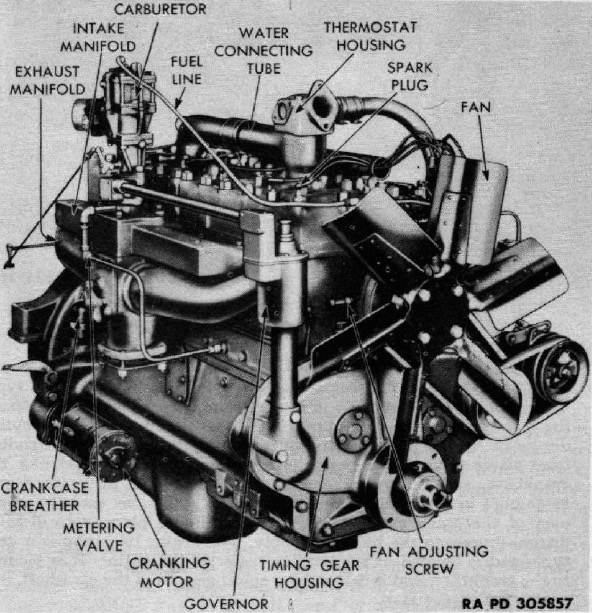
Hercules HXD (right front)

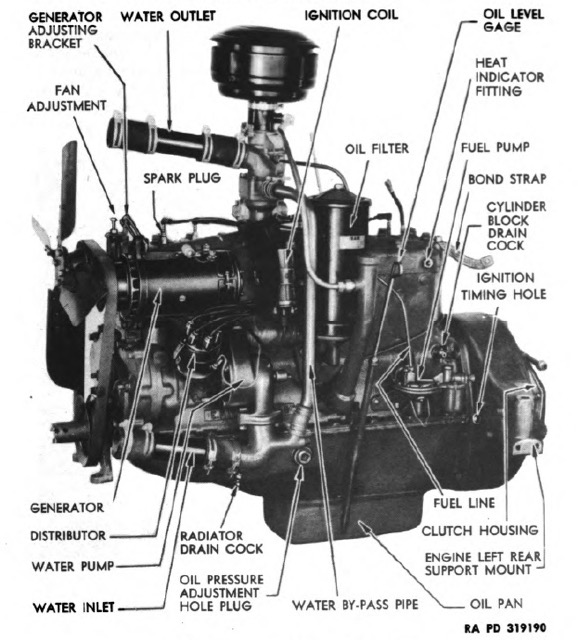
Hercules JXD (left side)

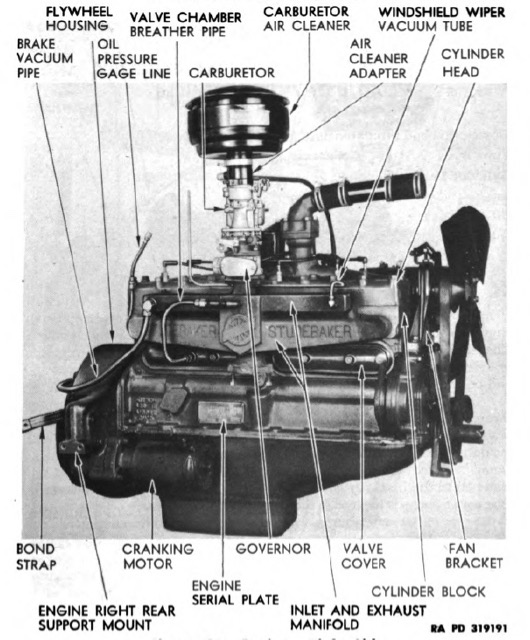
Hercules JXD (right side)

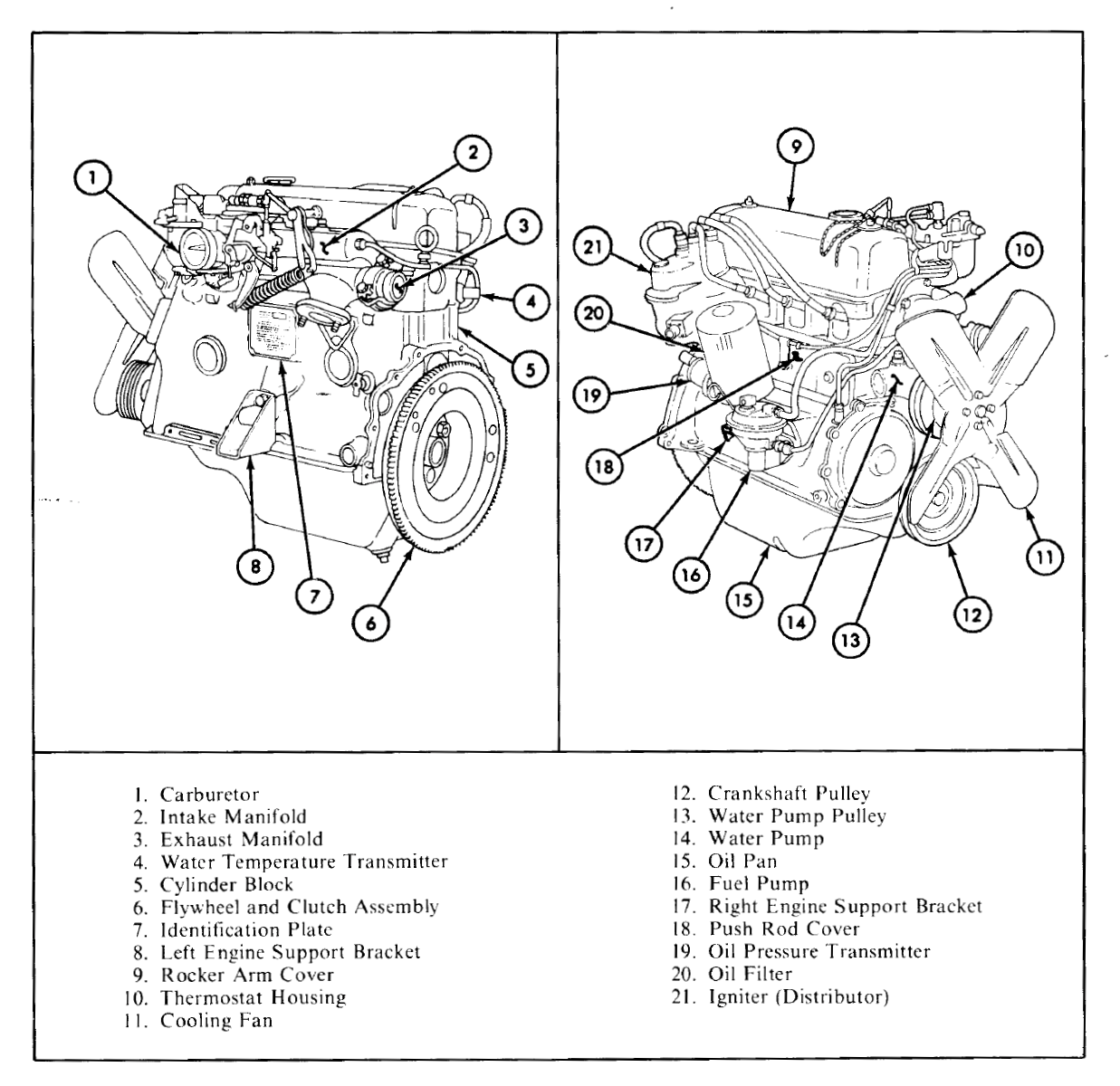
Hercules L-142

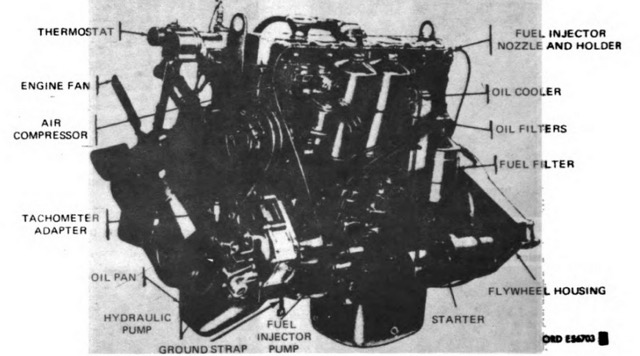
Ordnance design LDT-465
(left front)

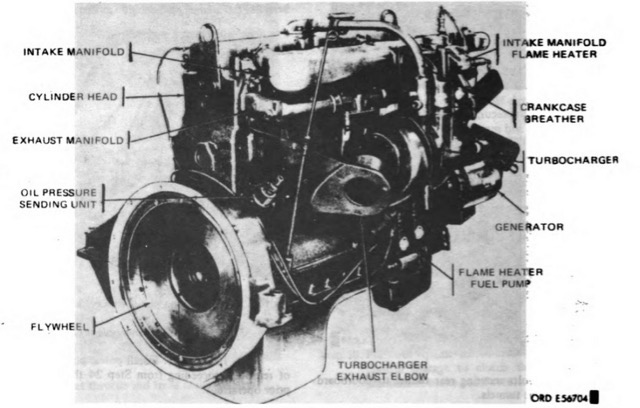
Ordnance design LDT-465
(right rear)

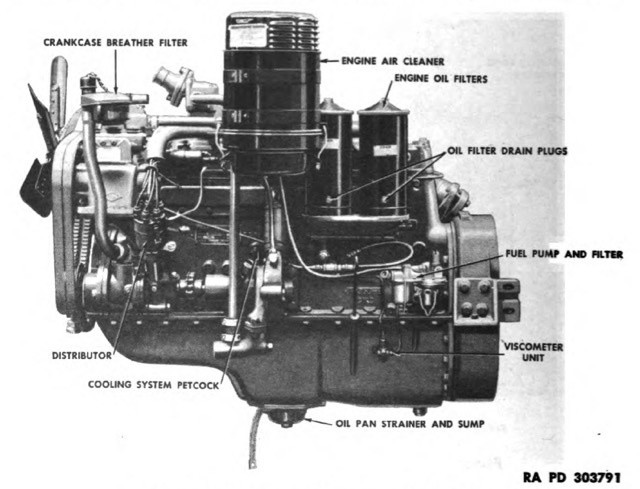
Hercules RXC (left side)

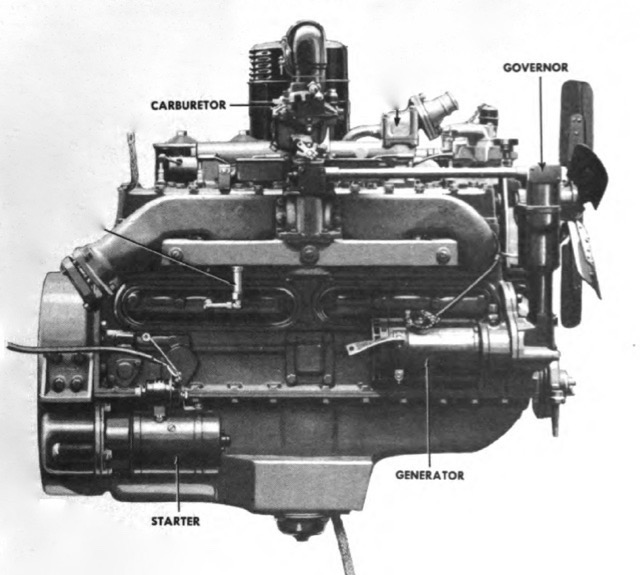
Hercules RXC (right side)

== International Harvester ==
Model	Displacement	Fuel	Type	Power	Torque	Used in
GRD-214	214 cu in (3.5 L)	G	I6	85 hp (63 kW) @3400rpm	160 lbf⋅ft (217 N⋅m) @1200	IHC M-1-4 1/2-ton 4x4
GRD-233	233 cu in (3.8 L)	G	I6	93 hp (69 kW) @3400	181 lbf⋅ft (245 N⋅m) @800	IHC M-1-4 1/2-ton 4x4, IHC M-5-6 1 1/2-ton 6x6

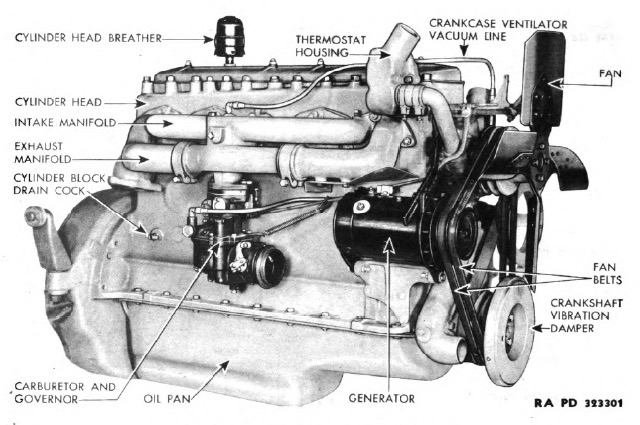
International RED-450-D

== LeRoi ==
Model	Displacement	Fuel	Type	Power	Torque	Used in
T-H844	844 cu in (13.8 L)	G	V8	297 hp (221 kW) @2600rpm	725 lbf⋅ft (983 N⋅m) @1700rpm	M123/25 10-ton 6x6

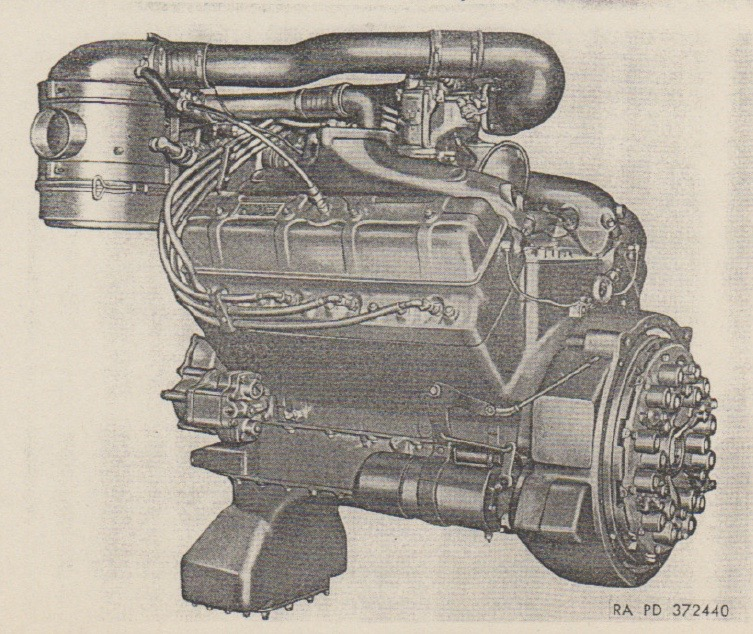
LeRoi T-H844 (left rear)

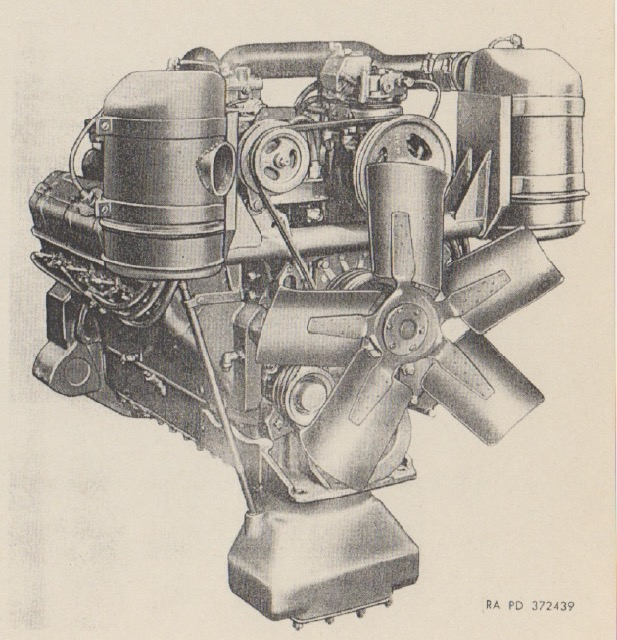
LeRoi T-H844 (right front)

== Mack ==
Model	Displacement	Fuel	Type	Power	Torque	Used
EN532	532 cu in (8.7 L)	G	I6	136 hp (101 kW) @2400rpm		Mack NJU 5-ton 6x6
EY	707 cu in (11.6 L)	G	I6	159 hp (119 kW) @2100rpm	530 lbf⋅ft (719 N⋅m) @800rpm	Mack NM-6 6-ton 6x6, Mack NO 7 1/2-ton 6x6
ENDT673	672 cu in (11.0 L)	D	TC I6	211 hp (157 kW) @2100rpm	610 lbf⋅ft (827 N⋅m)	M54 5-ton 6x6)

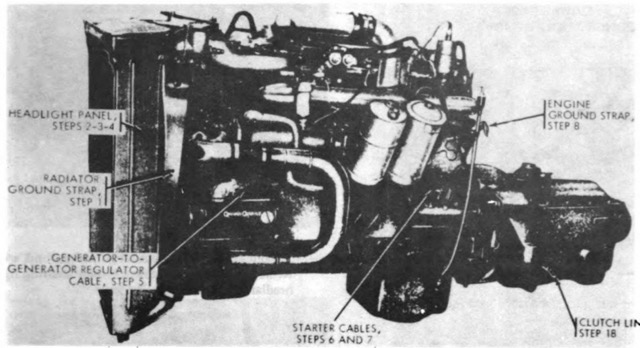
Mack ENDT673 (left side)

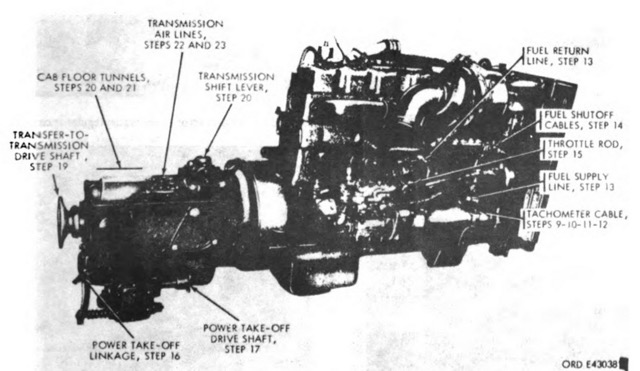
Mack ENDT673 (right side)

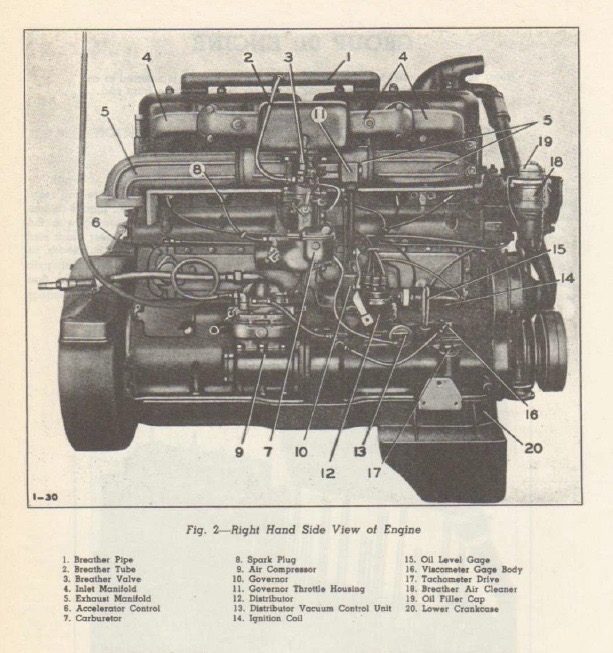
Mack EY

== REO ==
Model	Displacement	Fuel	Type	Power	Torque	Used in
OA-331	331 cu in (5.4 L)	G	I6	146 hp (109 kW) @3400rpm	330 lbf⋅ft (447 N⋅m)	M35 2 1/2-ton 6x6

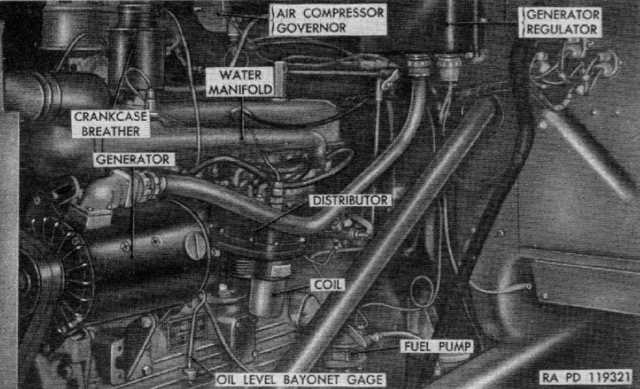
REO OA331 (left side)

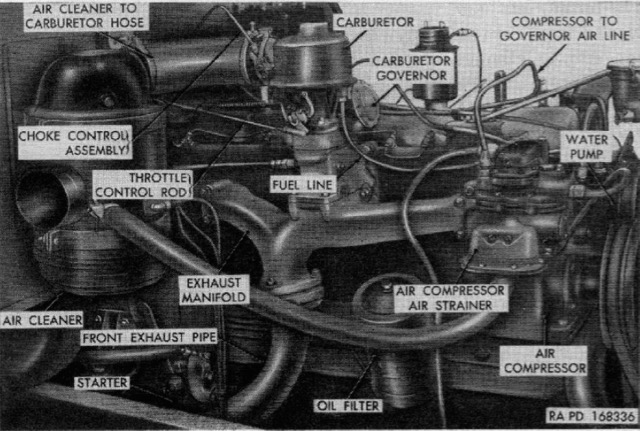
REO OA331 (right side)
