= Hercules DFXE =

Engine

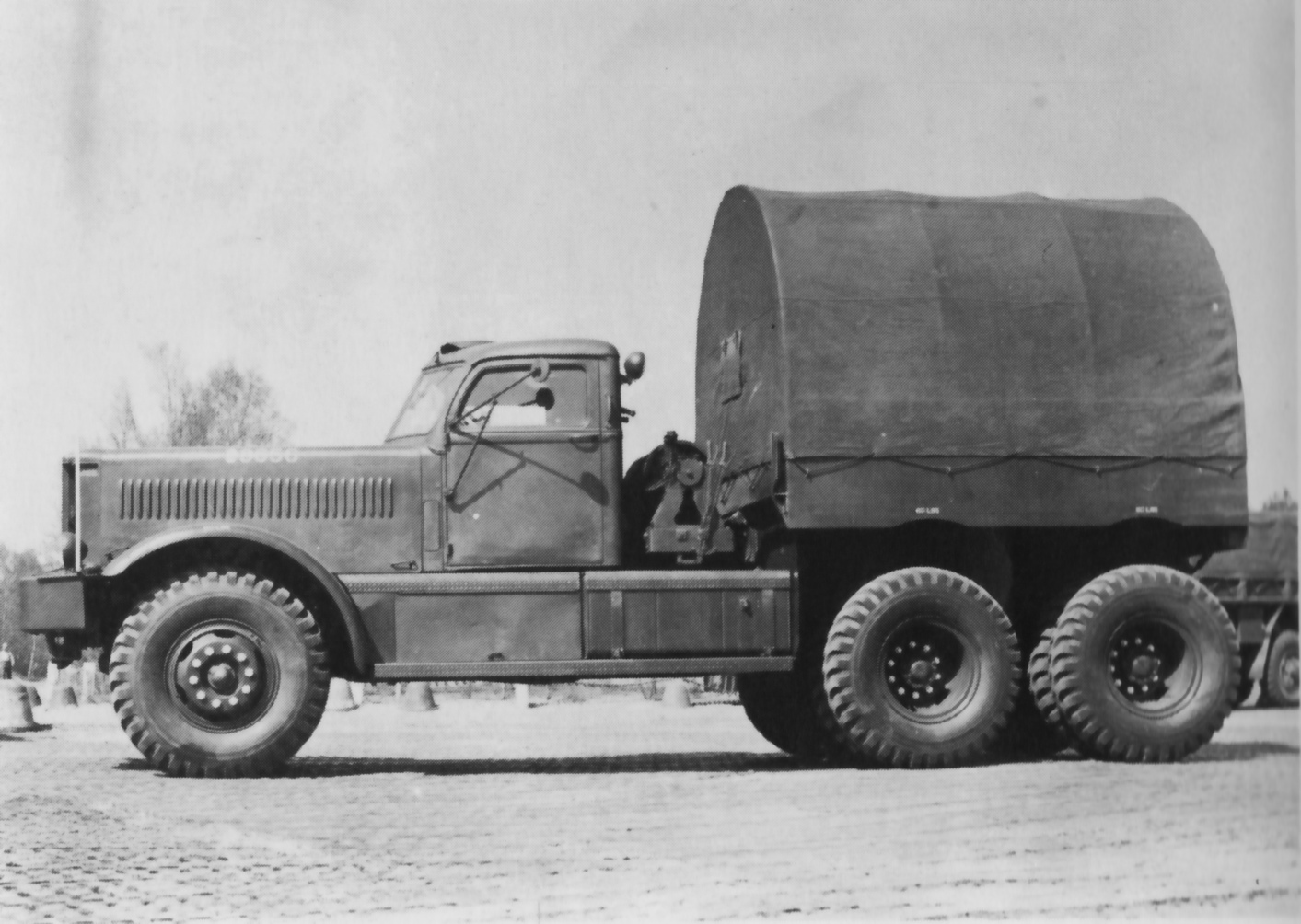
- The DFXE powered the Diamond T Models 980 and 981 tank transporter

Overview
- Manufacturer: Hercules Engine Company

Layout
- Configuration: Straight-6
- Displacement: 895 cu in (14.666 L)
- Cylinder bore: 5 5/8 in (143 mm)
- Piston stroke: 6 in (152 mm)
- Compression ratio: 14.8:1

Combustion
- Fuel type: Diesel

Output
- Power output: 201 bhp (150 kW) at 1600 rpm
- Torque output: 685 ft⋅lbf (929 N⋅m) at 1150 rpm; 660 ft⋅lbf (890 N⋅m) at 1600 rpm

The Hercules DFXE was an American diesel truck engine produced by the Hercules Engine Company.

Part of the Hercules DFX series, the DFXE is a naturally aspirated, direct injection, overhead valve, inline six-cylinder engine. The engine had a displacement of 895 cu in (14.666 L), with a bore of 5 5/8 in (143 mm), a stroke of 6 in (150 mm) and a compression ratio of 14.8:1. It developed 201 bhp (150 kW) at 1,600 rpm and a maximum 685 ft⋅lbf (929 N⋅m) of torque at 1150 rpm; 660 ft⋅lbf (890 N⋅m) at 1600 rpm.

The DFXE was designed to requirements of the British Purchasing Commission for use in the Diamond T Model 980 tank transporter. As the Diamond T Model 980 was later adopted by the US, the DFXE was one of the few diesel engines used by US tactical trucks during World War II.

The engine was used in upright or horizontal configurations.

It was used in the Diamond T Models 980 and 981 trucks in World War Two, the Le Tourneau Model B29 Tournapull earthmover (introduced in 1945), and the Oliver OC-18 crawler tractor (introduced in 1952), among others.

== Sources ==
- Berndt, Thomas. Standard Catalog of U.S. Military Vehicles 1940–1965. Iola, WI: Krause Publications, 1993.
- Doyle, David (2003). Standard catalog of U.S. Military Vehicles. Krause Publications. ISBN 0-87349-508-X.
- Orlemann, Eric R. LeTourneau Earthmovers. St Paul, Minnesota: MBI Publishing Co, 2001.
- U.S. Department of the Army. TM 9-1768A: Tractor Truck M20, Component Of 45-Ton Tank Transporter, Truck-Trailer M19, Engine, Clutch, Fuel System, And Cooling System. Washington, DC: United States Government Printing Office, 22 June 1945.
- U.S. Department of the Army (25 October 1944). TM 9-768: 45-ton Tank Transporter Truck-trailer M19. Washington, DC: United States Government Printing Office.
- U.S. Department of the Army. TM55-1031: Engines, Diesel, Hercules: Series DFXB, DFXC, DFXD, and DFXE. Washington, DC: United States Government Printing Office, November 1944.
- Ware, Pat. The Diamond T Models 980, 981: Britain's second-generation tank transporter. Yalding, Kent: Kelsey Media, 2020.
- Wendel, C. H. Standard Catalog of Farm Tractors, 1890-1980. Iola, WI: KP Books, 2005.
