= M25 tank transporter =

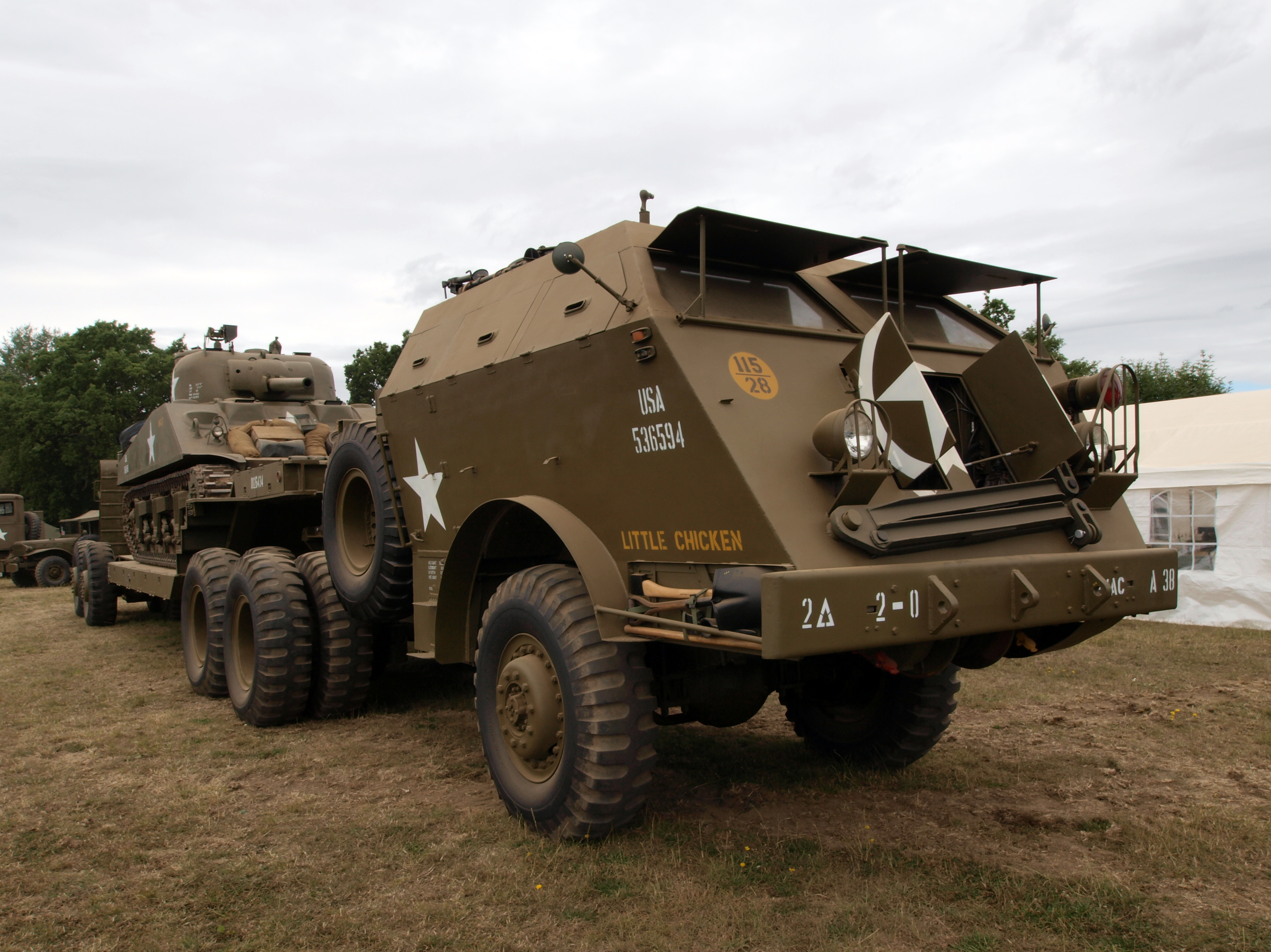
- An M25 tank transporter, with an M4 Sherman tank at the 2010 War and Peace show
- Type: 40 ton (36,287 kg) 6x6 Tank recovery truck-trailer
- Place of origin: United States

Service history
- In service: 1941–1955
- Wars: World War II

Production history
- Designer: Knuckey Truck Company
- Manufacturer: M26: Pacific Car & Foundry Co. M15: Fruehauf Trailer Co.
- Variants: M26A1, M26A2

Specifications (M25)
- Mass: Empty; M26: 48,000 lb (22,000 kg); M15: 36,600 lb (16,600 kg); M25: 84,300 lb (38,200 kg); Loaded M26: 103,000 lb (47,000 kg); M15: 36,600 lb (16,600 kg) M25: 164,300 lb (74,500 kg)
- Length: M26: 25 feet 4 inches (7.72 m); M15: 38 feet 5 1/16 inches (11.71 m)
- Width: M26: 10 feet 10 3/4 inches (3.32 m); M15 12 feet 6 inches (3,810 mm)
- Height: M26: 11 feet 5 inches (3.48 m)
- Crew: 7
- Armor: front 3/4 in (19 mm) sides, rear 1/4 in (6.4 mm)
- Main armament: .50 cal M2 machine gun
- Engine: Hall-Scott 440 gasoline 240 hp (180 kW)
- Transmission: 4 speed x 3 speed
- Fuel capacity: 120 US gal (450 L)
- Operational range: 120 mi (193.1 km)
- Maximum speed: 28 mph (45 km/h)

The M25 tank transporter (G160) was a combination 6x6 M26 armored heavy tank transporter/tank recovery tractor and companion 40-ton M15 trailer introduced into US Army service in Europe in 1944–45. Manufactured by Pacific Car & Foundry Co., it was a substantial upgrade over the Diamond T M19 transporter/trailer duo introduced in 1940.

Nicknamed the Dragon Wagon, it was replaced by the 10 ton 6x6 M123 semi-tractor beginning in 1955.

== Development ==
In 1942 a new 40 ton semi-trailer tank transporter was needed with better off-road performance than the M9 24 small-wheel trailer, and greater capacity than the 30 ton 8 large-wheel Shelvoke and Drewry semi-trailers used by the Diamond T tractor unit. Designed by the Fruehauf Trailer Company of Detroit, Michigan, it was heavier than the Diamond T could manage. A companion M26 tractor was designed by the San Francisco-based Knuckey Truck Company. When it could not keep up with the Army's demands, production was awarded to the Pacific Car & Foundry Co. of Seattle, Washington.

Designated TR-1 by Pacific Car, the chain-driven 12-ton 6x6 M26 tractor was powered by a Hall-Scott 440 1,090 cu in (17.9 L) 6-cylinder gasoline engine developing 240 hp (180 kW) at 2000 rpm and 810 lbf⋅ft (1,098 N⋅m) at 1200 rpm. Developed for the M26, it was used to uprate the Diamond T. Some 2,100 Type 440s were built. Baxter notes "over 1,300" M26 and M26A1 being built.

Unusually, the tractor unit was fitted with both an armored cab and two winches with a combined pull of 60 tons, allowing it to do light battlefield recovery work.

A later unarmored version of the M26 tractor was designated the M26A1. An experimental ballast tractor conversion was evaluated by the British Fighting Vehicle Proving Establishment

After the war, both armored and unarmored versions were bought as surplus and used to carry oversize loads such as transformers, locomotives and heavy equipment.

== Gallery ==
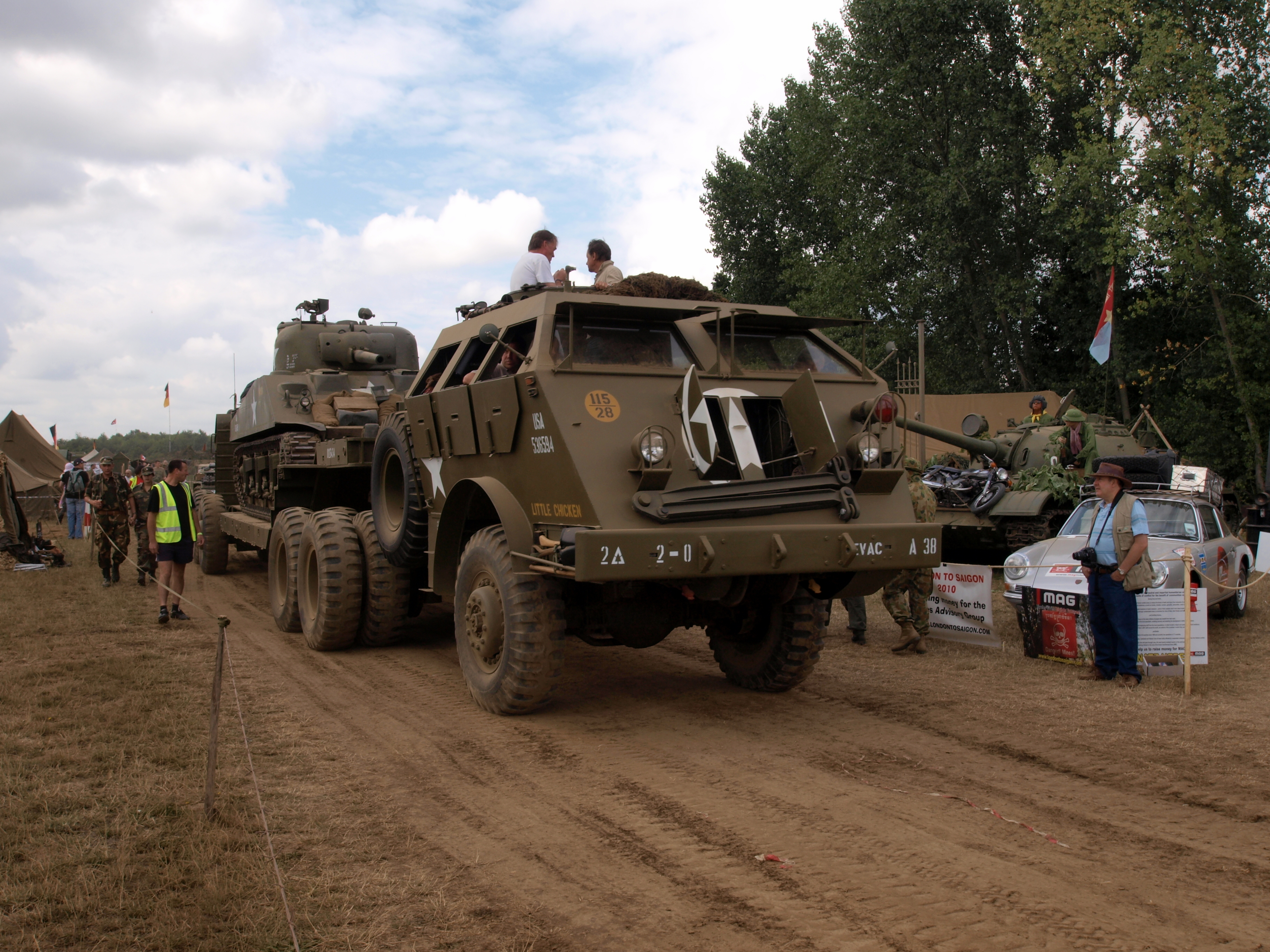
M25 with M26 armored semi-tractor

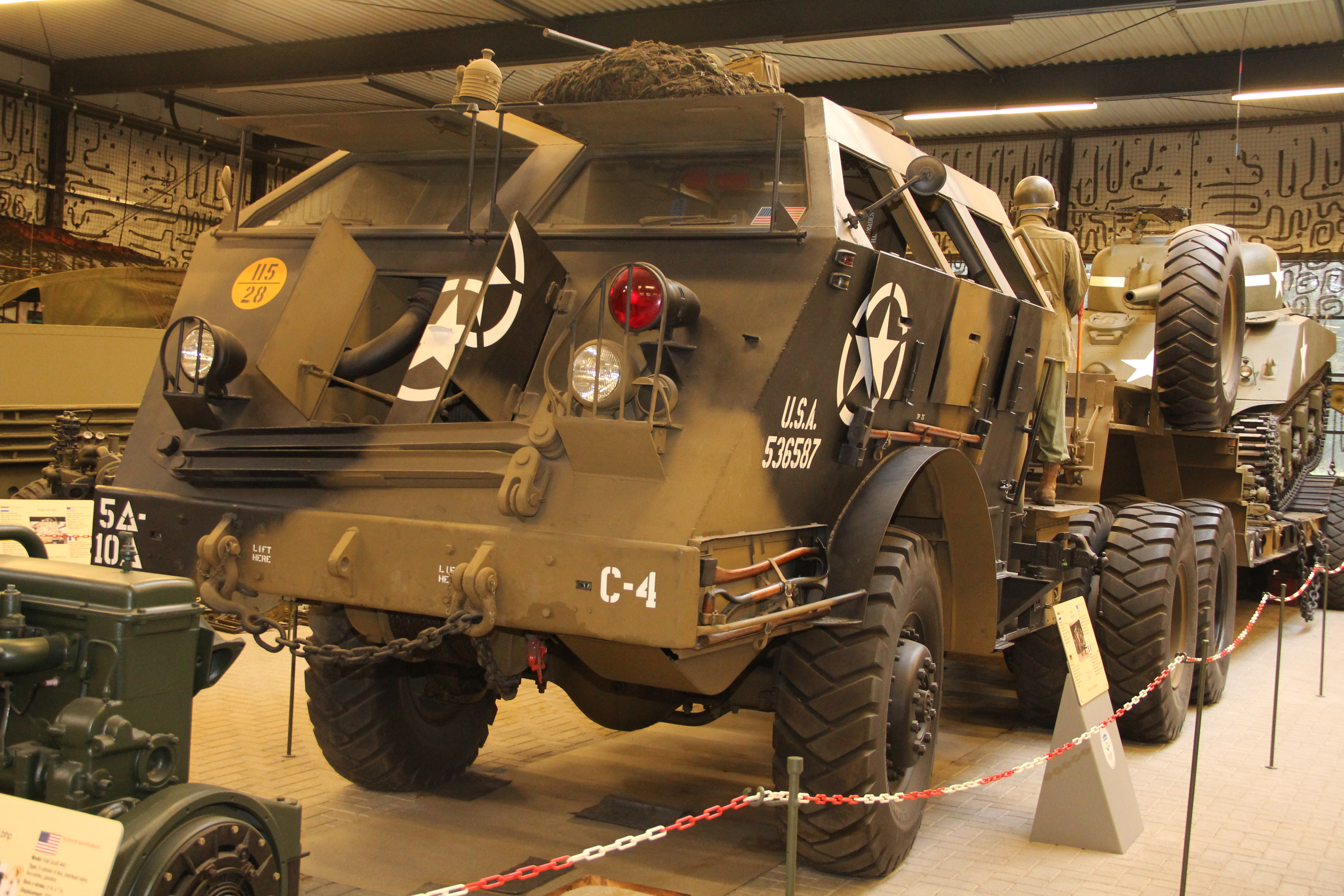
Display of M25 with M26 armored semi-tractor

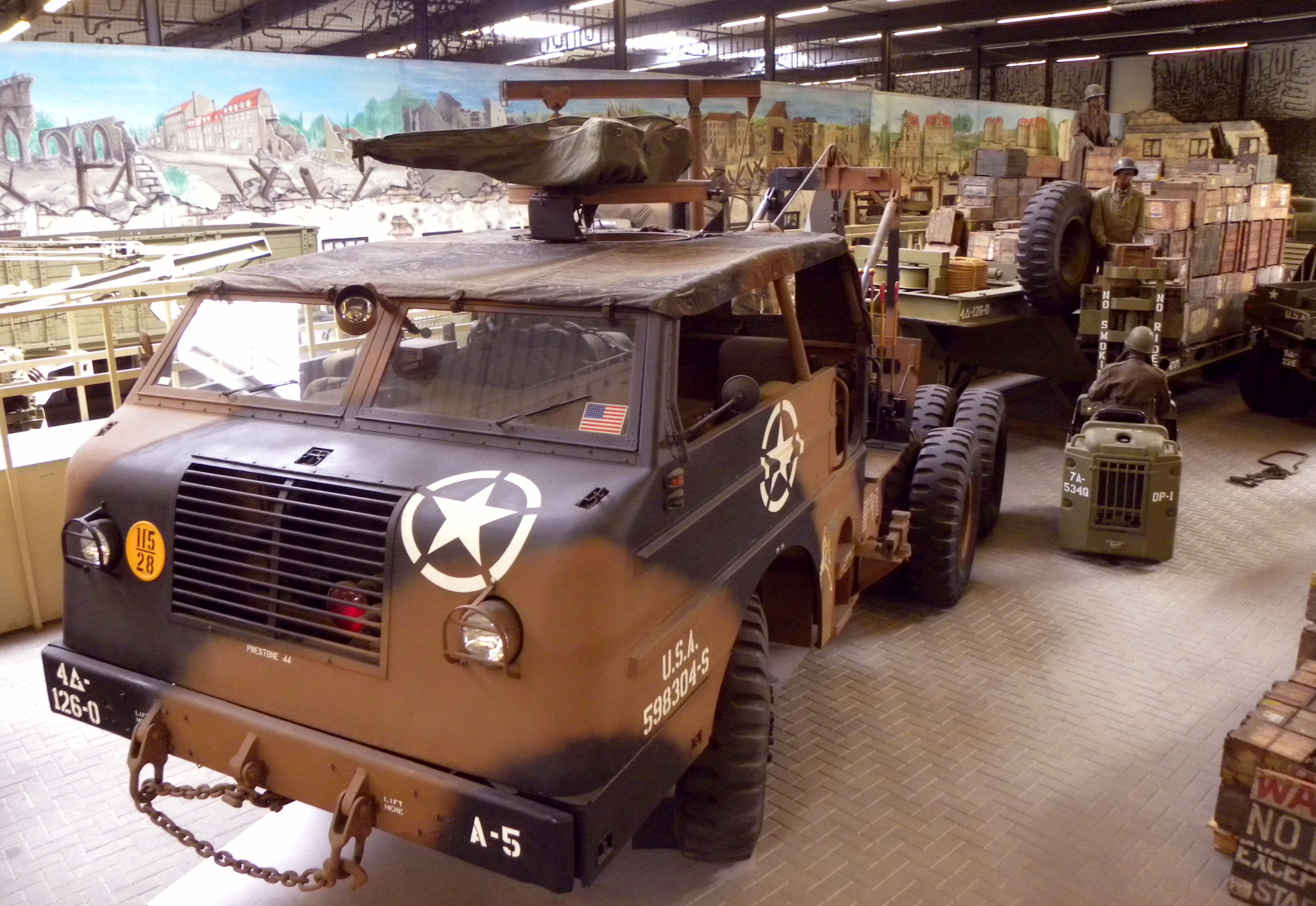
Display of M25 with M26A1 unarmored semi-tractor

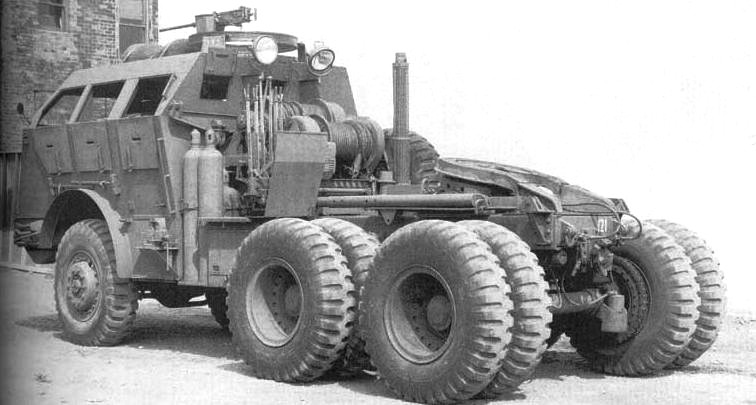
M26 semi-tractor (LR view)

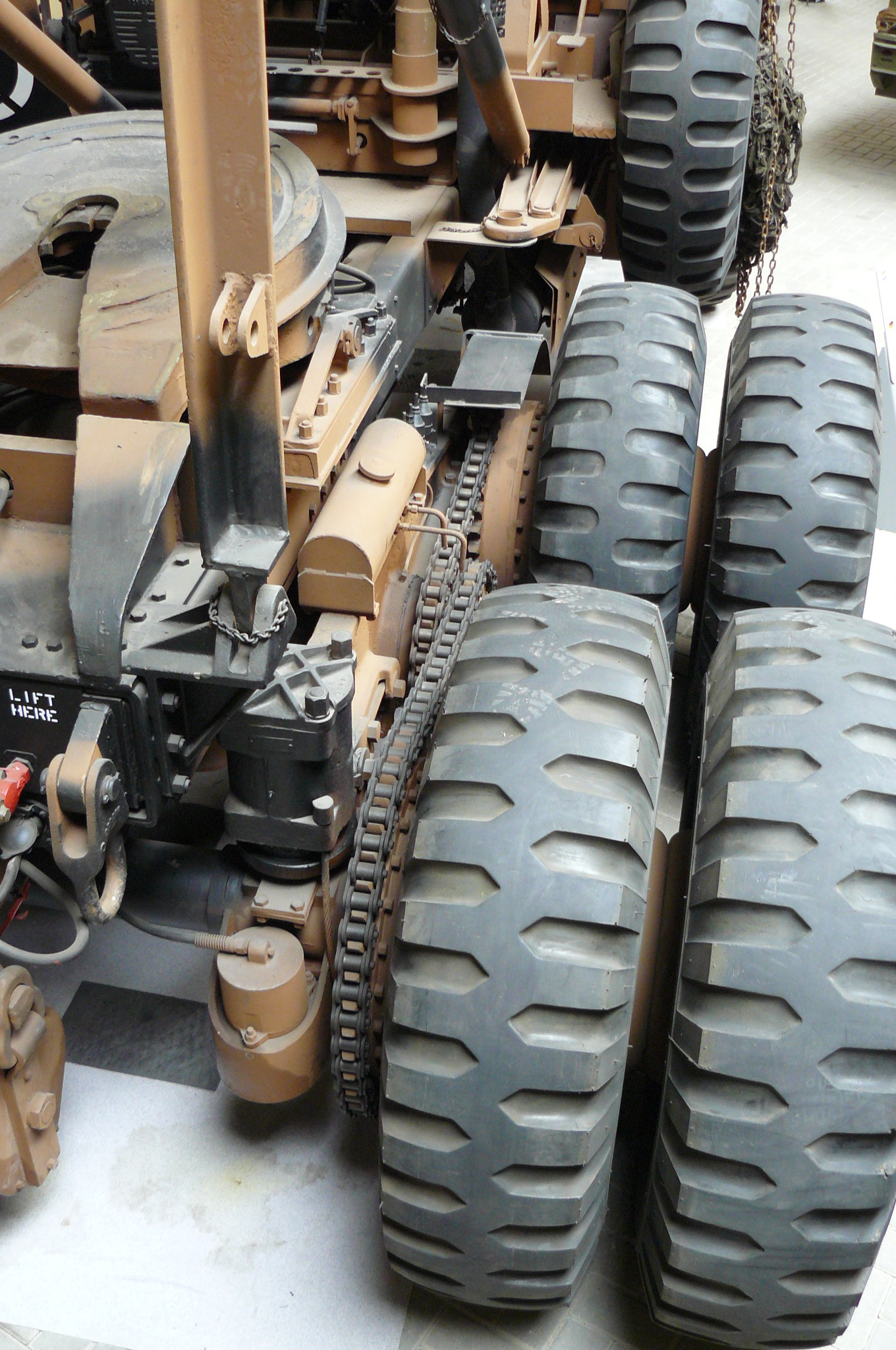
M26 semi-tractor showing rear wheel drive by chains

== Specifications ==
- Crew 7
- Armament 1 .50 cal. machine gun
- Armor, front 3/4 inch, sides and rear, 1/4 inch.
- Top speed 26 MPH
- Fuel capacity 120 gallons

== Users ==
- Japan: Japan Ground Self-Defense Force
- United Kingdom: British Army
- United States: United States Army
- Yugoslavia: Yugoslav People's Army

== See also ==
- Diamond T tank transporter
- G160, "G" designation
- List of U.S. military vehicles by model number#Pre-consecutive trucks
- Pacific Car & Foundry Co.
- Scammell Pioneer Semi-trailer
