= Hercules Engine Company =

American manufacturer (1915–1999)

Hercules Engine Corporation
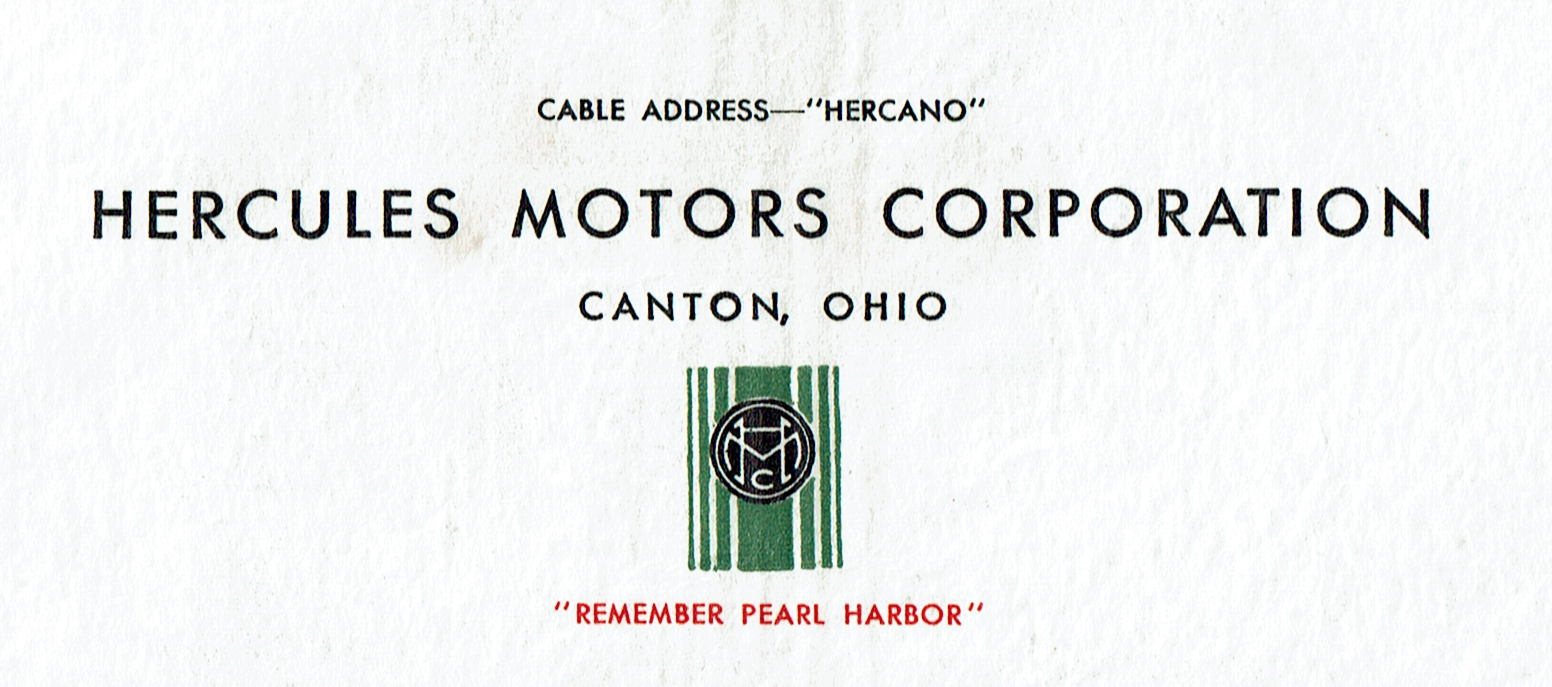
- Logo in 1943
- Founded: 1915 in Canton, Ohio, United States (110 years ago)
- Defunct: 1999 (25 years ago)
- Products: Gasoline and Diesel Engines

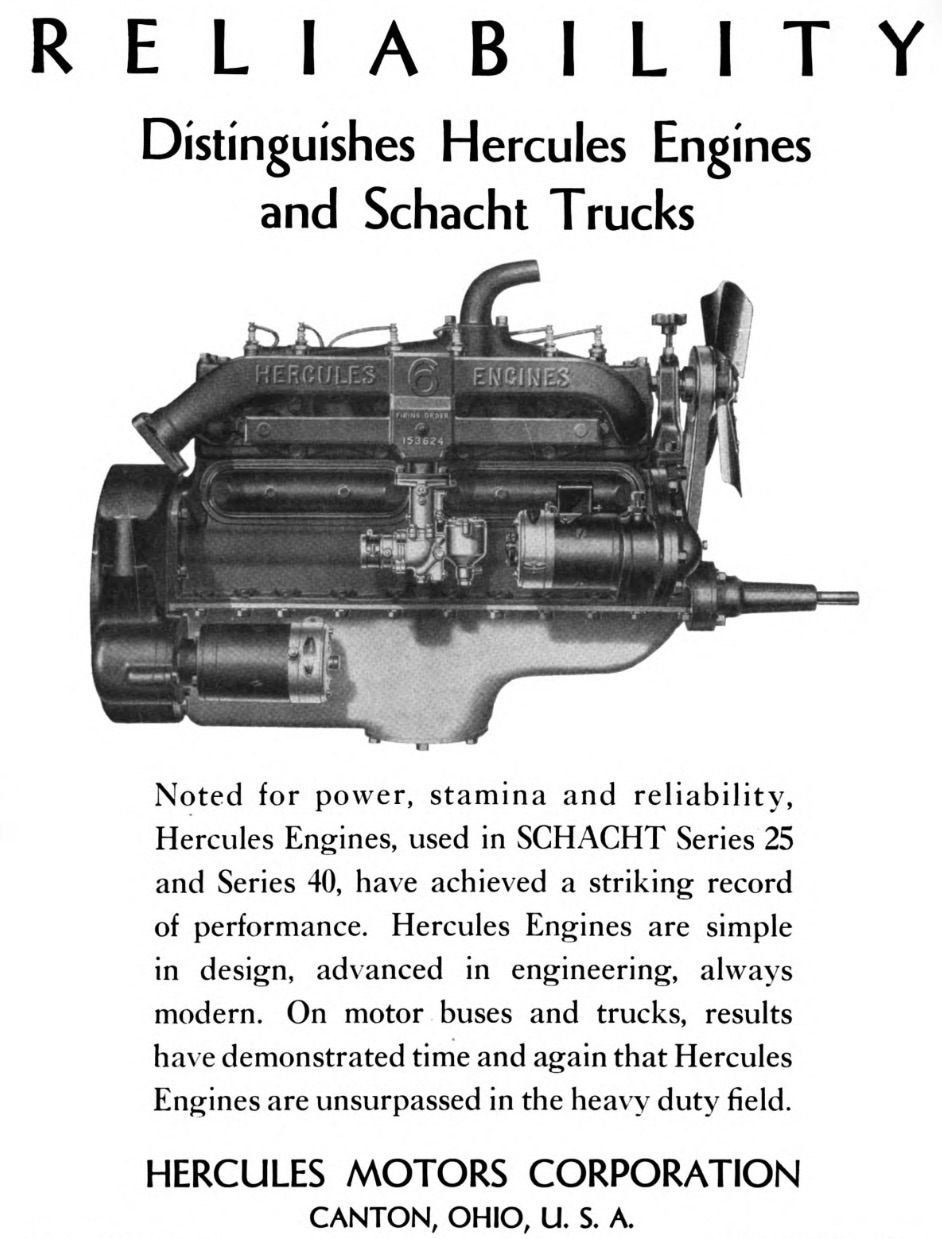
Hercules Engine Company (1930)

Hercules Engine Corporation was an American engine manufacturer Canton, Ohio.

== History ==
The company was founded in 1915, known at first as Hercules Motor Manufacturing Company, to build industrial engines, especially for trucks. The company reincorporated and reorganized in 1923, emerging as Hercules Motors Corporation. Hercules expanded greatly in the interwar period, developing gas and diesel engines, serving the needs for truck, tractor and a plethora of equipment operators.

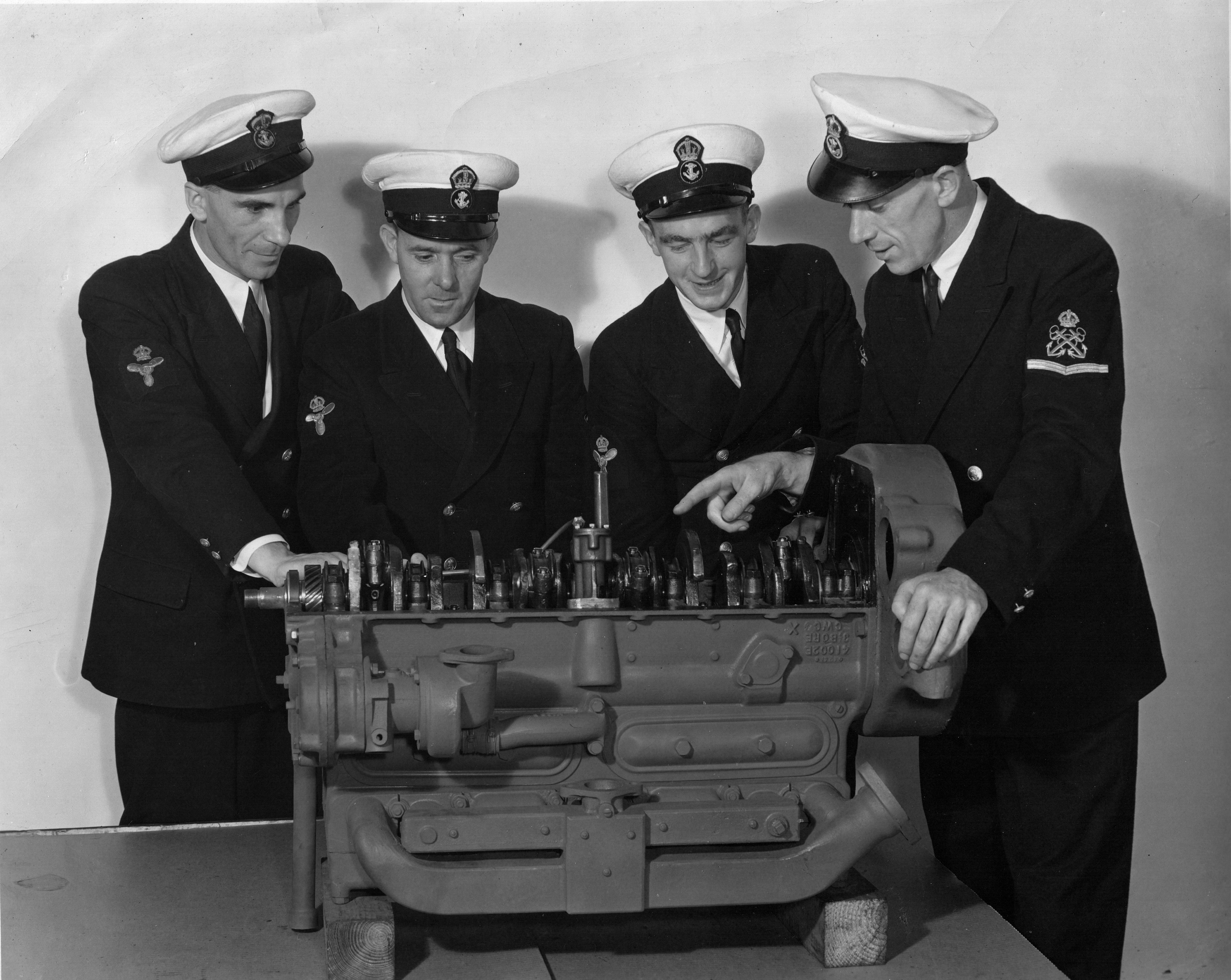
Four UK sailors studying a Hercules engine, 1943

During World War II the company produced about 750,000 gasoline and diesel engines for Allied military vehicles, ships, and various equipment. But Hercules could not respond effectively to changes in the post-WWII engine market, so WWII remained its high water mark in terms of output, earnings and profits.

In 1961 Cleveland-based Hupp Corp. purchased Hercules but failed to grow it substantially. But it did turn the focus to building engines for military applications as a means to keep the doors open. White Truck Corp., also based in Cleveland, purchased Hupp in 1967. White Truck was a huge and growing firm at the time (about $1 billion in sales) and it laid out ambitious plans for Hercules expansion, beginning product development and construction of a new plant in Canton. Hercules became known as White Engine at this point. This new trajectory for Hercules was short lived, however, with a rapid decline in White's fortunes, leaving Hercules little changed. White sold Hercules to Wedtech in 1986, which held the engine maker only briefly, before selling to a group of investors the next year. Significant here with the new owners was the recovery of its old name – Hercules. Kept afloat by securing a string of contracts for military trucks at home and abroad, plus a limited number of engine sales to equipment makers (such as lift trucks), Hercules Engine limped along, posting uneven financial numbers. By the 1990s its cash flow was precarious and military contracts dried up, leading to speculation for years that the company would fold. At the time of its closure in 1999, the company occupied a 26-acre site at 101 Eleventh St. SE in Canton, with over 600,000 square feet of industrial space.

== Engines ==
Hercules made a wide range of engines from 1915 to 1999, both gasoline, diesel and kerosine engines. Many of the first engines were single cylinder stationary engines, but there were also four cylinder engines used in the Fordson and later Massey-Harris tractors. Below is a selection of the better known engines.

Model	Displacement	Fuel	Power	Torque	Used in
DFXE	855 cu in (14.0 L)	Diesel	201 hp (150 kW)	685 lbf⋅ft (929 N⋅m)	Diamond T 980/981
HXC	855 cu in (14.0 L)	Gasoline	202 hp (151 kW)	642 lbf⋅ft (870 N⋅m)	6-ton 6x6 truck
JXD	320 cu in (5.2 L)	Gasoline	86 hp (64 kW)	200 lbf⋅ft (271 N⋅m)	Studebaker US6; M8 Greyhound
L142	142 cu in (2.3 L)	Gasoline	71 hp (53 kW)	128 lbf⋅ft (174 N⋅m)	M151 series
LDT-465	478 cu in (7.8 L)	Multifuel	130 hp (97 kW)	305 lbf⋅ft (414 N⋅m)	M35 series
RXC	529 cu in (8.7 L)	Gasoline	112 hp (84 kW)	368 lbf⋅ft (499 N⋅m)	Autocar U8144T 5- to 6-ton 4x4 truck
