= M19 tank transporter =

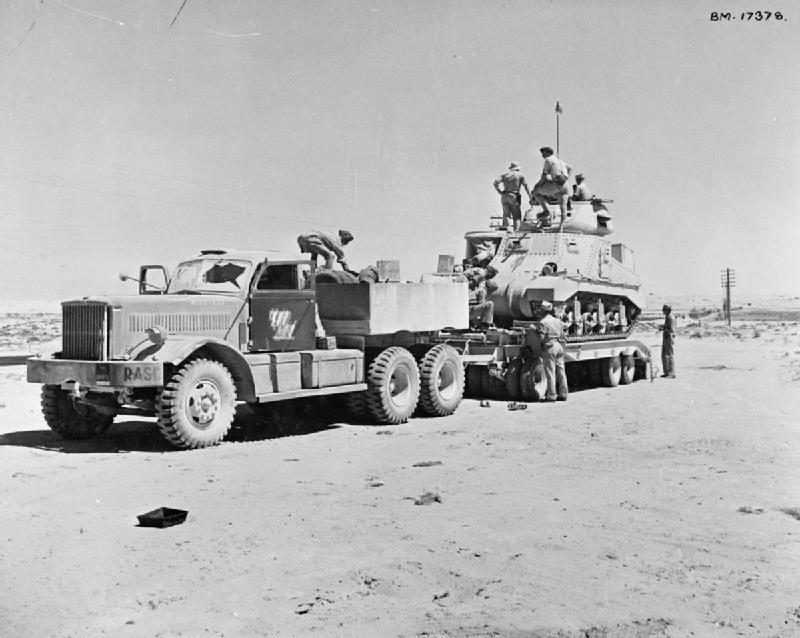
- M19 tank transporter system (M20 truck and M9 trailer) carrying a Grant tank
- Type: 45-ton Truck-trailer
- Place of origin: United States

Production history
- Manufacturer: Diamond T (M20 truck); Fruehauf Trailer Corporation, Winter-Weis, Rodgers (M9 trailer)
- Produced: 1941–1945
- No. built: 6,554 (M20 truck)

Specifications (M20 truck)
- Mass: 26,650 lb (12.09 t) empty 45,000 lb (20,000 kg) loaded
- Length: 23 ft 4 in (7.11 m)
- Width: 8 ft 6 in (2.59 m)
- Height: 8 ft 5 in (2.57 m)
- Engine: Hercules DFXE; 201 hp (150 kW)
- Transmission: 4 speed × 3 speed auxiliary
- Suspension: Beam axles on leaf springs
- Operational range: 300 mi (480 km)
- Maximum speed: 23 mph (37 km/h)

M19 tank transporter

Specifications (M9 trailer)
- Mass: 22,020 lb (9,990 kg) (empty); 112,020 lb (50,810 kg) (loaded)
- Length: 29 ft 8 in (9.04 m) (incl. drawbar)
- Width: 9 ft 6 in (2.90 m)
- Height: 4 ft 9 in (1.45 m)
- Suspension: Trailing beams (front) center pivot beams (rear)

The M19 tank transporter (US supply catalog designation G159) was a heavy tank transporter system used in World War II and into the 1950s. It consisted of a 12-ton 6×4 M20 Diamond T model 980 truck and companion 12-wheel M9 trailer.

Over 5,000 were produced, and employed by Allied armies throughout all theaters of war. It was superseded in the U.S. military by the M25 tank transporter during the war, but usefully redeployed in other tasks. It was superseded by the Thornycroft Antar in British service by the early 1950s, though a few remained operational in units through 1971.

== History ==
Designed as a heavy prime mover for tank transporting, the hard-cab Diamond T 980 was the product of the Diamond T Company in Chicago. In 1940 the British Purchasing Commission, looking to equip the British Army with a vehicle capable of transporting larger and heavier tanks, approached a number of American truck manufacturers to assess their models. The Diamond T Company had a long history of building rugged, military vehicles for the U.S. Army Quartermaster Corps and had recently produced a prototype heavy vehicle for the US Army which, with a few slight modifications met British requirements and an initial order for 200 was very quickly filled.

The result was the Diamond T 980, a 12-short-ton (11 t) hard-cab 6×4 truck. Powered by a Hercules DFXE diesel engine developing 201 hp (150 kW) and geared very low, it could pull a trailer of up to 115,000 lb (52 t) and proved capable of the task of moving the heaviest tanks then in service.

== Specifications (M20 truck) ==
=== Engine ===
The M20 used a Hercules DFXE, a 895 cu in (14.666 L) displacement naturally aspirated inline 6-cylinder diesel engine developing 201 bhp (150 kW) at 1,600 rpm and 685 ft⋅lbf (929 N⋅m) at 1150 rpm. Designed for a British requirement, this was one of the few diesel engines used in US tactical trucks.

=== Driveline ===
A two plate dry disk diaphragm spring clutch drove Fuller four-speed main and three-speed auxiliary transmissions. The main transmission had a "low" first gear and three road gears, 4th being direct. The auxiliary had low, direct, and overdrive gears. The low gear allowed several very low gears for extreme off-road use. The direct and overdrive allowed the three road gears to be split, making six road gears.

Spicer driveshafts drove two Timken double-reduction axles with an 11.66:1 final drive ratio.

=== Chassis ===
The M20 truck had a riveted ladder frame with three beam axles, the front on leaf springs, the rear tandem on leaf springs with locating arms. The wheelbase was 179 in (455 cm), measured from the centerline of the front axle to the centerline of rear bogie. A pintle hitch of 115,000 lb (52,000 kg) capacity was mounted on the rear frame crossmember; another pintle hitch was mounted on the front crossmember for positioning the trailer.

All models had Budd split rim disc wheels with 12.20×20-20" tires. Dual rear mud and snow tires were used.

Air powered drum brakes were used on all axles; the trailer brakes could be operated independently of the service brakes. A single disk transmission brake parking brake was also provided. This used four brake pads with a cable clasp mechanism onto a 16 in (41 cm) disk, mounted behind the auxiliary transmission.

A Garwood winch of 40,000 lb (18,000 kg) capacity, with 300 ft (91 m) of cable, was mounted behind the cab. In the Model 980 it was intended mainly for hauling damaged tanks aboard the trailers. The Model 981, introduced in 1942, had a winch with 500 ft (150 m) of cable, which could be used from both the front and rear. This allowed tank recovery, in addition to loading.

=== Body ===
Early trucks used a standard Diamond T commercial cab, also used by the four-ton G509 trucks. In August 1943 it was replaced with an open military cab. A long butterfly hood had vertical louvres along both sides.

A short ballast body was mounted behind the winch. There were closed tool compartments along both sides, two open containers in the front, and a bottom-hinged tailgate. The spare tire was mounted in the front. The box could hold 18,000 lb (8,200 kg) of ballast to increase traction on the rear tandem axles.

== Specifications (M9 trailer) ==
The M9 had tandem rear axles and a single front axle on a rotating dolly. Ramps hinged down at the rear end of the trailer. Cable rollers and sheaves let the winch from the M20 truck pull tanks onto the trailer, chocks and chains were used to secure the load.

The front axle suspension system was trailing beam assemblies on coil springs, with a dual tire wheel on each side of the beam. With an assembly on each side there were four wheels on the axle line.

The rear tandem beam assembly was a center pivot type, with axles on both ends of the beam. A dual tire wheel was on both ends of both axles, with a beam on each side there were also four wheels per axle line. Twenty-four 8.25×15" tires on demountable rims were used, two on each wheel.

== Service ==
Production began in 1941. The first batch was received in Britain in 1942 and very quickly demonstrated their rugged reliability in the British campaign in North Africa. Battle-damaged tanks needed to be quickly recovered, often under hostile fire, and returned to workshops for repair.

5,871 were eventually built by 1945 and were used by virtually every Allied army in every theatre of World War II. U.S. forces in Europe preferred the M25 tank transporter, citing the fact that the M19 suffered from a wide turning radius, poor traction of the truck, and excessive rolling resistance. Five 1 short ton (910 kg) concrete blocks were routinely carried in the bed of the truck to improve traction; the conversion of an M20 truck and M9 trailer to a semi-trailer configuration rather than a trailed configuration alleviated some of these problems, and also improved fuel economy by approximately fifty percent. In general, the M19 was mechanically reliable, but "did not meet the overall requirements of this theater" and was relegated to duty in the rear areas of the combat zone and in the Communications Zone, with the M25 being used for frontline service.

The British Army took delivery of around 1,000 during the war years and many continued in service afterwards, being replaced in the early 1950s with the Thornycroft Antar ("Mighty Antar"), although a few remained in tank transporter units up to 1971. Many of those sold off by the Army after the war were snapped up by heavy haulage and recovery specialists, notably Pickfords and Wynns, and were a familiar sight on Britain's roads, pulling heavy lowloaders and fairground trailers or parked on garage forecourts, in readiness for a heavy rescue operation equipped as wreckers (breakdown recovery trucks). They suffered from "very limited off-road performance" as a result of only the two rear axles being driven.

Many of the 70-year-old Diamond Ts can still be found in private ownership in Britain and frequently appear at historic vehicle shows.

== Nomenclature ==
This combination unit is referred to as the M19 tank transporter, consisting of the M20 tractor and M9 12 wheel trailer (this is 24 tires on 12 wheels). In the nomenclature system used by the United States Army Ordnance Corps Supply Catalog this vehicle is referred as the G159. It was superseded by the M26. After the introduction of the M26, the U.S. relegated M20s to ammunition hauling, for which they proved "tremendous".

British designation for the tractor unit was Diamond T Tractor 6×4 for 40 ton Trailer with "Model 980" or "Model 981" added to distinguish the two. The British-built trailers were known as "40 ton Trailer British Mk. I (Crane)" "40 ton Trailer British Mk.II (Dyson)" being manufactured by Cranes of Dereham and R. A. Dyson and Company of Liverpool.

== Gallery ==
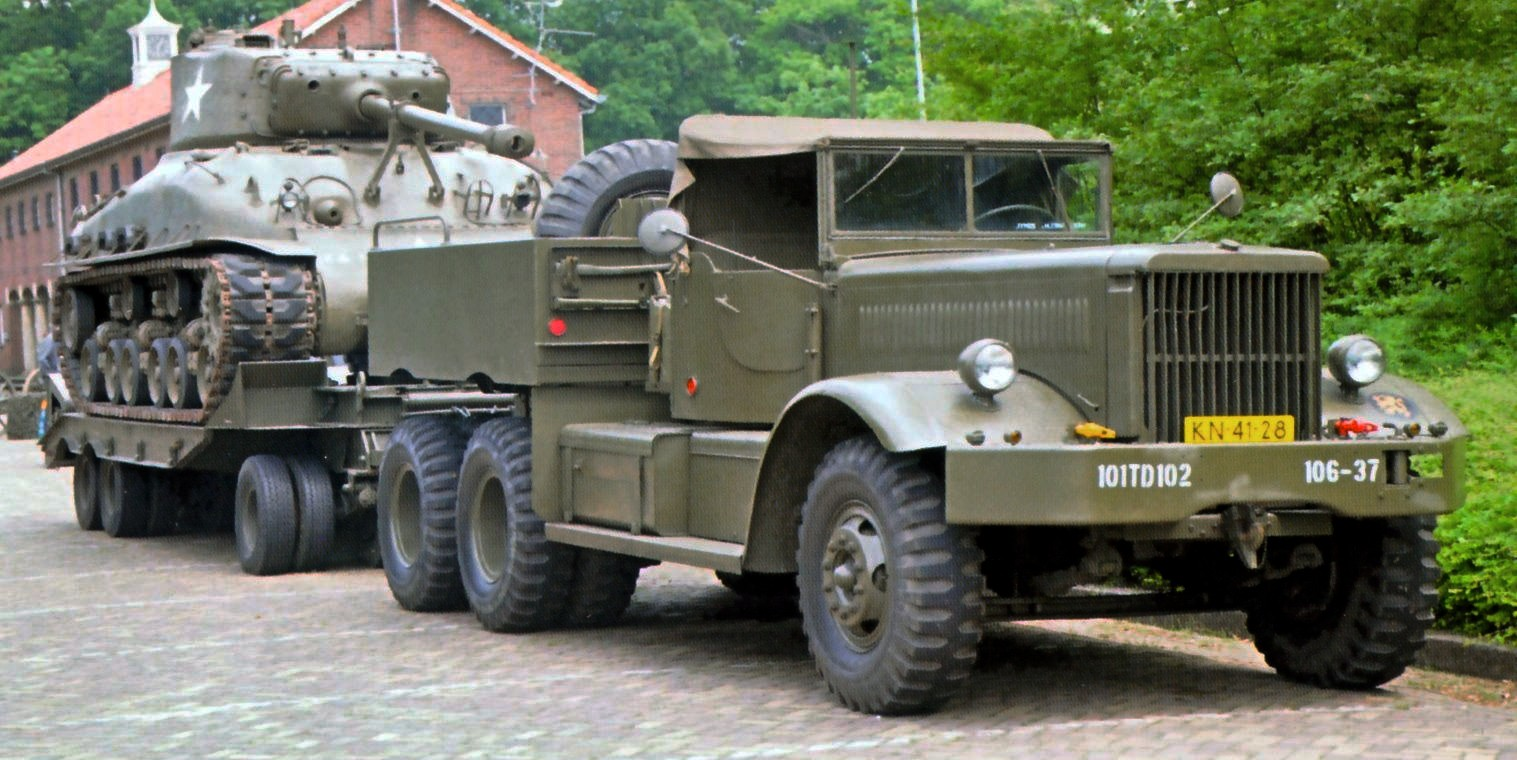
Diamond T tank transporter of the Dutch army carrying an M4 Sherman at the historic army days at Oirschot, the Netherlands

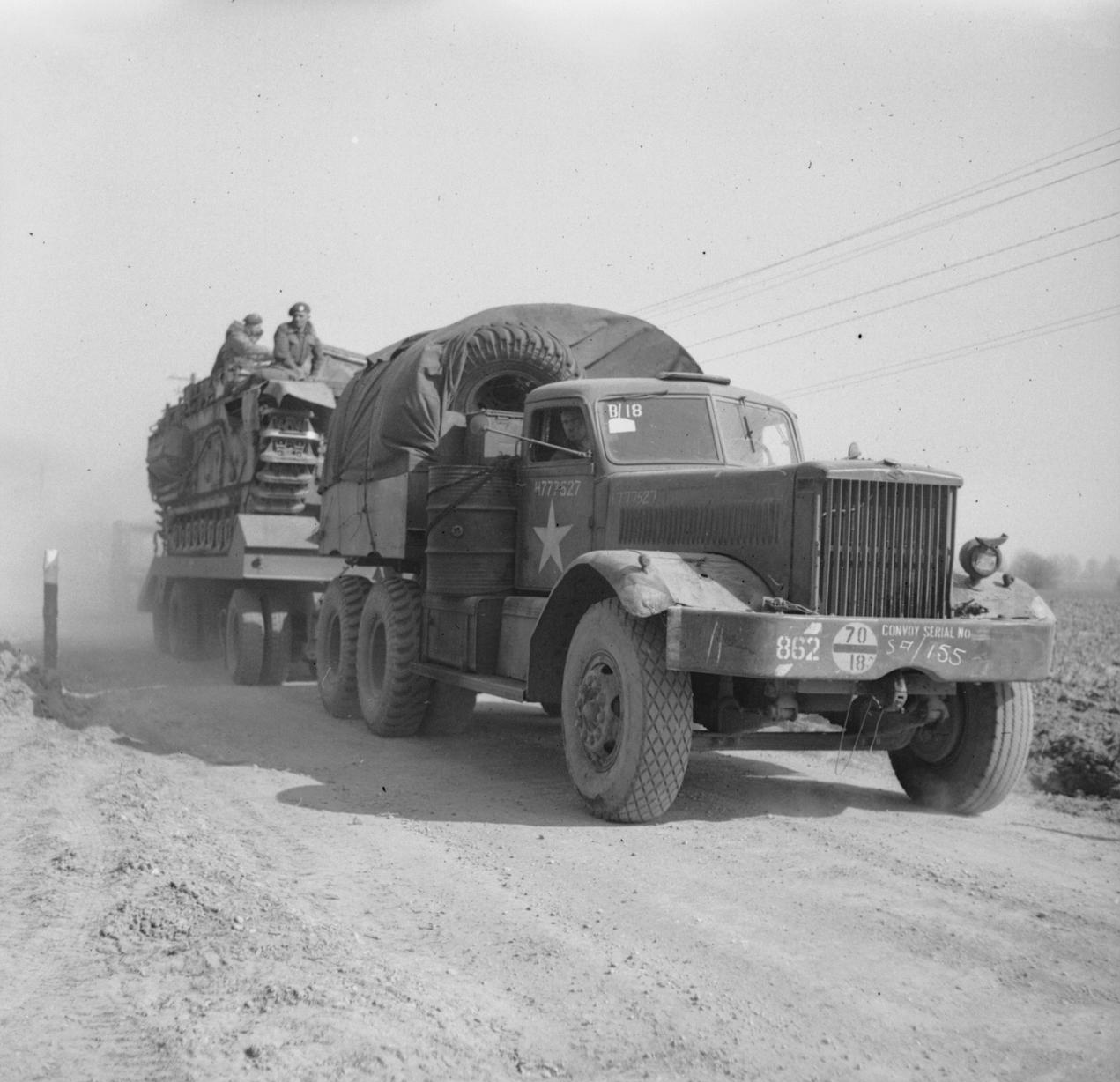
Diamond T tank transporter with a Churchill tank during preparations for crossing the Rhine

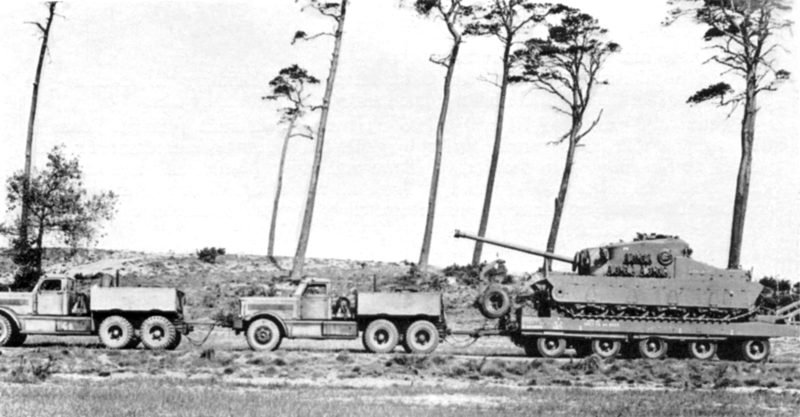
Two Diamond T tractors towing a Tortoise heavy tank, 1948

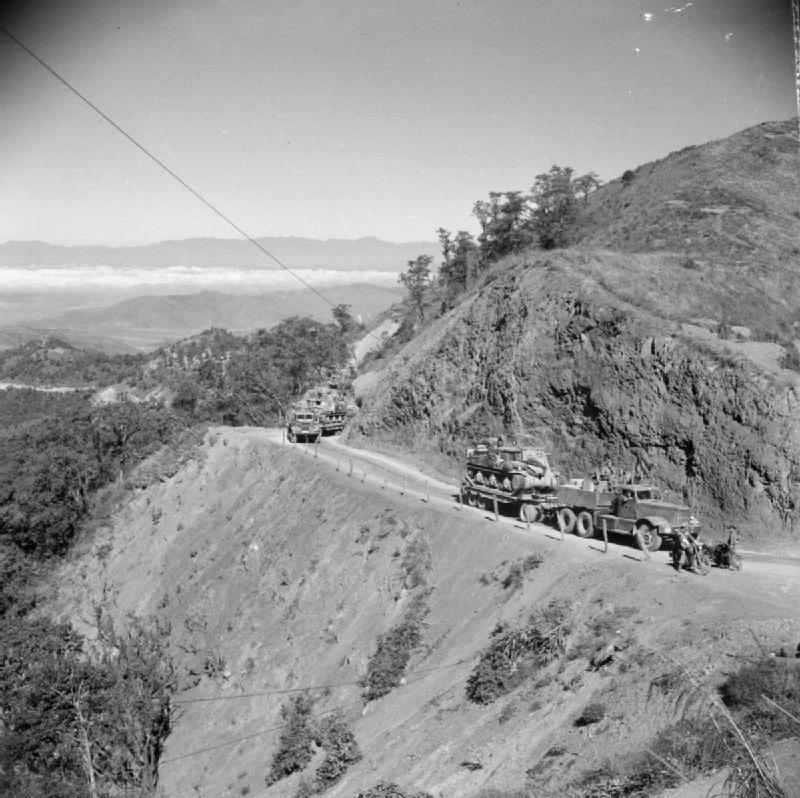
Diamond T tank transporters of the British Army with a load of a Grant ARV, followed by one with a Grant gun tank, in Burma, 1945.

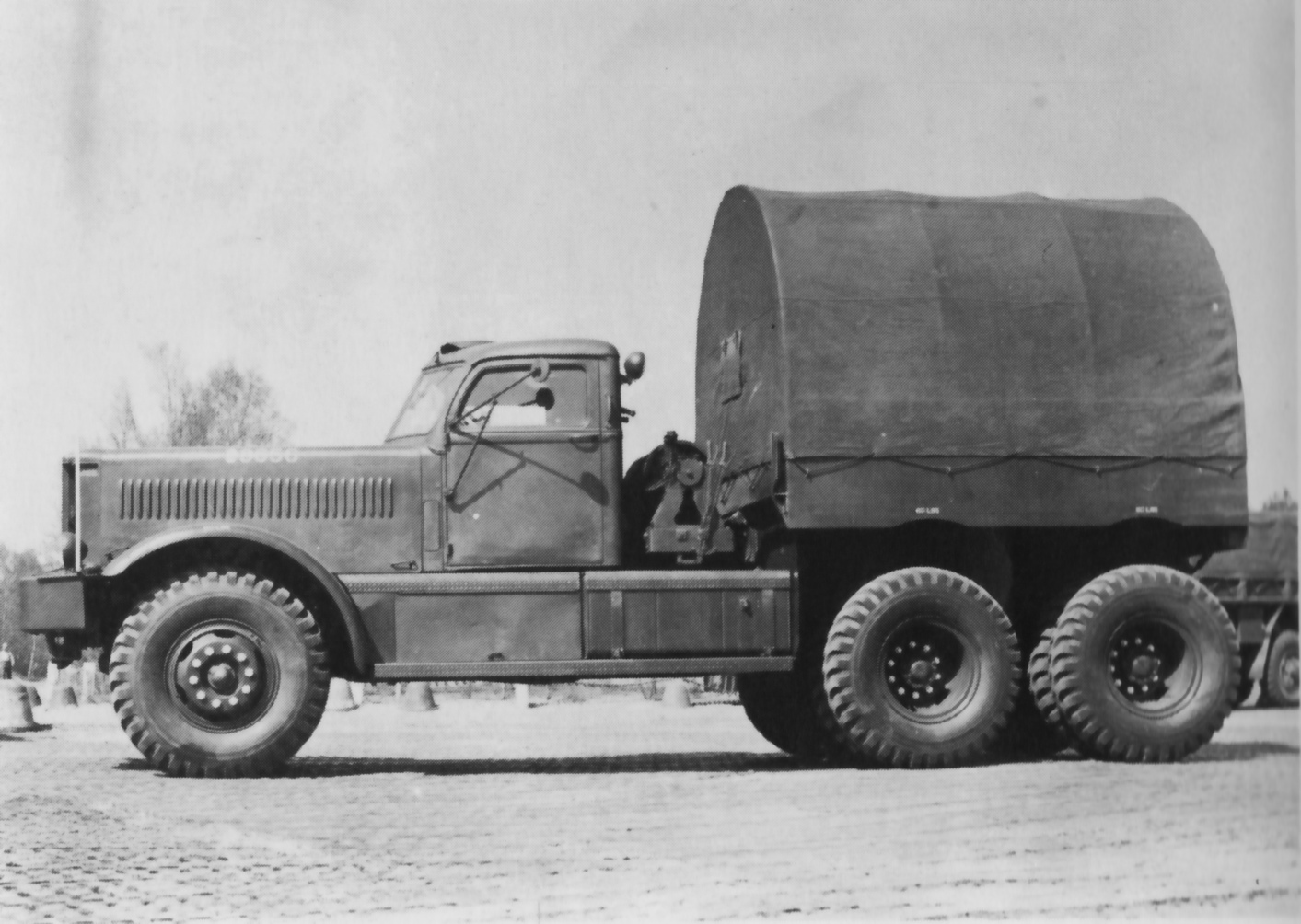
Diamond T M20 ballast tractor used by the Dutch Army

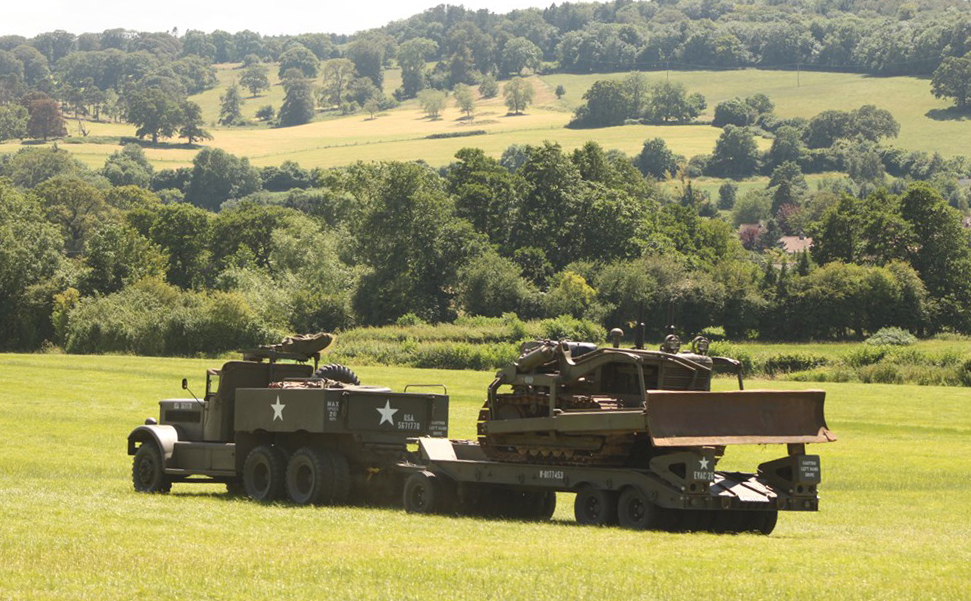
Preserved M19 tank transporter with bulldozer

== See also ==
- Scammell Pioneer
- G159, "G" designation
- List of U.S. military vehicles by model number#Pre-consecutive trucks
