= List of United States Army tactical truck models =

By 1915, the US Army was using trucks tactically. When the US joined World War I in April, 1917 it began purchasing trucks in larger numbers. Early trucks were often designed for both military and commercial use, later military-specific designs were built. Since 1940 the US military has ordered over 3,000,000 tactical trucks. The US Marines have used both US Army and their own specific models, some are shown.

The "ton" (907 kg) weight ratings are the payload of a basic cargo version of the truck, not of the individual version.

The "wheel arrangement" designation is the number of wheels x the number of driven wheels. There are two wheels per axle, dual tires are counted as one wheel. Some series have both single and dual tire models.

"Total built" usually includes for US forces and any export orders.

== 1915 ==
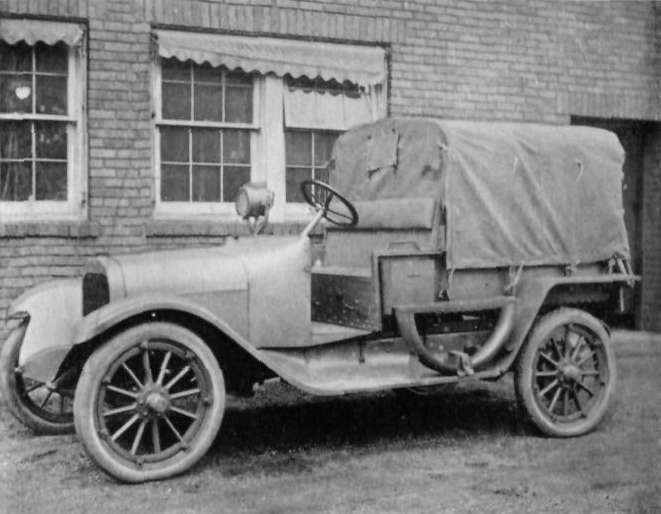
Dodge 1/2-ton 4x2

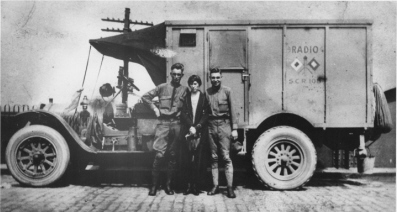
White 1 1/2-ton 4x2

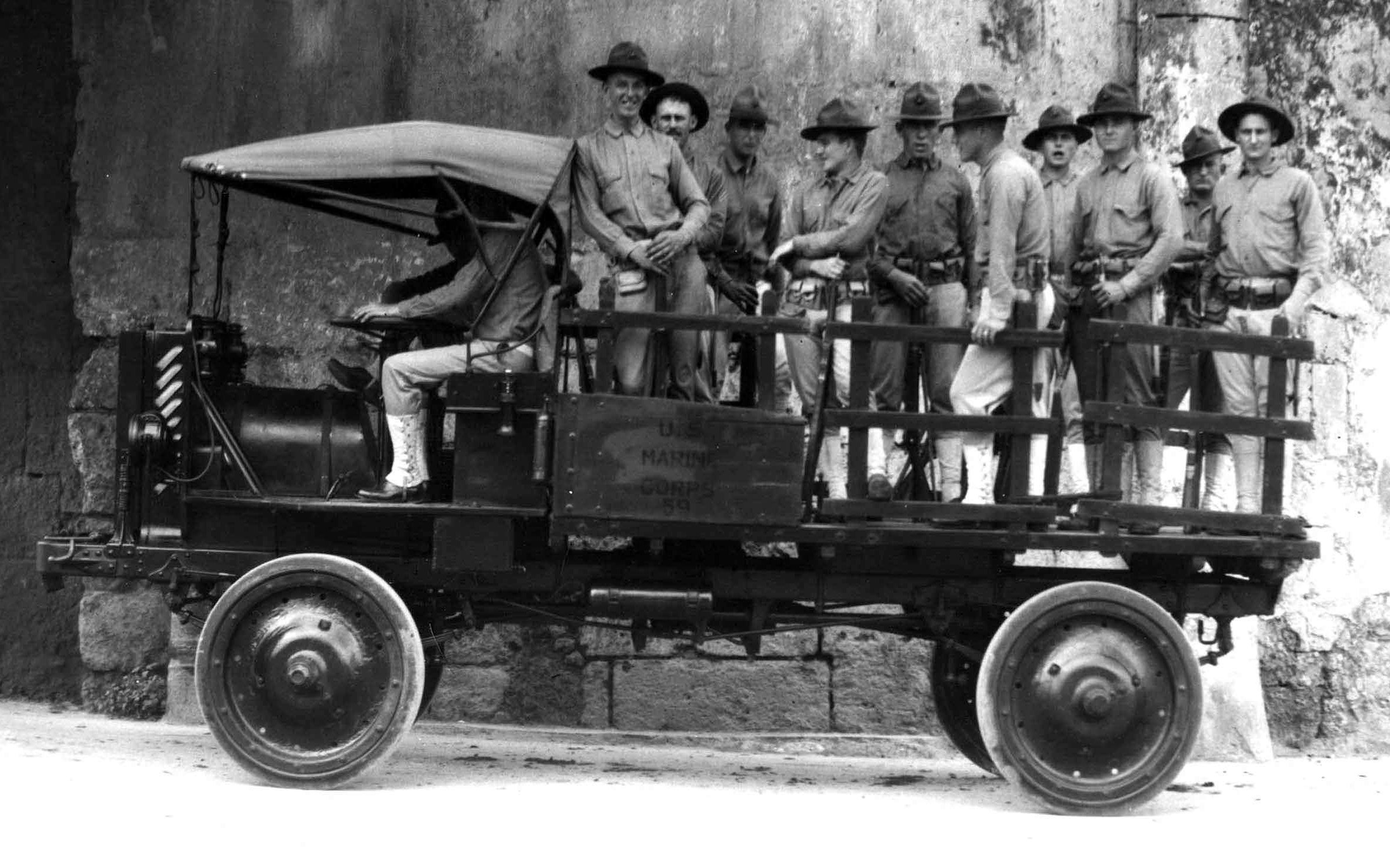
Jeffery/Nash Quad 2-ton 4x4

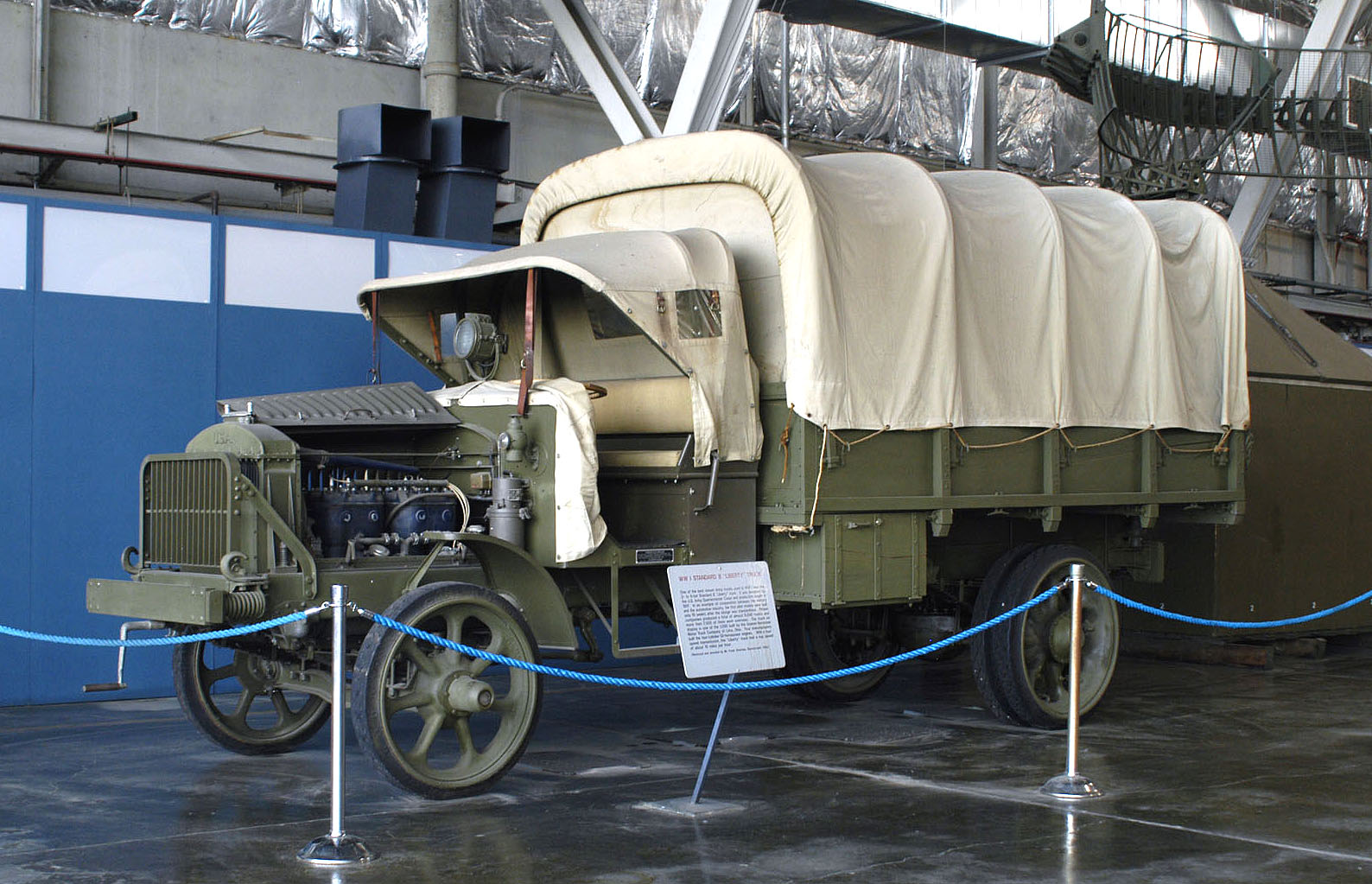
Liberty B 3-ton 4x2

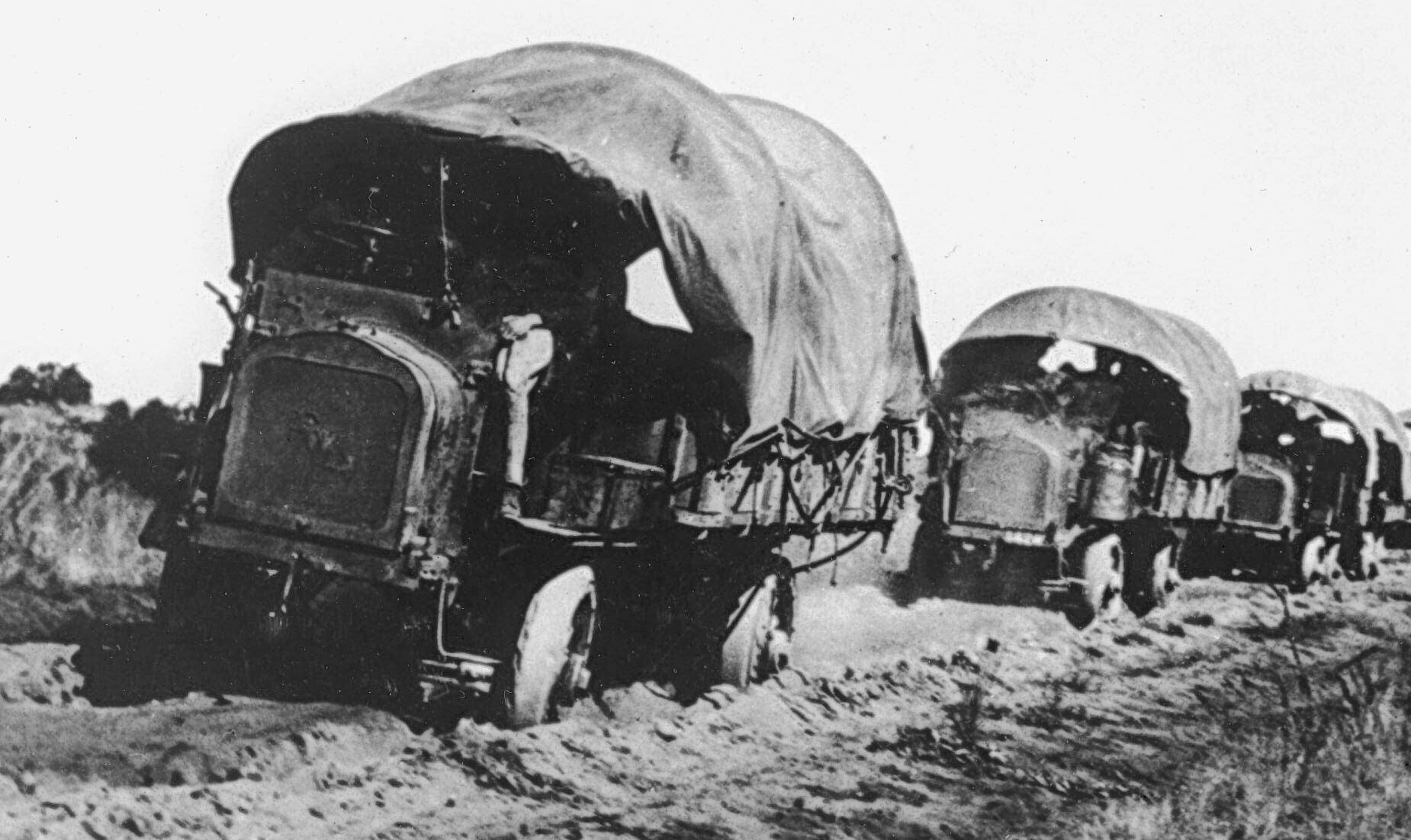
FWD B 3-ton 4x4

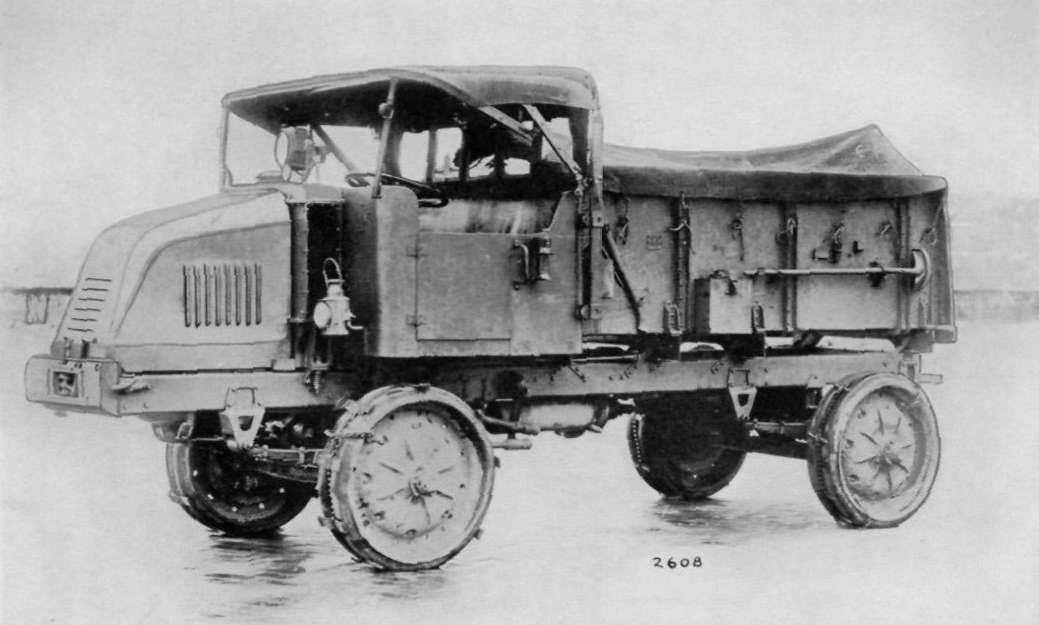
Ordnance standard 3-ton 4x4

Name and type	Build years	Total built	Notes
Dodge M1918; 1/2-ton 4x2	1918	1,012	Light repair truck for vehicles
White; 1 1/2-ton 4x2	1917–1919		Wide range of bodies
Jeffery/Nash Quad (Note: Also built by Hudson, National, and Paige-Detroit); 2-ton 4x4	1913–1928	11,500+	Early models had 4-wheel steering
Liberty truck 3-ton 4x2	1917–1918	9,452	built by 15 different manufacturers
FWD Model B (Note: Also built by Mitchel, Kissel, and Preimer.); 3-ton 4x4	1912–1920	16,000+	Wide range of bodies
Ordnance standard 3-ton 4x4	1918	150?	

== 1930 ==
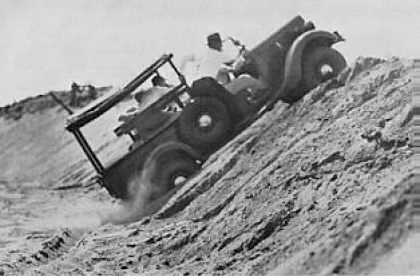
Marmon-Herrington 1/2-ton
(Model shown for Belgium)

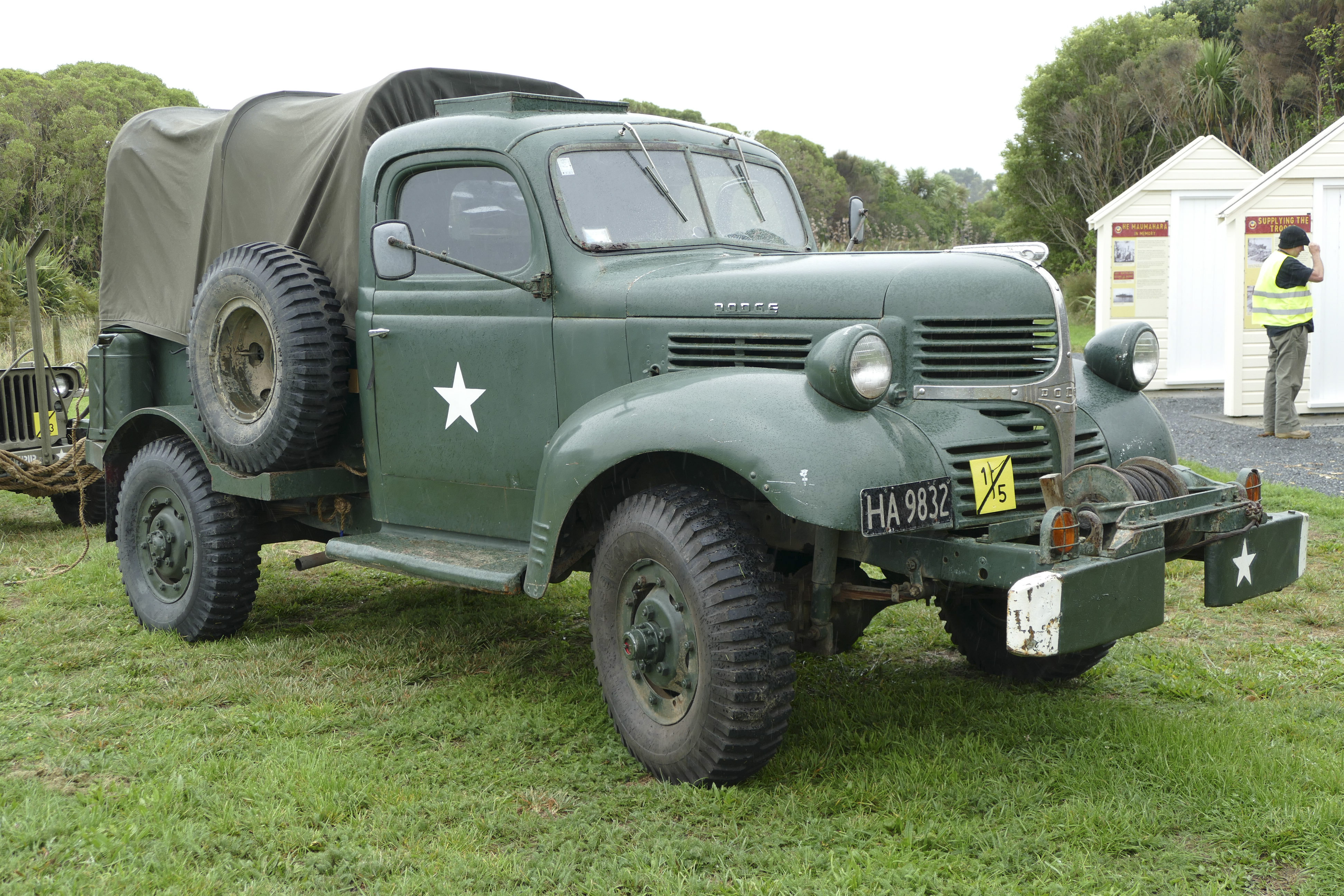
Dodge 1 1/4-ton 4x4
(1940 model)

Name and type	Build years	Total built	Notes
Ford / M.-H. (Note: Modified with driven front axle by Marmon-Herrington.); 1/2-ton 4x4	1939	Prototypes only	Light repair truck
Dodge; 1 1/2-ton 4x4	1939–1940		Wide range of bodies
FWD; 2-ton 4x4	1930	100+	Cargo and tank models
Indiana 16x4 2 1/2-ton 4x4	1934–1935		Open and closed cabs

== 1940 ==
In 1939–1941, the US Army Quartermaster Corps was developing a full, and largely standardized line of tactical trucks, that could all operate off-road, and in all weather. In 1941, trucks of 1/4-ton, 1/2-ton, 1 1/2-ton, and 3-ton load capacity, (4x4), and of 2 1/2-ton, 4-ton, and 7 1/2-tons, (6x6), were in production, and several other types had been added. These trucks were designated by chassis type, followed by their manufacturer and model. Early use of "M" numbers relate to the body and not the truck itself. During WW II, "M" numbers began to be used for new trucks as well. In 1945, all truck production halted.

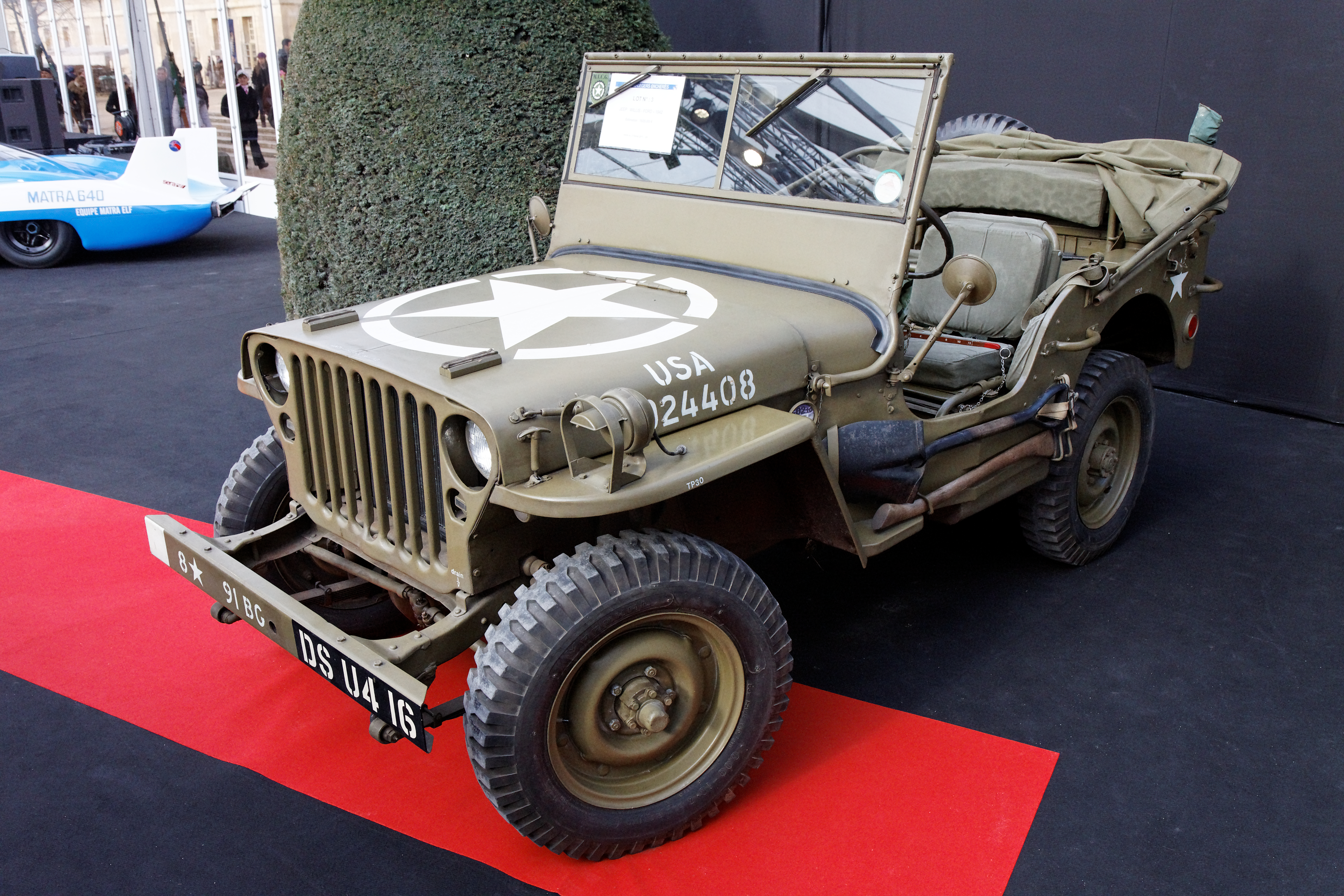
Willys MB 1/4-ton 4x4

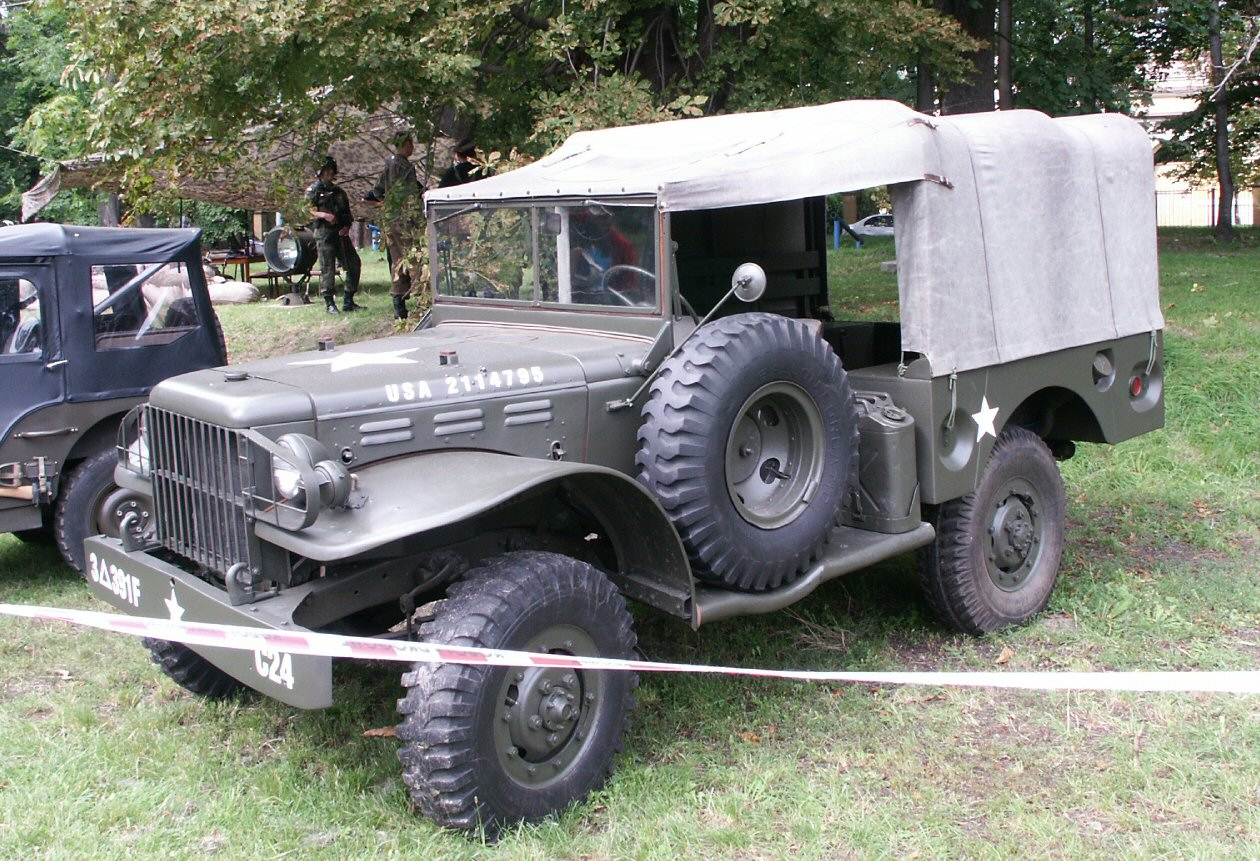
Dodge WC51 3/4-ton 4x4

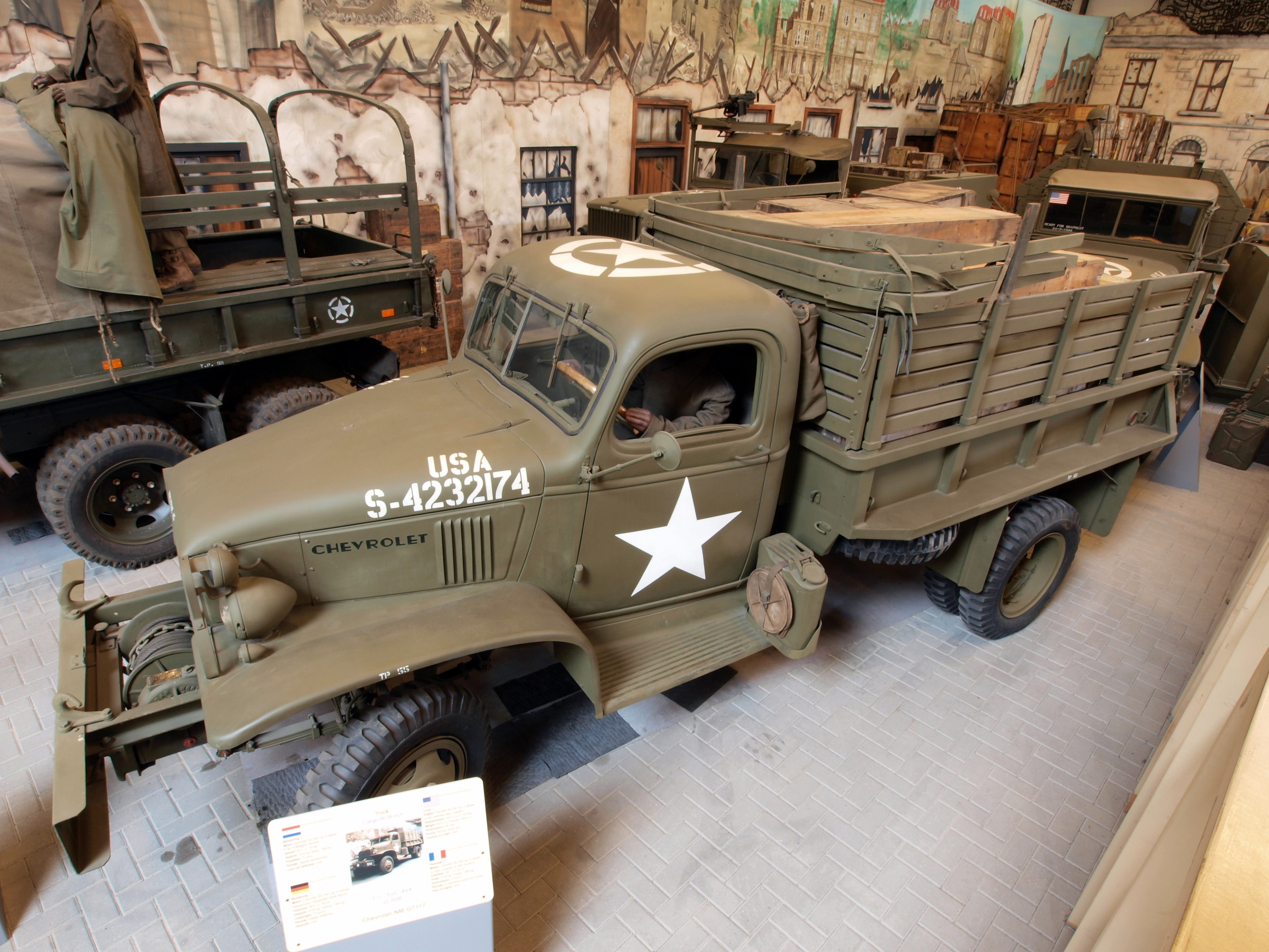
Chevrolet G-506 1 1/2-ton 4x4

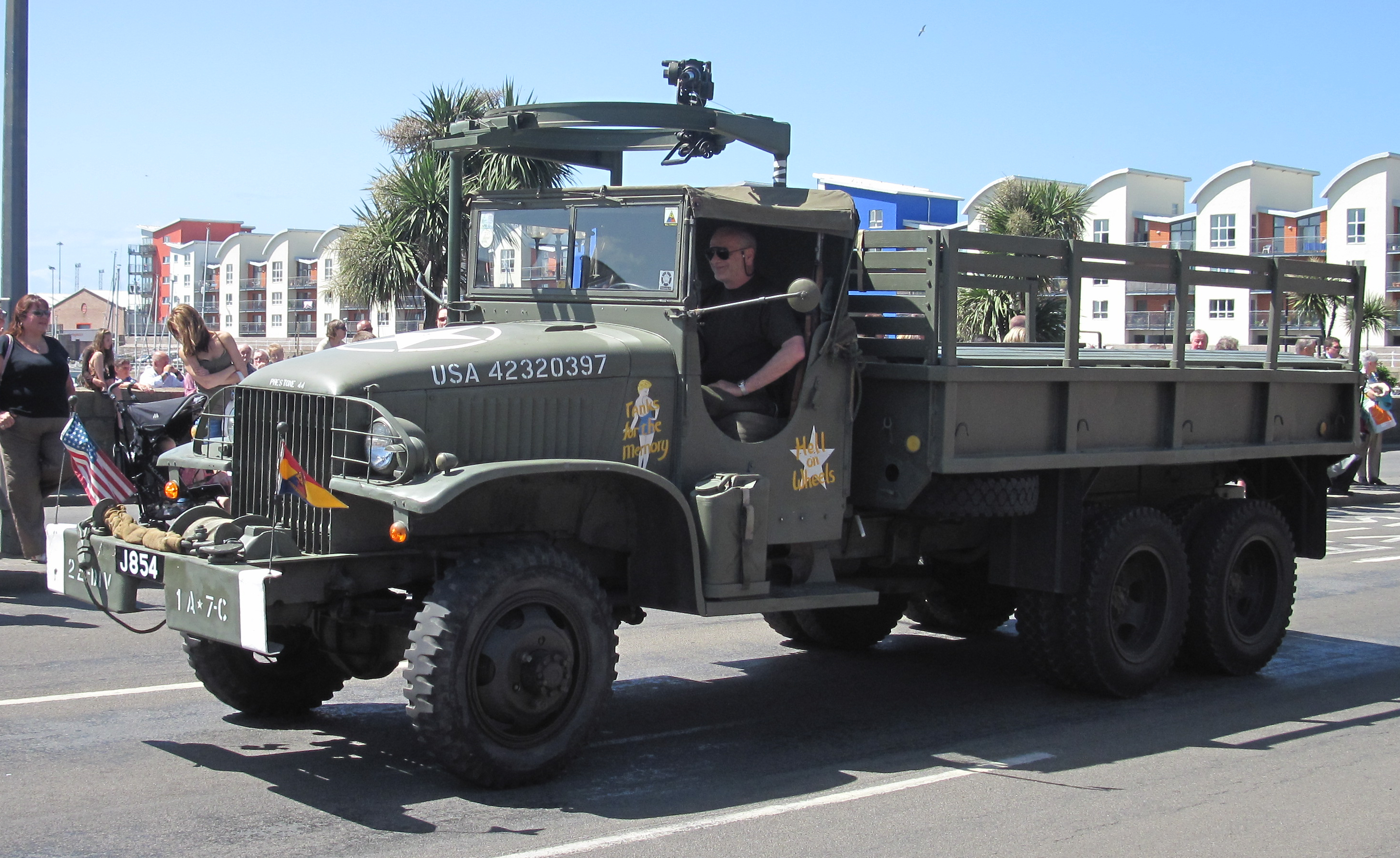
GMC CCKW 2 1/2-ton 6x6

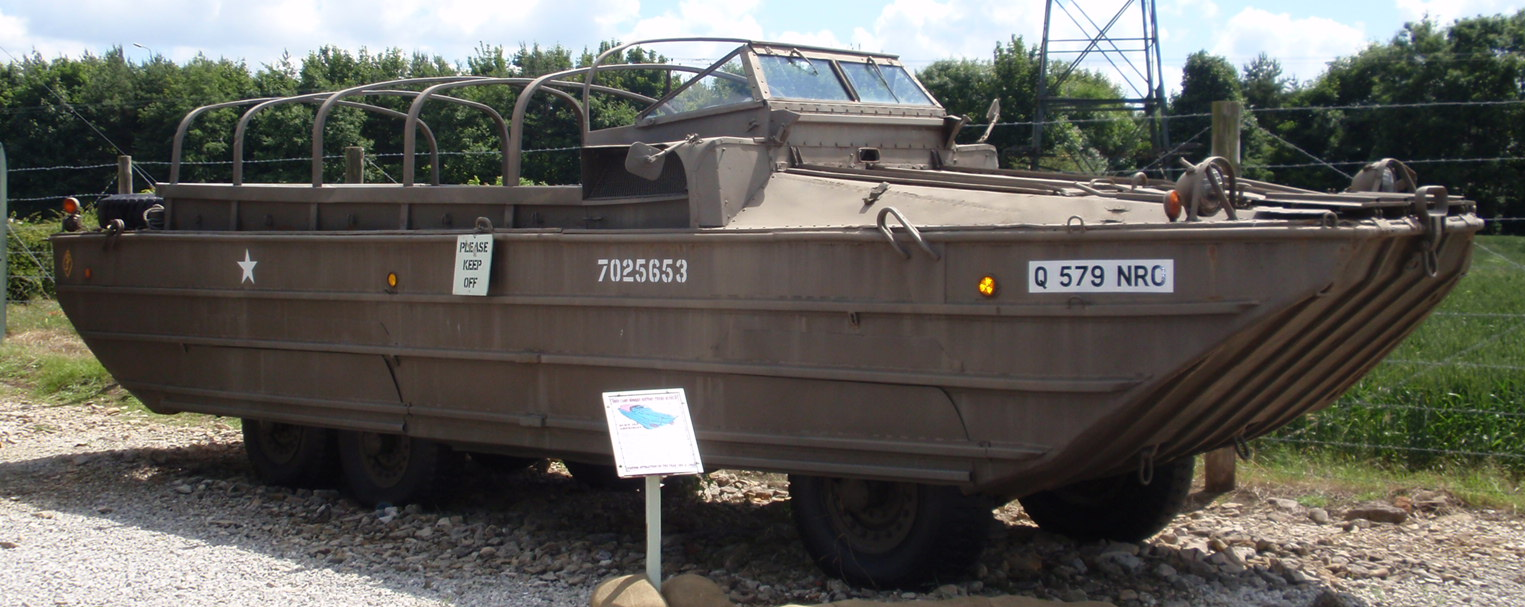
GMC DUKW 2 1/2-ton 6x6

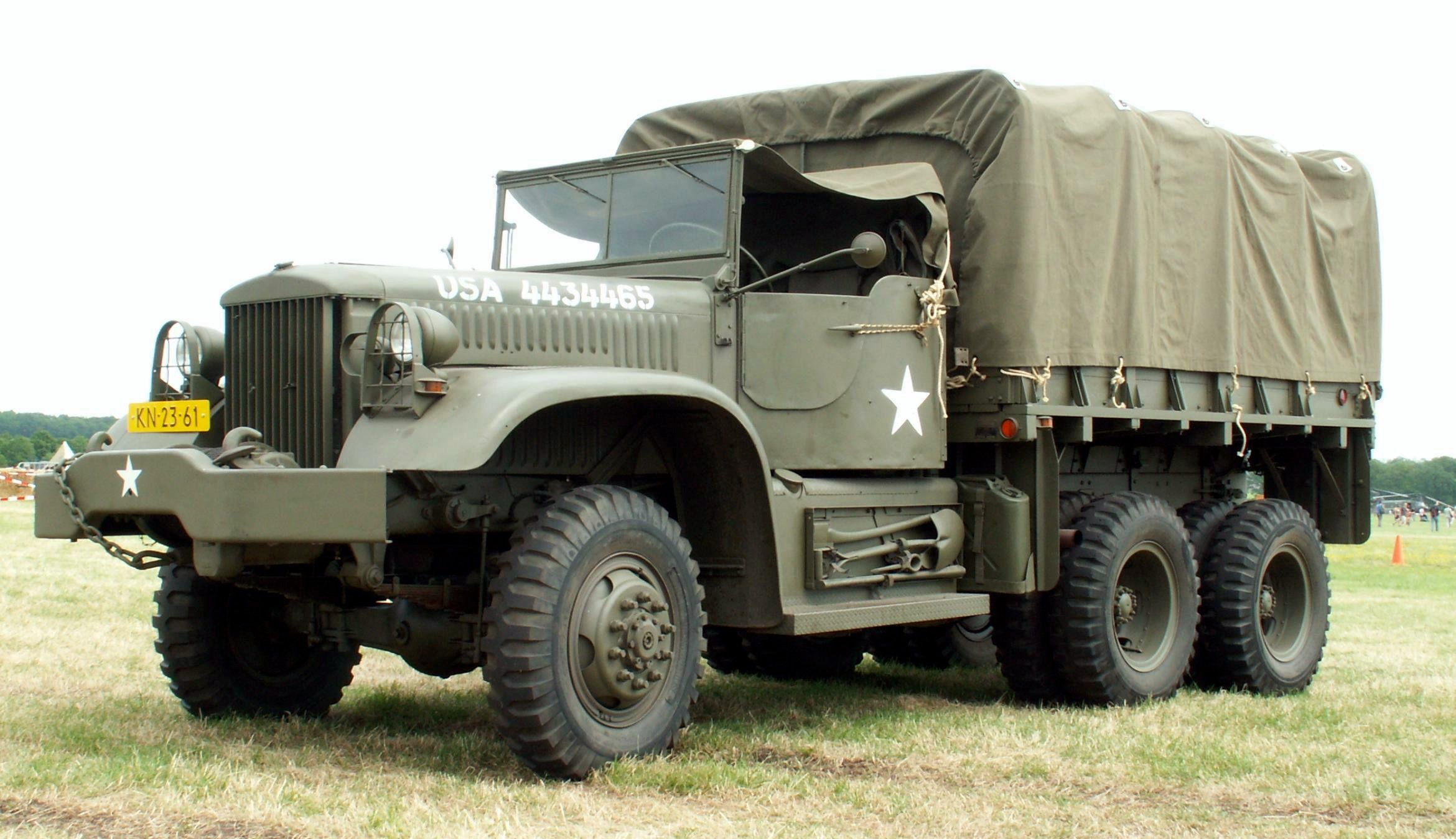
Diamond T 968 4-ton 6x6

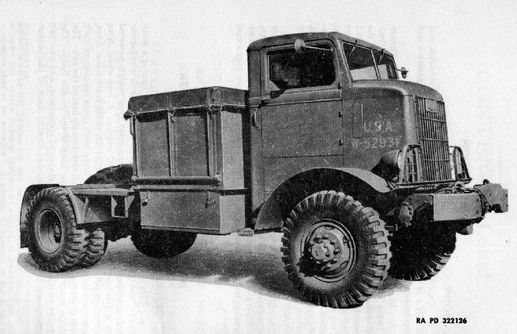
Autocar U88144T 5-6 ton 4x4

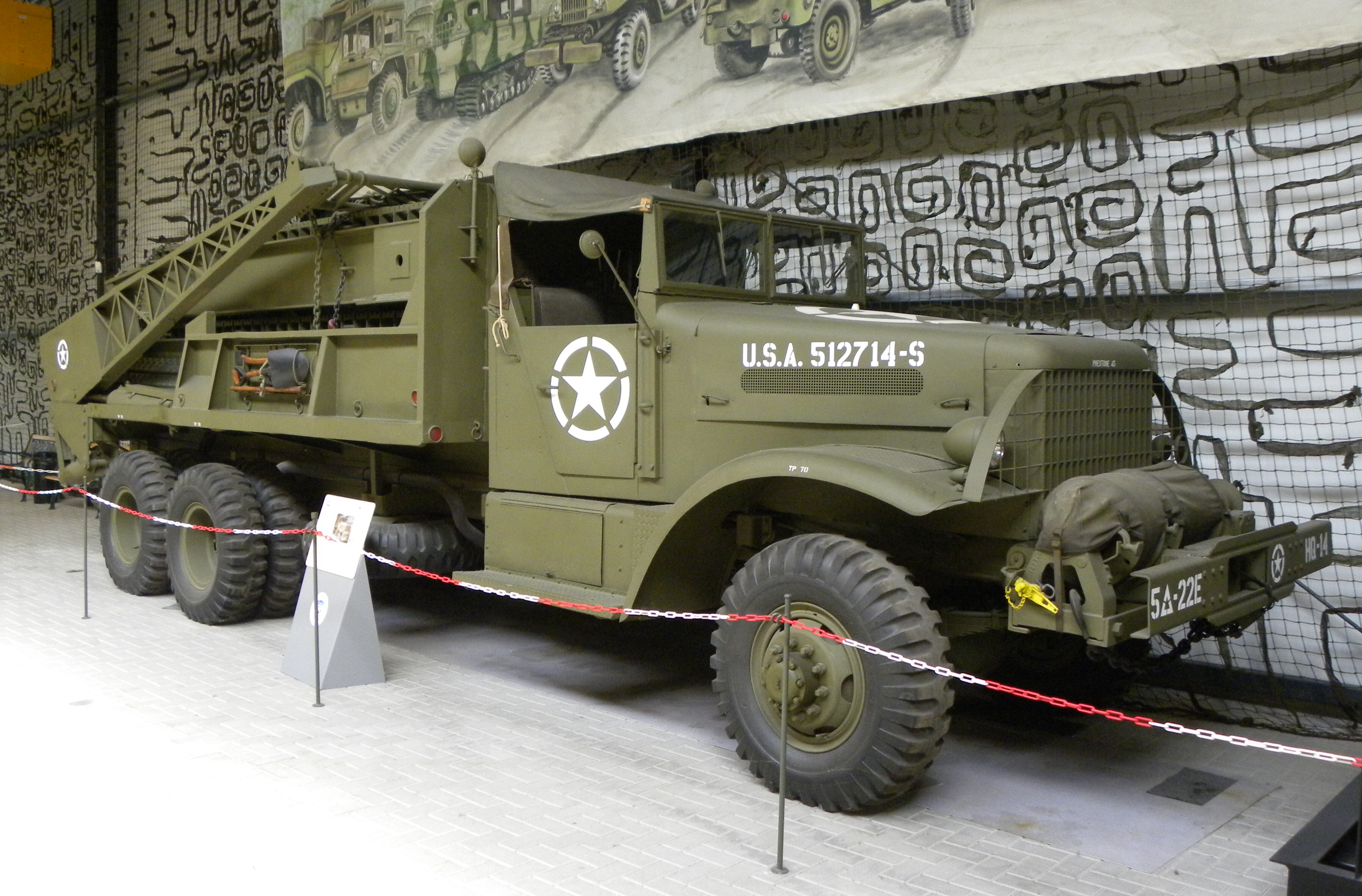
Brockway B666 6-ton 6x6

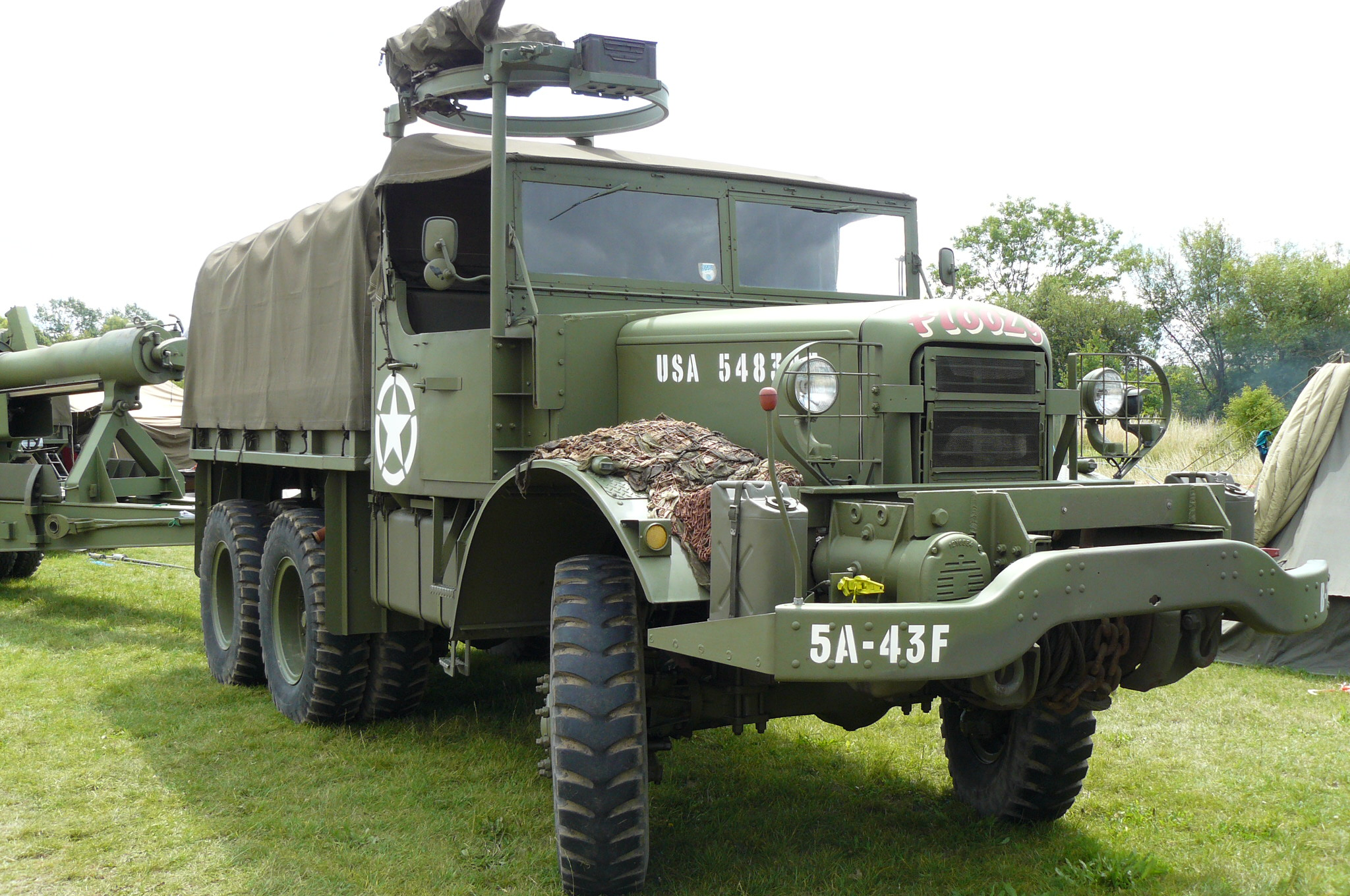
Mack NO 7 1/2-ton 6x6

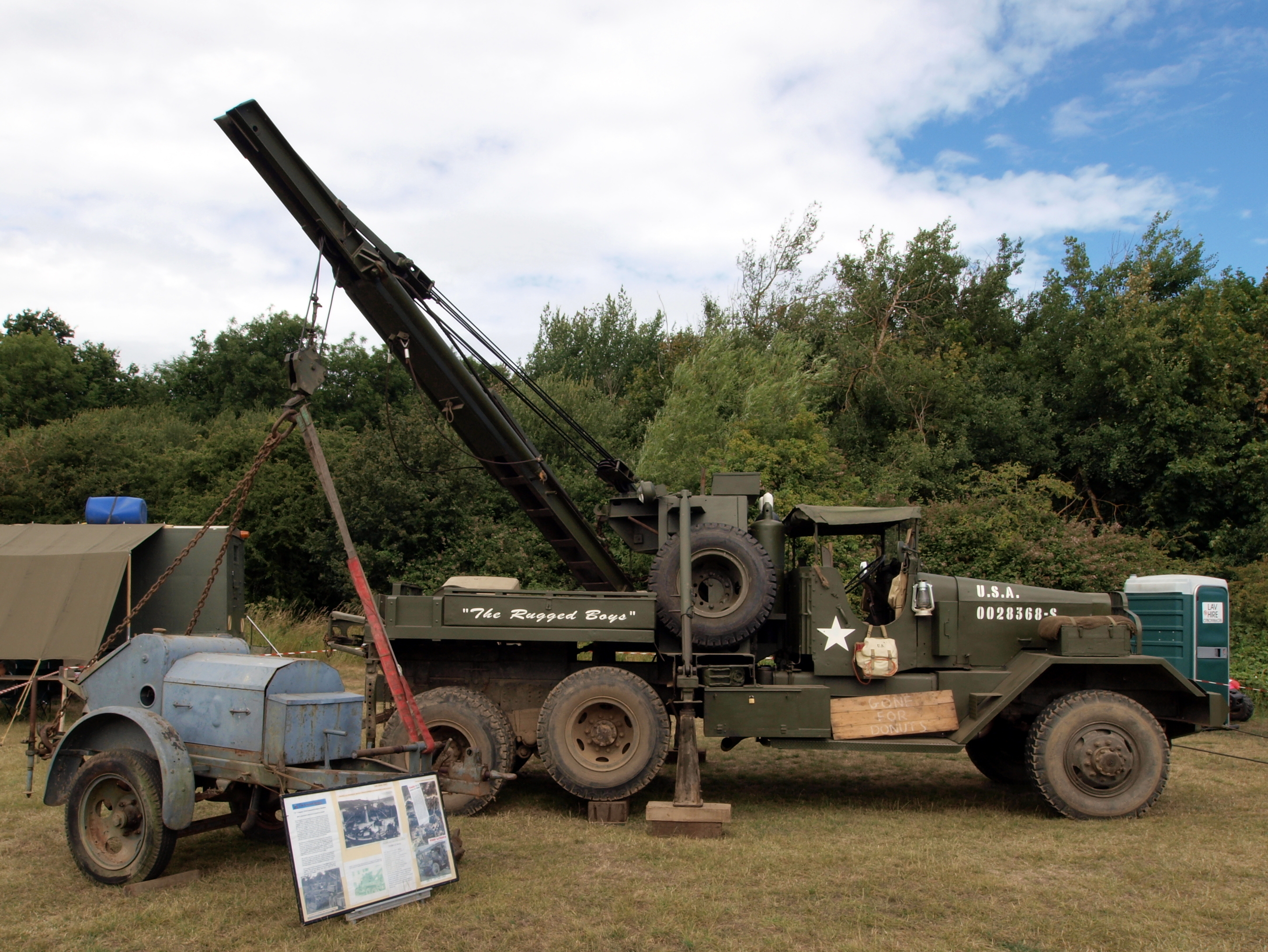
M1A1 10-ton 6x6 wrecker

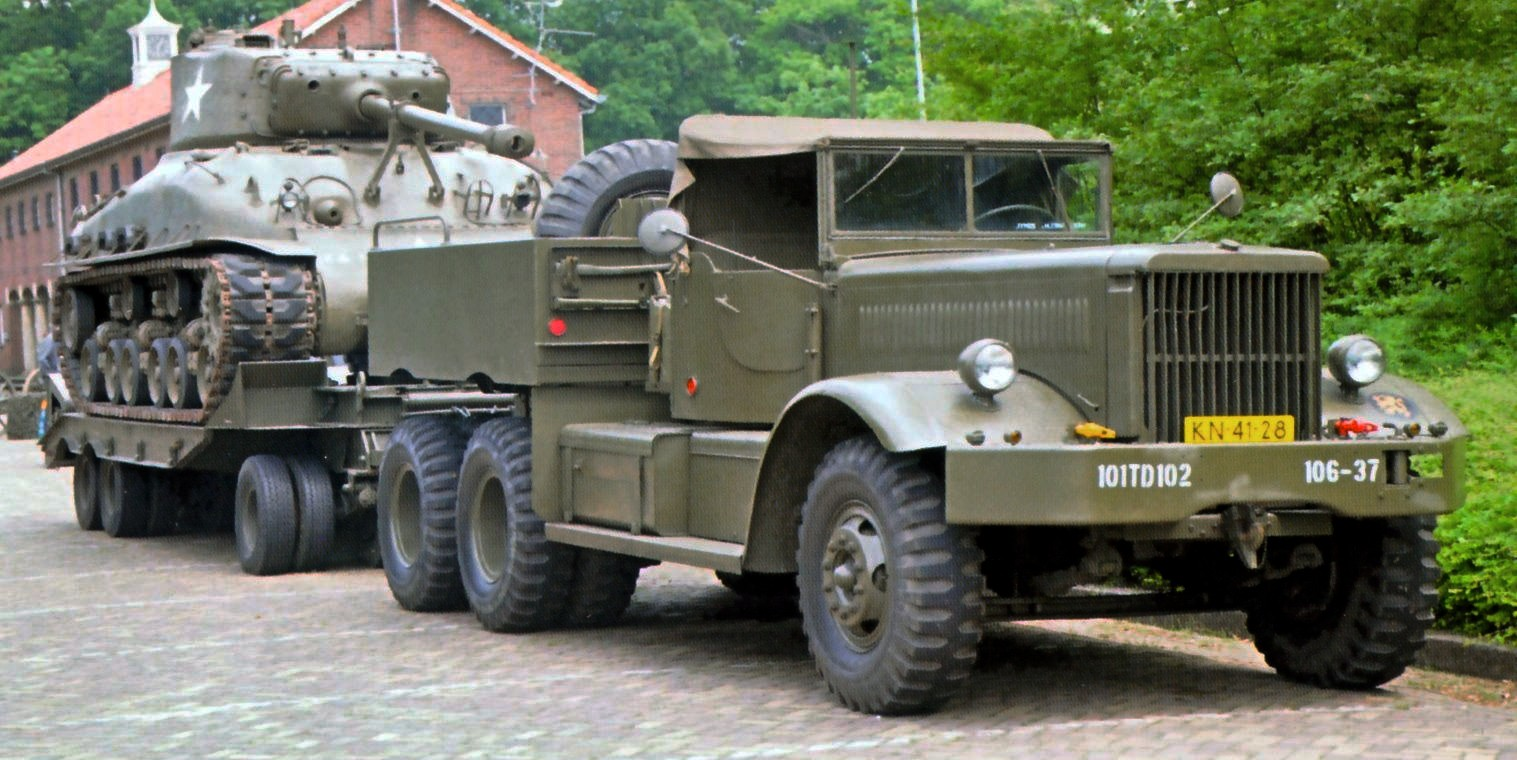
Diamond T Model 981 12-ton 6x4

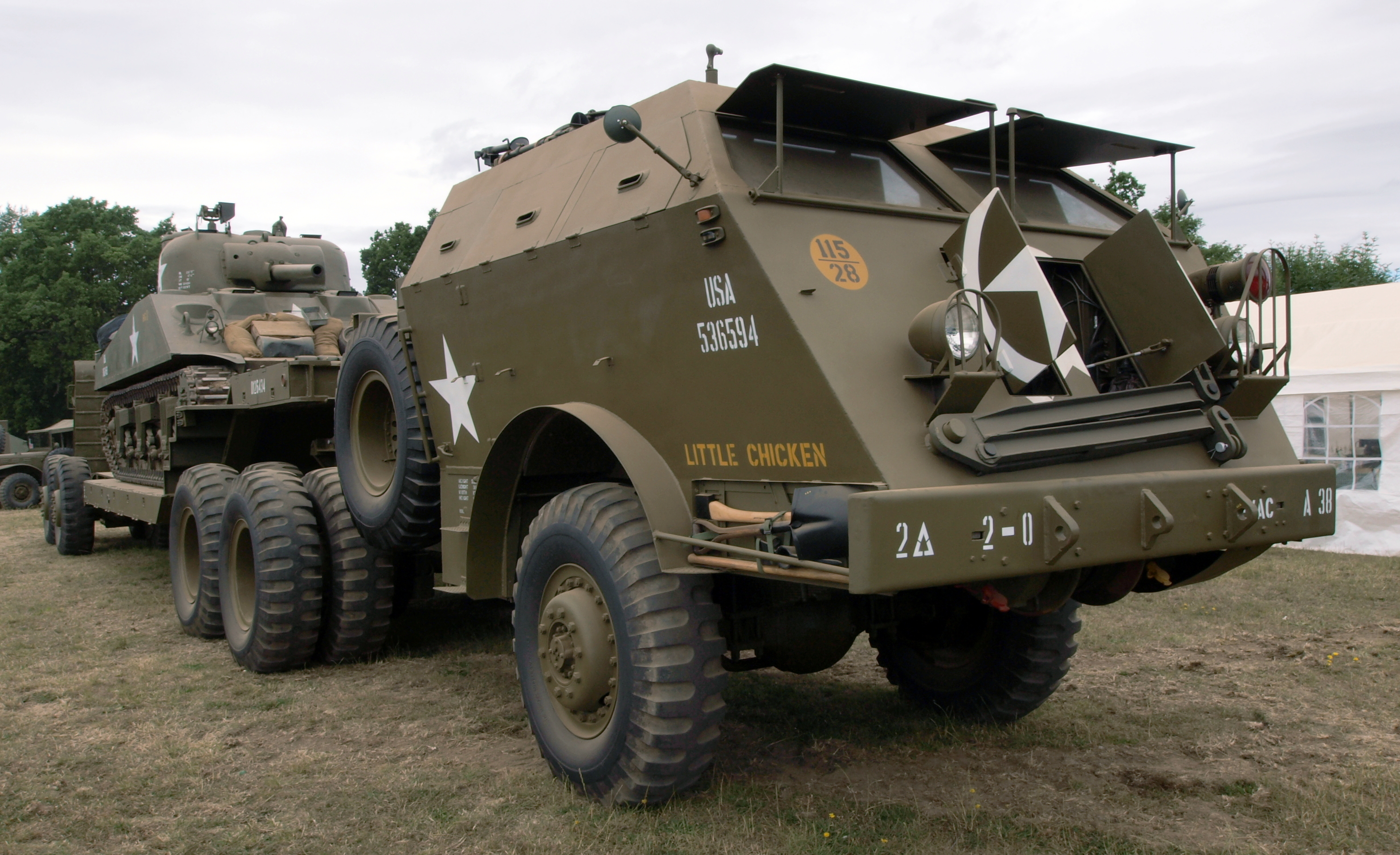
M26 12-ton 6x6

Name and type	Build years	Total built	Notes
Willys MB (Note: Also built as Ford GPW); 1/4-ton 4x4	1941–1945	639,000+	Also built by Ford as GPW; First "jeep" in the current meaning of the word
Dodge WC; 1/2-3/4 ton 4x4	1941–1945	255,000+	10+ bodies
Chevrolet G506; 1 1/2-ton 4x4	1940–1945	168,603	15 bodies
GMC CCKW (Note: Also built by Chevrolet); 2 1/2-ton 6x6	1941–1945	562,750	12+ bodies "Deuce and a Half", "Jimmy".
GMC DUKW; 2 1/2-ton 6x6	1942–1945	21,147	Amphibious version of CCKW "Duck"
Studebaker US6 (Note: Also built by REO.); 2 1/2-ton 6x6	1941–1945	219,882	8 bodies
Diamond T 968; 4-ton 6x6	1940–1945	30,000	Cargo, dump, wrecker and specialty bodies
Autocar U8144T; 5-6 ton 4x4	1941–1945	2,711	Semi-tractor for pontoon bridges
Mack NJU; 5-6 ton 4x4	1941–1942	692	Semi-tractor for pontoon bridges
Brockway B666 (Note: Also built by Corbitt (designer), FWD, Ward LaFrance, and White); 6-ton 6x6	1941–1945	219,882	Bridge, crane, cargo fire, van and others by 5 manufacturers
Mack NM; 6-ton 6x6	1940–1944	8,400+	Prime mover cargo truck
Mack NO; 7 1/2-ton 6x6	1943–1945	2,050	Prime mover cargo truck
M1 Wrecker; 10-ton 6x6	1941–1945	5,765	Standard heavy wrecker during WWII; Built by Ward LaFrance and Kenworth.
Diamond T 980; 12-ton 6x4	1941–1945	6,554	Tractor for M19 tank transporter
Pacific M26; 12-ton 6x6	1943–1945	1,372	Semi-tractor for M25 tank transporter "Dragon Wagon"

== 1950 ==
In 1950 the next generation of tactical trucks were being developed. Sizes were rationalized, with 1/4 and 3/4-ton 4x4s and 2 1/2, 5, and 10-ton 6x6s. Trucks were military standard designs, 6x6 trucks used common cabs and similar fender and hood styles.

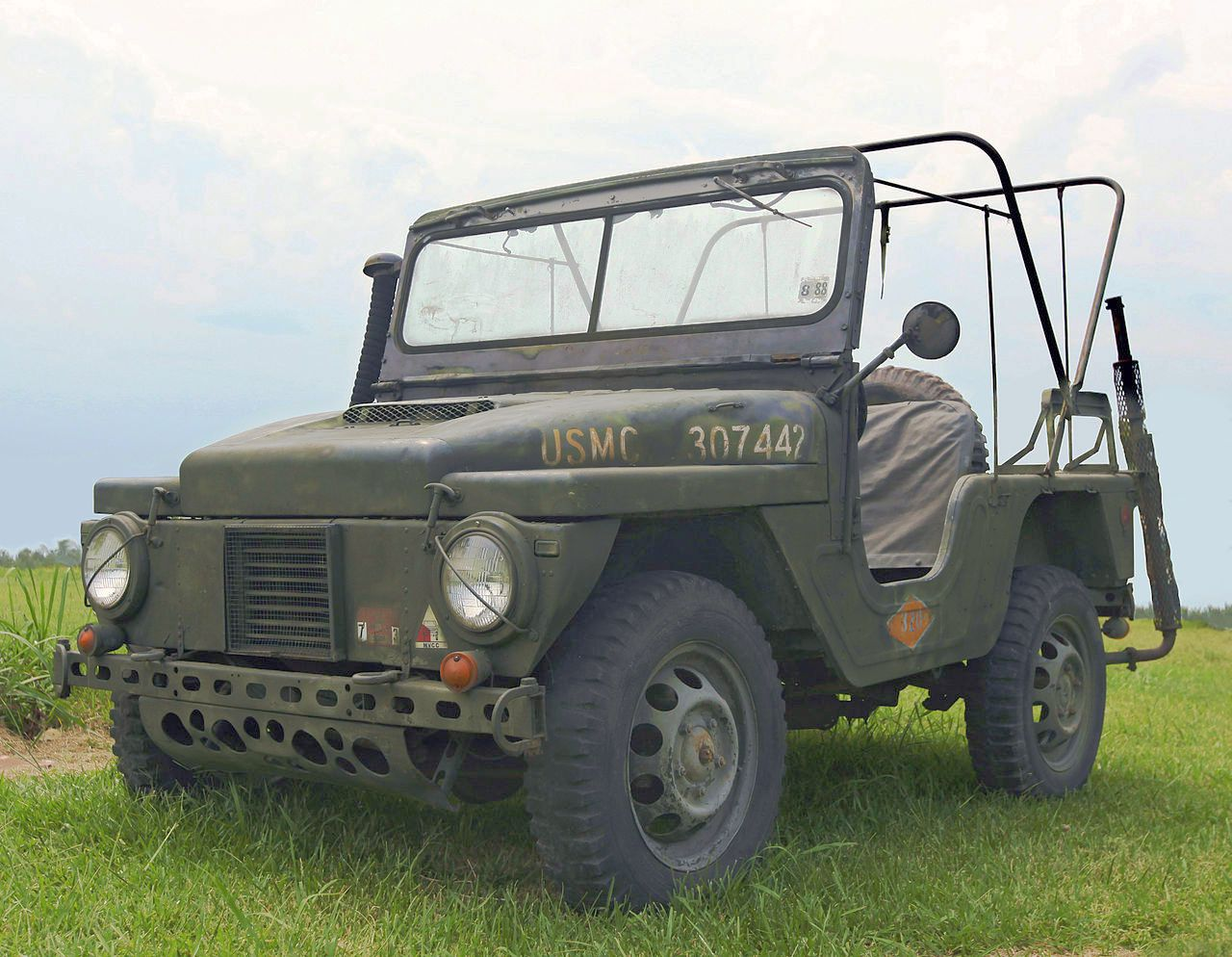
M422 1/4-ton 4x4

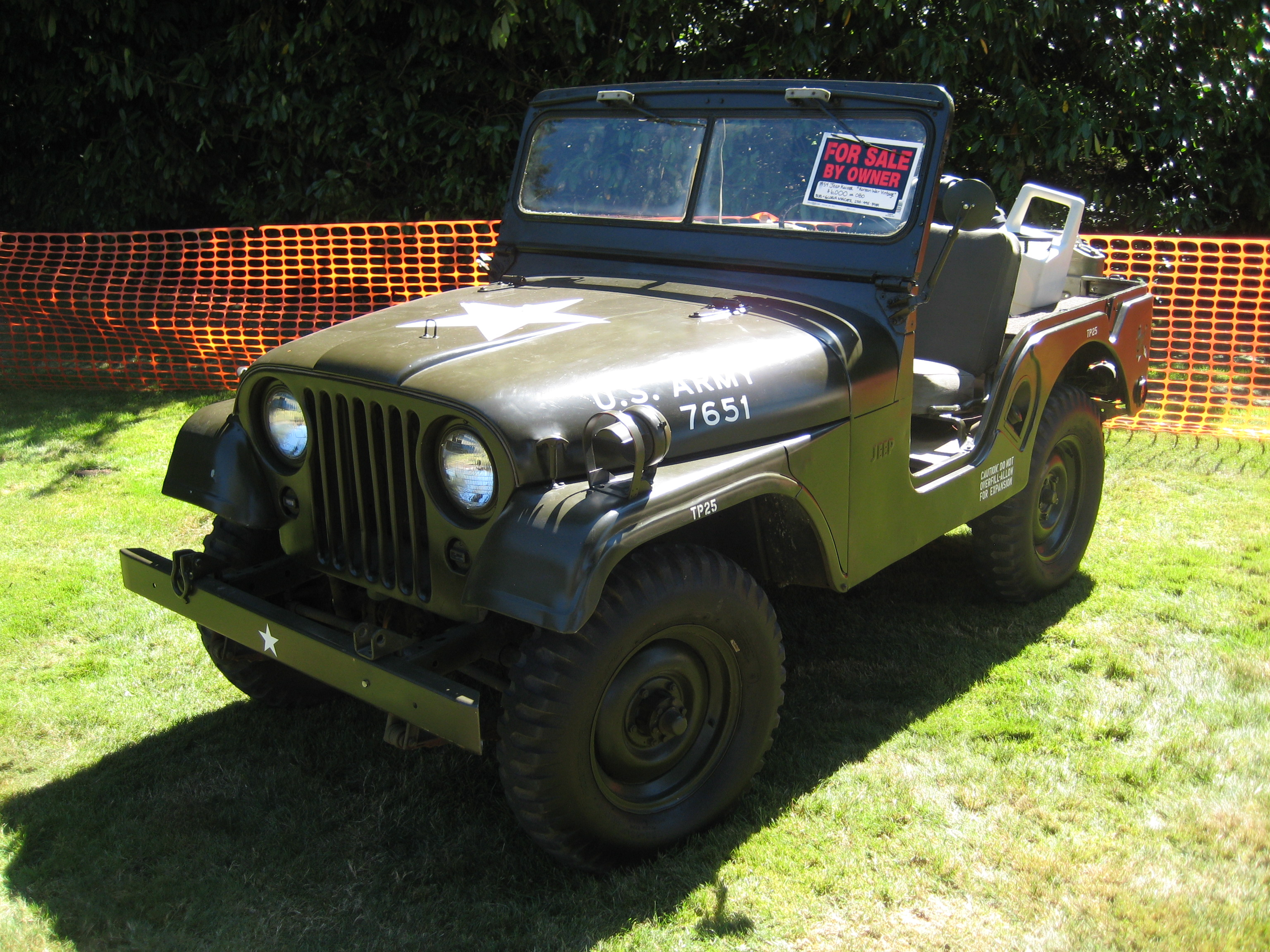
M38A1 1/4-ton 4x4

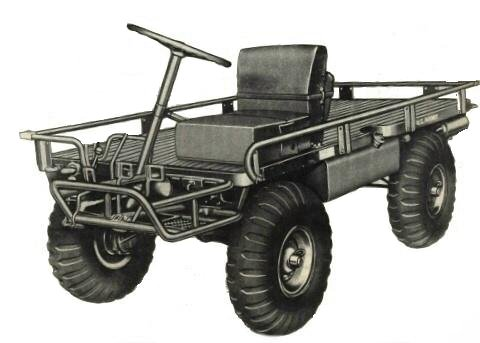
M274 1/2-ton 4x4

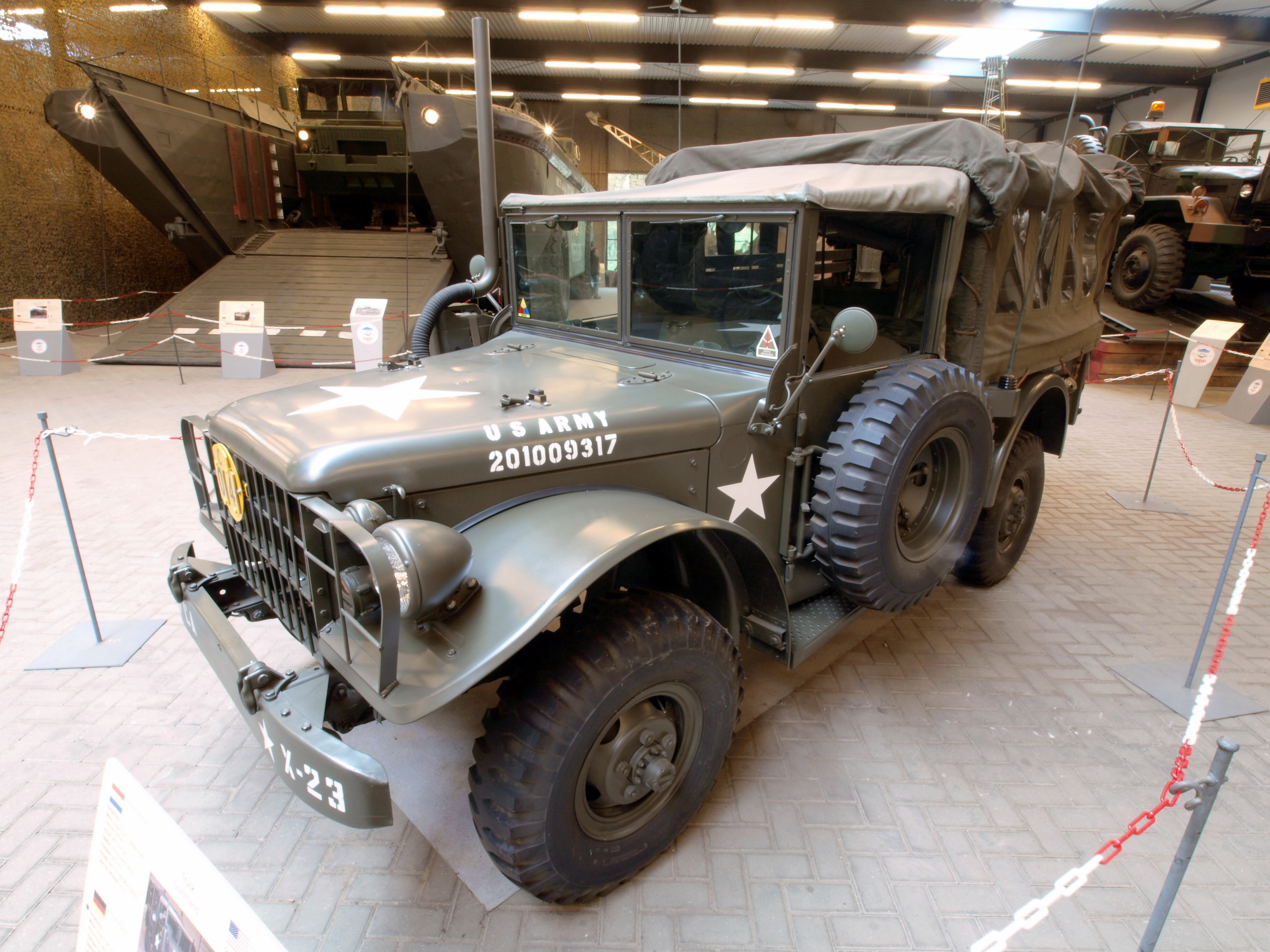
M37 3/4-ton 4x4

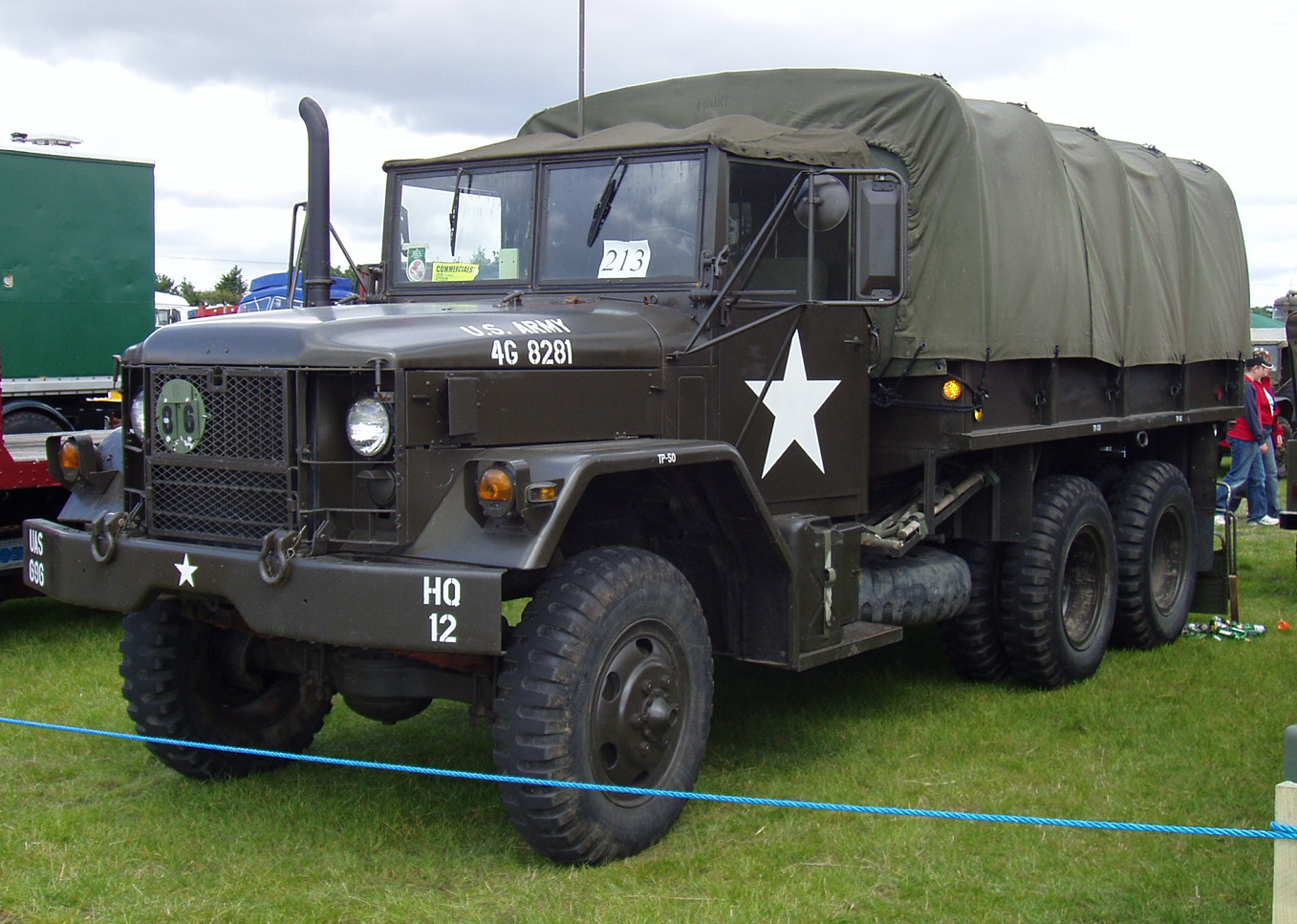
M35 2 1/2-ton 6x6

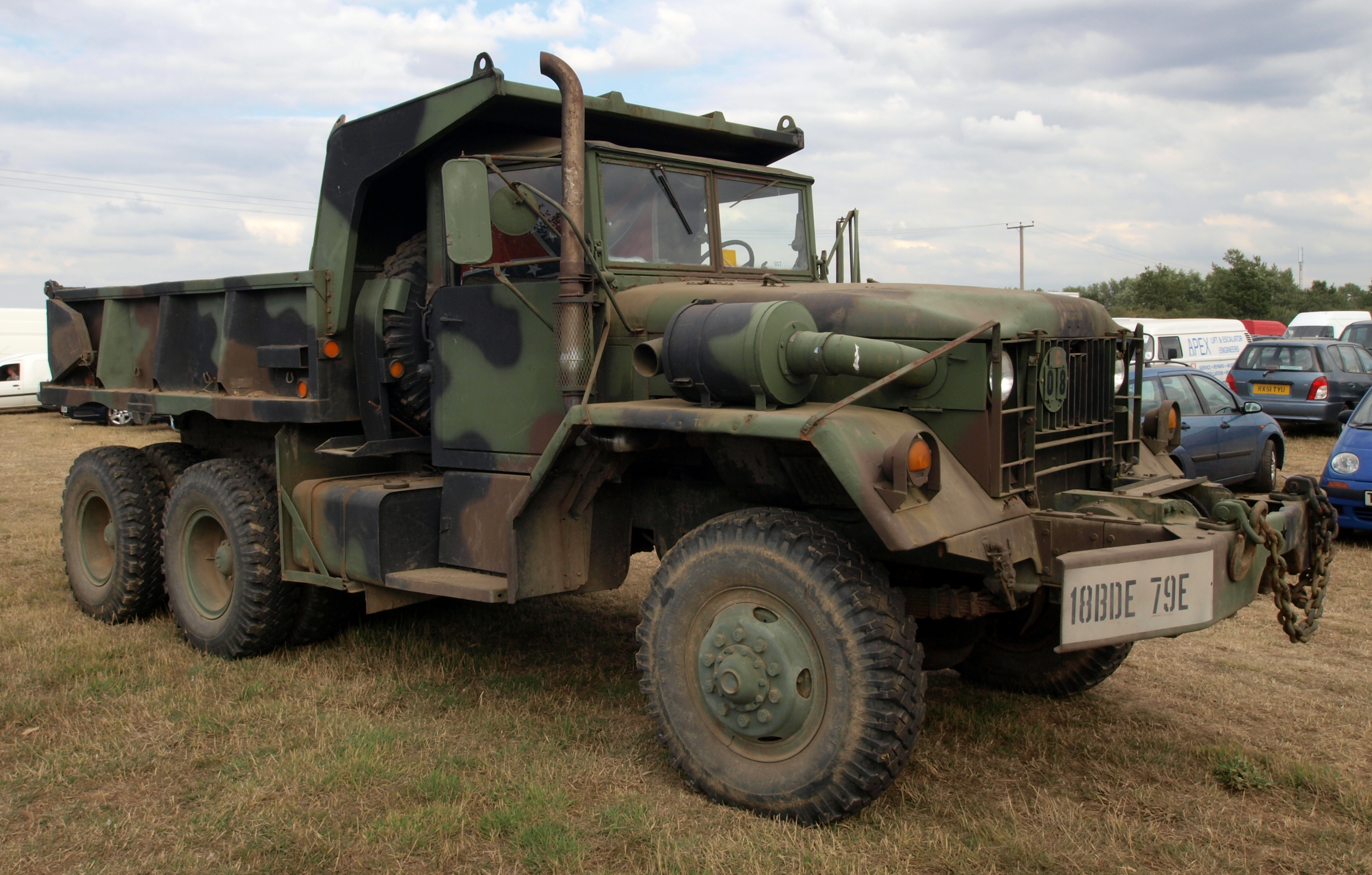
M51 5-ton 6x6

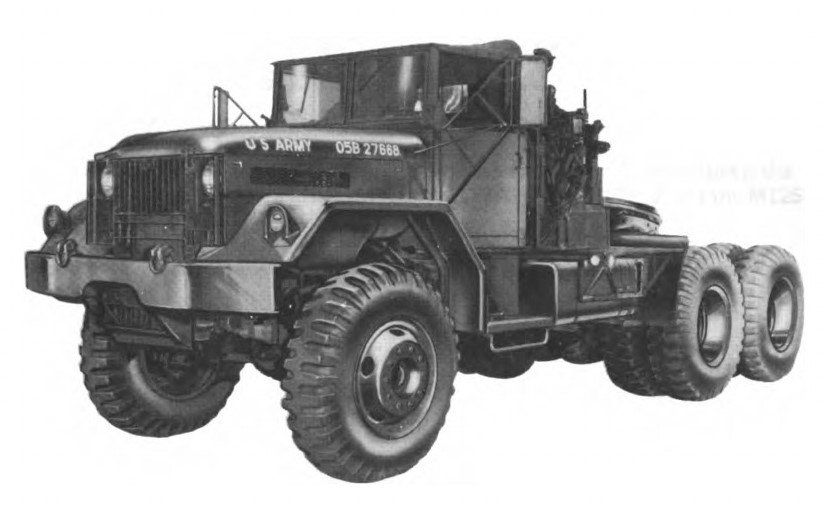
M123 10-ton 6x6

Name and type	Build years	Total built	Notes
M422; 1/4-ton 4x4	1959–1962	3,992	USMC lightweight utility truck "Mighty Mite"
M38A1; 1/4-ton 4x4	1952–1971		Light utility truck "Jeep"
M274; 1/2-ton 4x4	1959		USMC Platform utility truck "Mule"
M37 Series; 3/4-ton 4x4	1951–1968	136,220	10 bodies "Power Wagon"
M35 Series; 2 1/2-ton 6x6	1950–1988	173,700 (Note: Includes all built by 10 manufacturers.)	8+ bodies by 6 manufactures
M54 Series; 5-ton 6x6	1951–1965	156,900 (Note: Includes International Harvester, Diamond T, Kaiser Jeep, and Mack built.)	Cargo, dump, tractor, van, wrecker, and others.
M123/M125; 10-ton 6x6	1955–1969	4,132	semi-tractor for tank transporter prime mover cargo truck

== 1960 ==
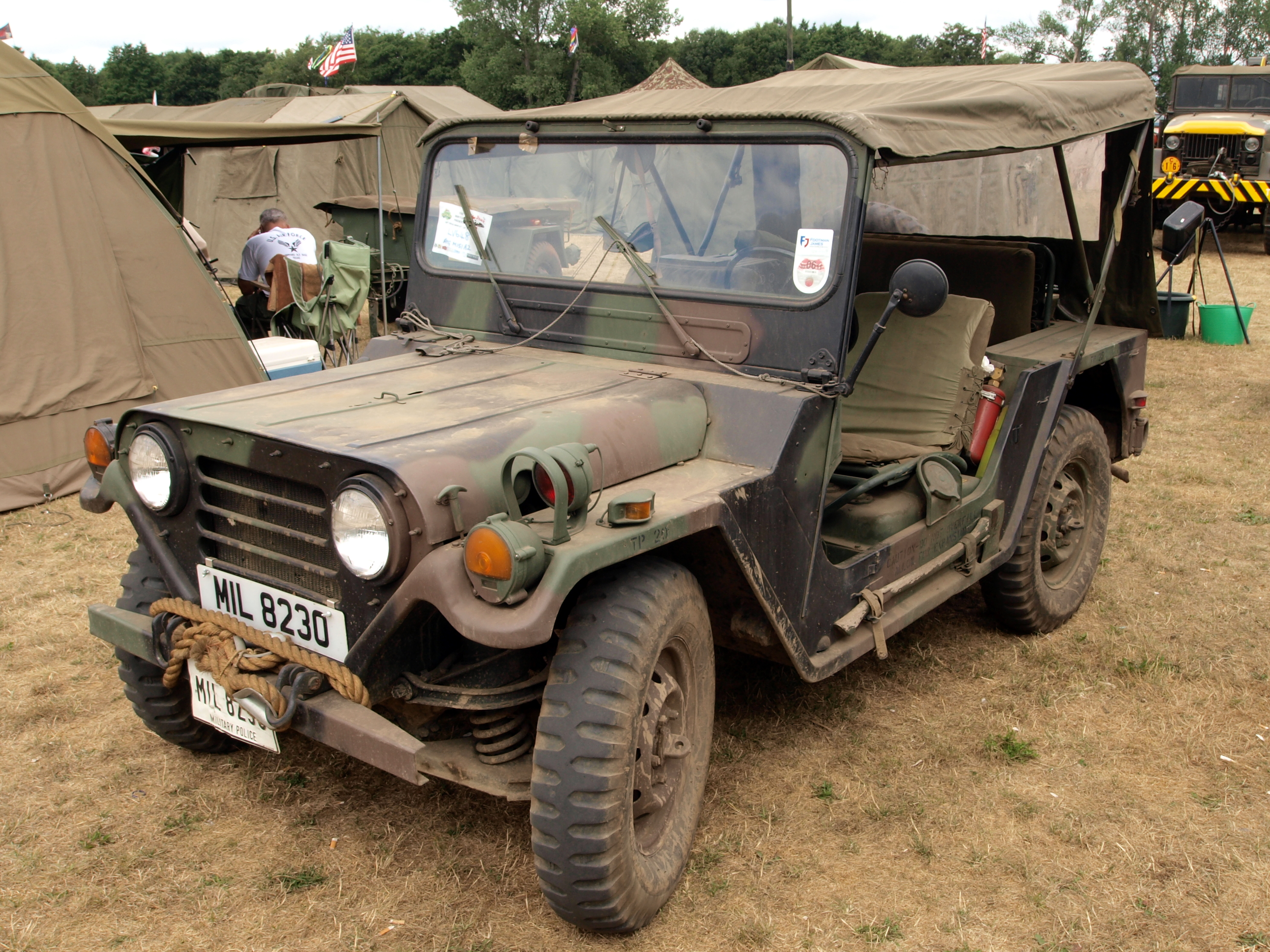
M151 1/4-ton 4x4

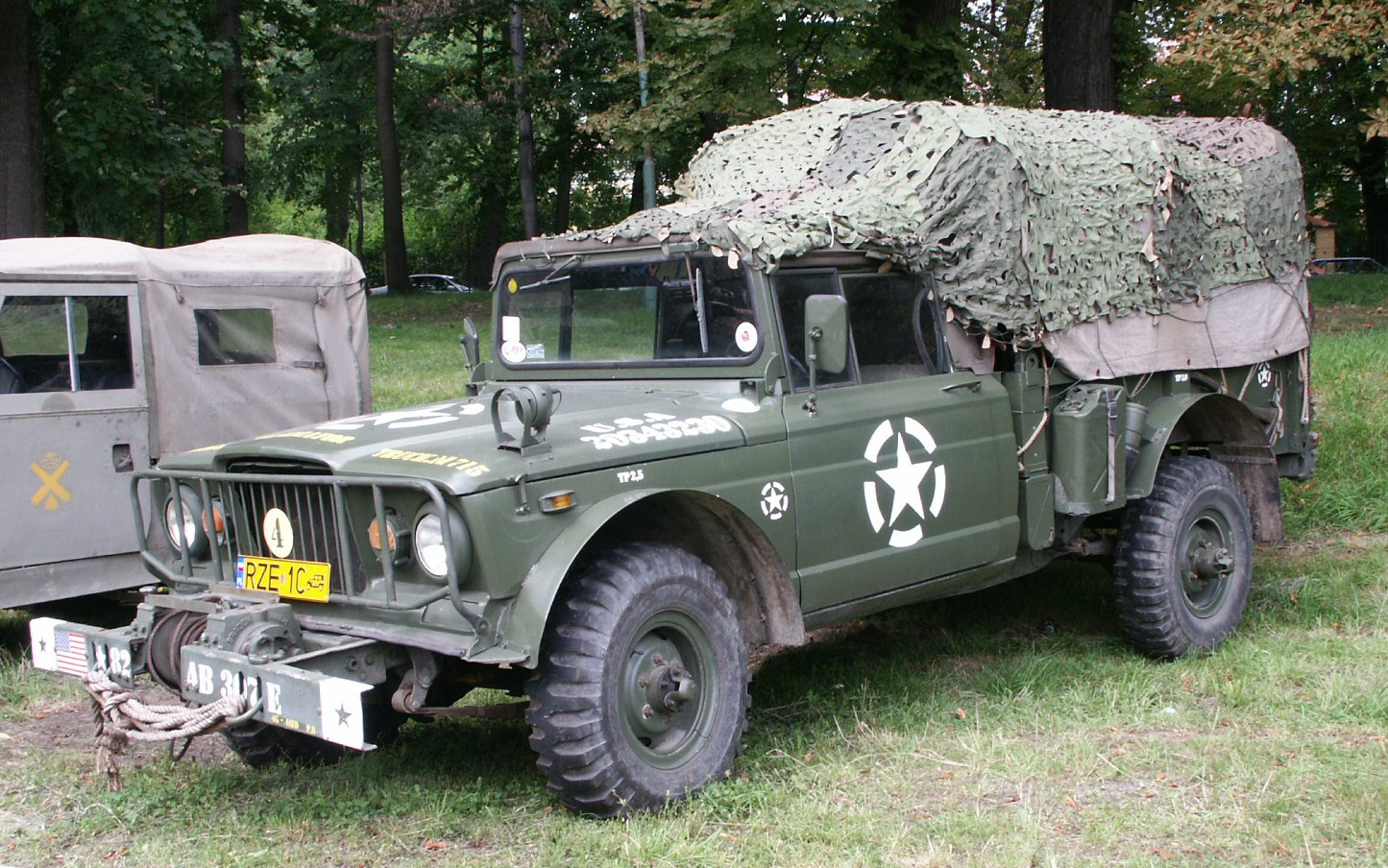
M715 1 1/4-ton 4x4

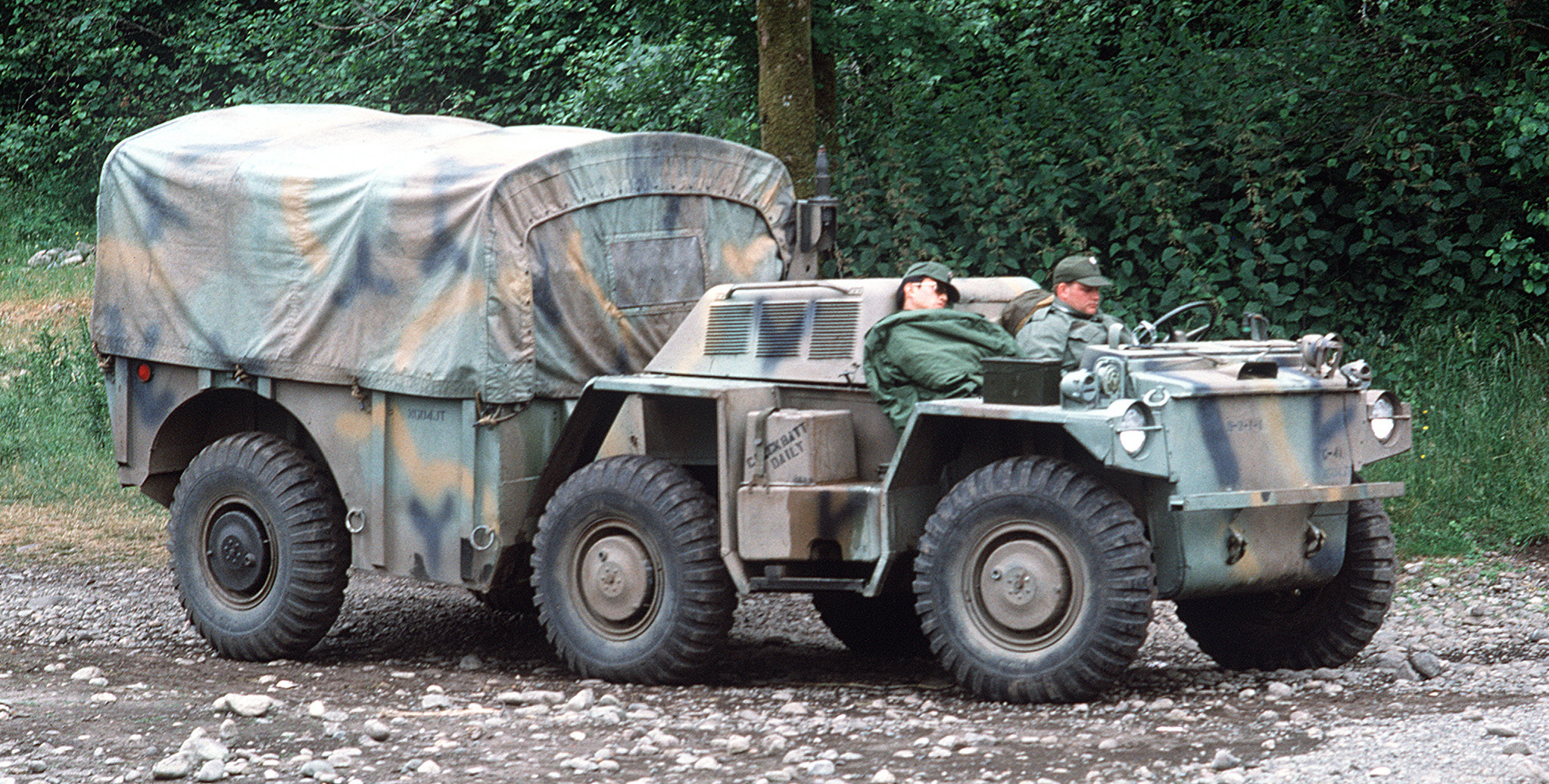
M561 1 1/4-ton 6x6

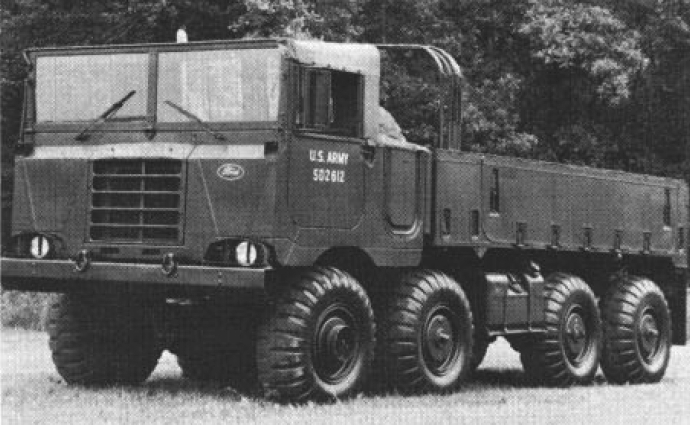
M656 5-ton 8x8

Name and type	Build years	Total built	Notes
M151; 1/4-ton 4x4	1960–1988	103,700 (Note: Includes Ford and Willys/Kaiser Jeep/AM General built.)	1/4-ton utility jeep
M715 series 1 1/4-ton 4x4	1967–1969	30,553	Ambulance, cargo, utility bodies (Modified Jeep J-series truck)
M561; 1 1/4-ton 6x6	1968	14,274	Cargo and ambulance bodies "Gamma Goat"
M656 Series; 5-ton 8x8	1968–1969		3 bodies for Pershing Missile System

== 1970 ==
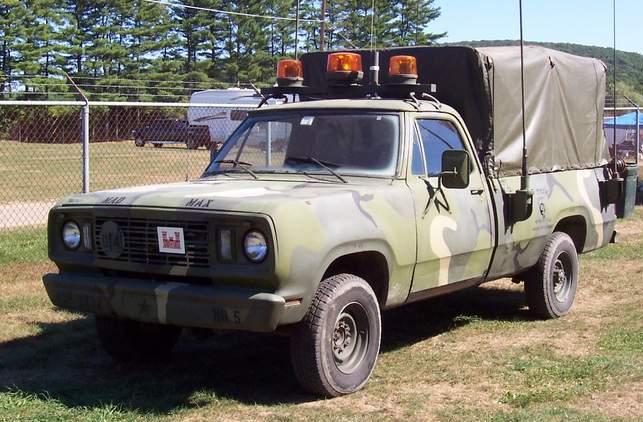
M880 1/4-ton 4x4

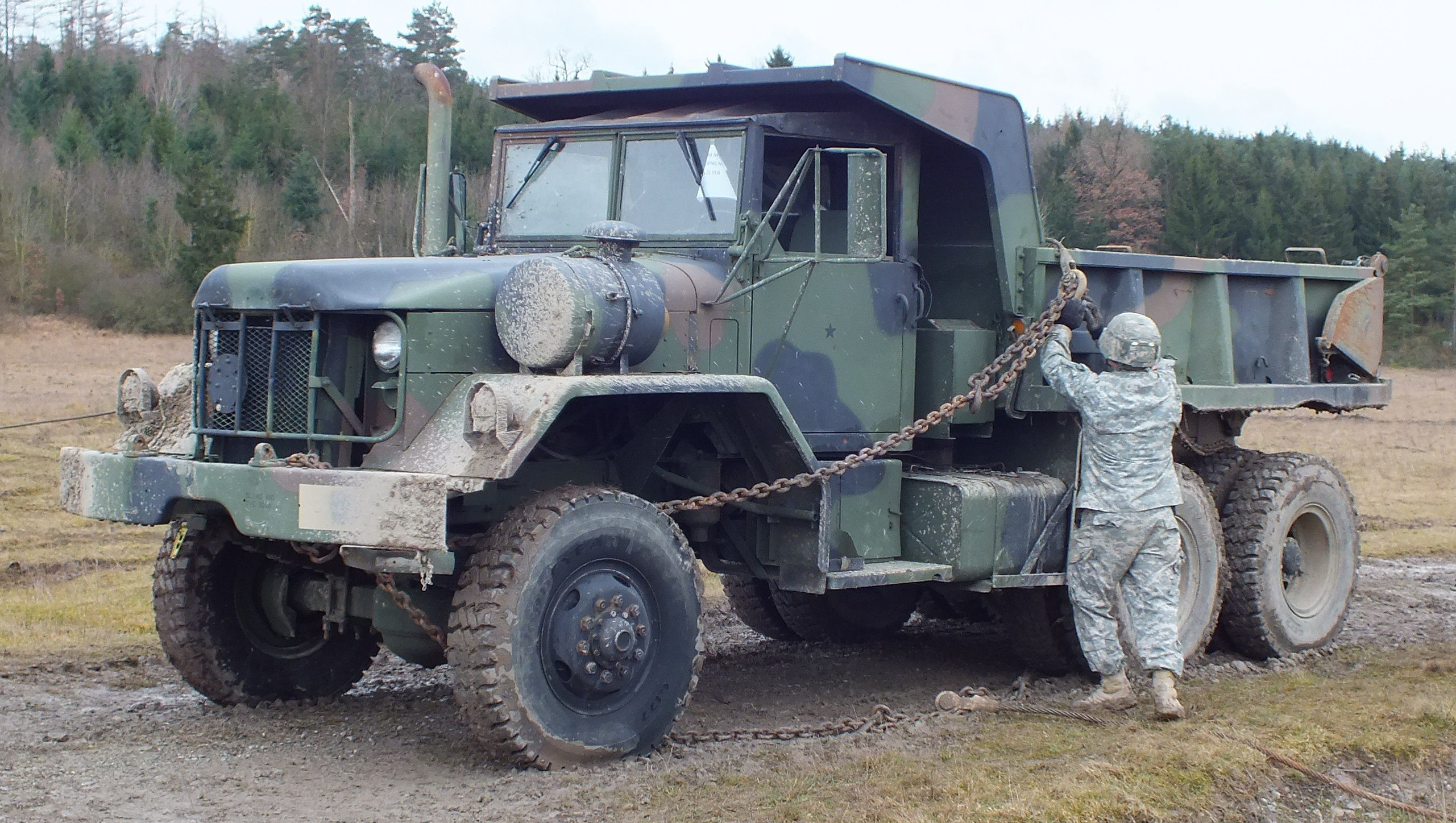
M817 5-ton 6x6

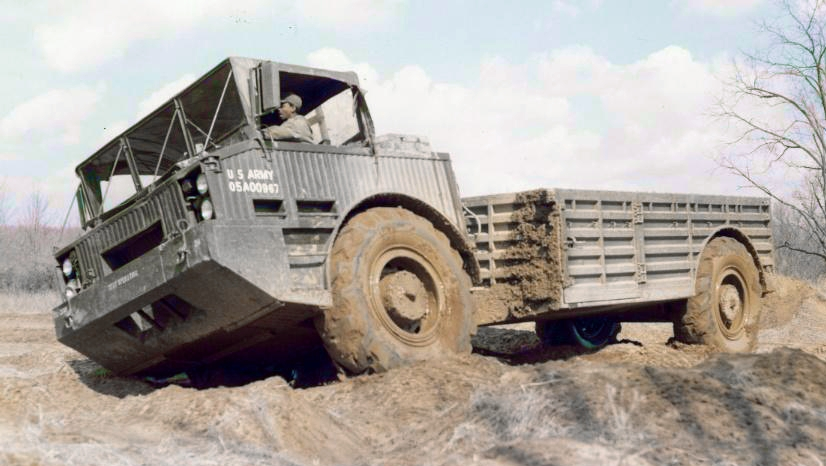
M520 8-ton 4x4

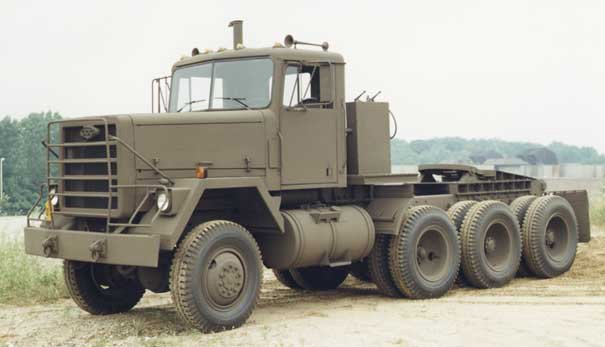
M920 20-ton 8x6

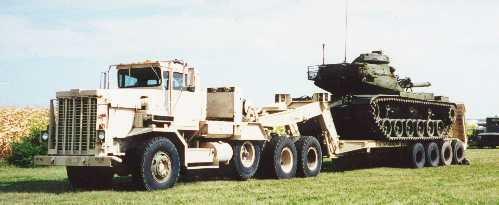
M911 heavy 8x6

Name and type	Build years	Total built	Notes
M880 series 1 1/4-ton 4x4	1975–1976	44,027	Ambulance, cargo, utility bodies (Modified Dodge W-series trucks)
M809 series 5-ton 6x6	1970–1982	38,800	Cargo, dump, tractor, van, wrecker, and others
M520; 8-ton 4x4	1972 (Note: Pre-production models tested in Germany and Vietnam from 1962)–1976	1300 (Note: Does not include pre-production vehicles.)	Cargo, tank and wrecker bodies Fully amphibious - "Goer"
M915 series 14-ton (Note: Up to 20-ton.) 6x4 (Note: Also 6x6 and 8x6)	1978–1982	9,505	Tractor, dump, tank, mixer AM General/CCC models
M911 C-MET (Note: Commercial Heavy Equipment Transporter); Heavy 8x6	1977		Semi-tractor for tank transporter (modified Oshkosh F2365 truck)

== 1980 ==
In the 1980s truck series began to be named from the initials of the truck type and are widely known by these names.

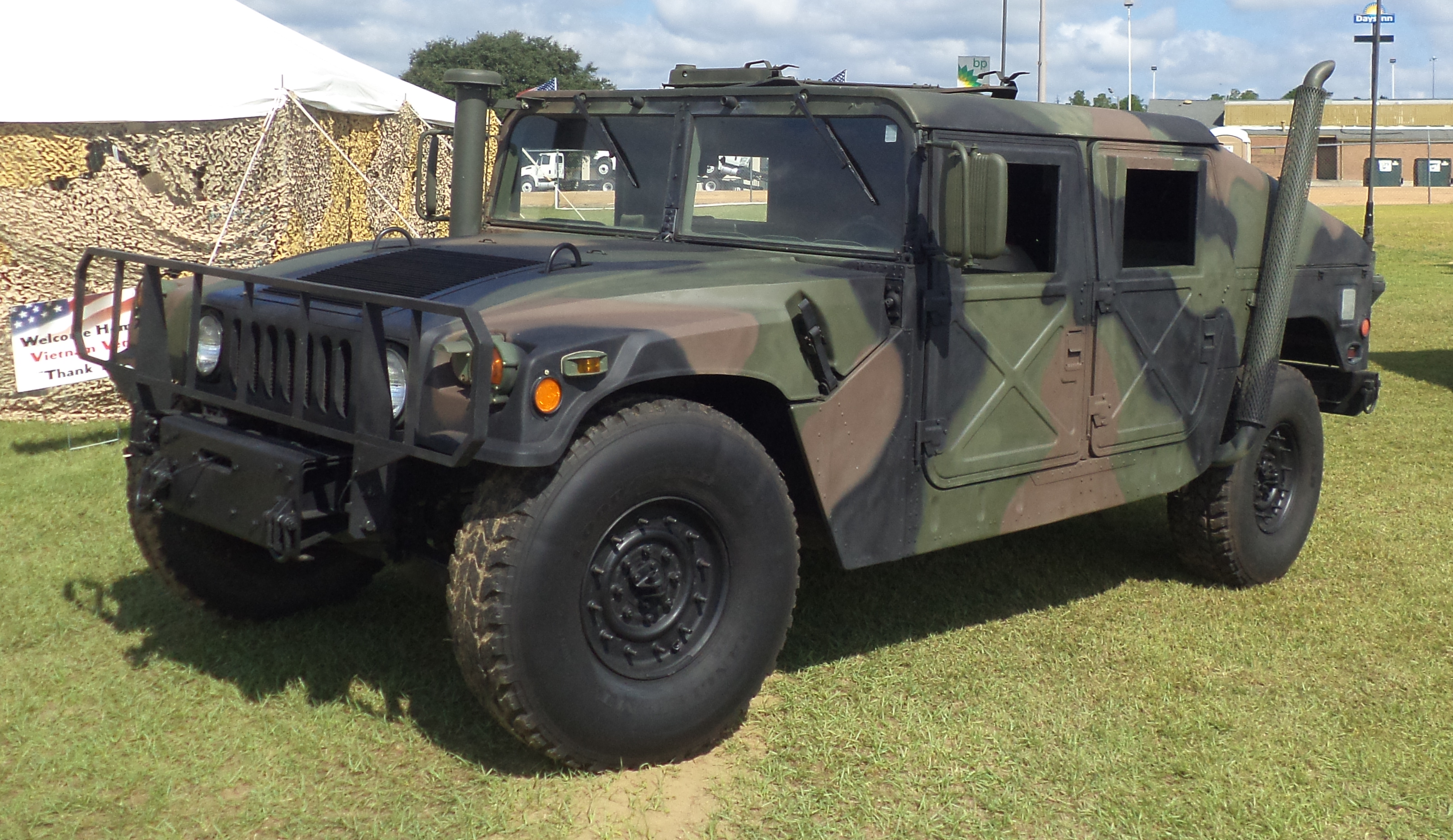
HMMWV 1 1/4-ton 4x4

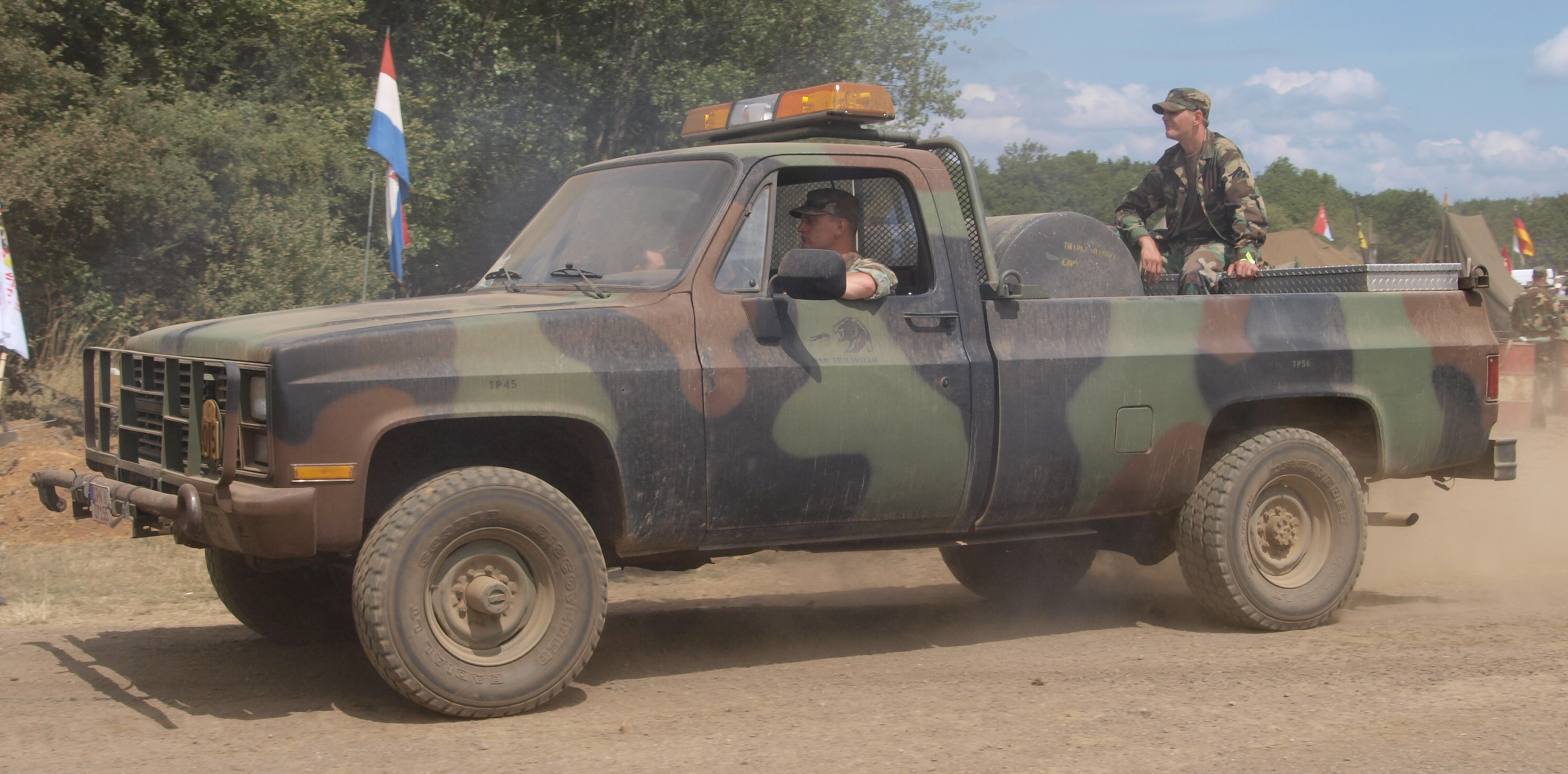
CUTV 1 1/4-ton 4x4

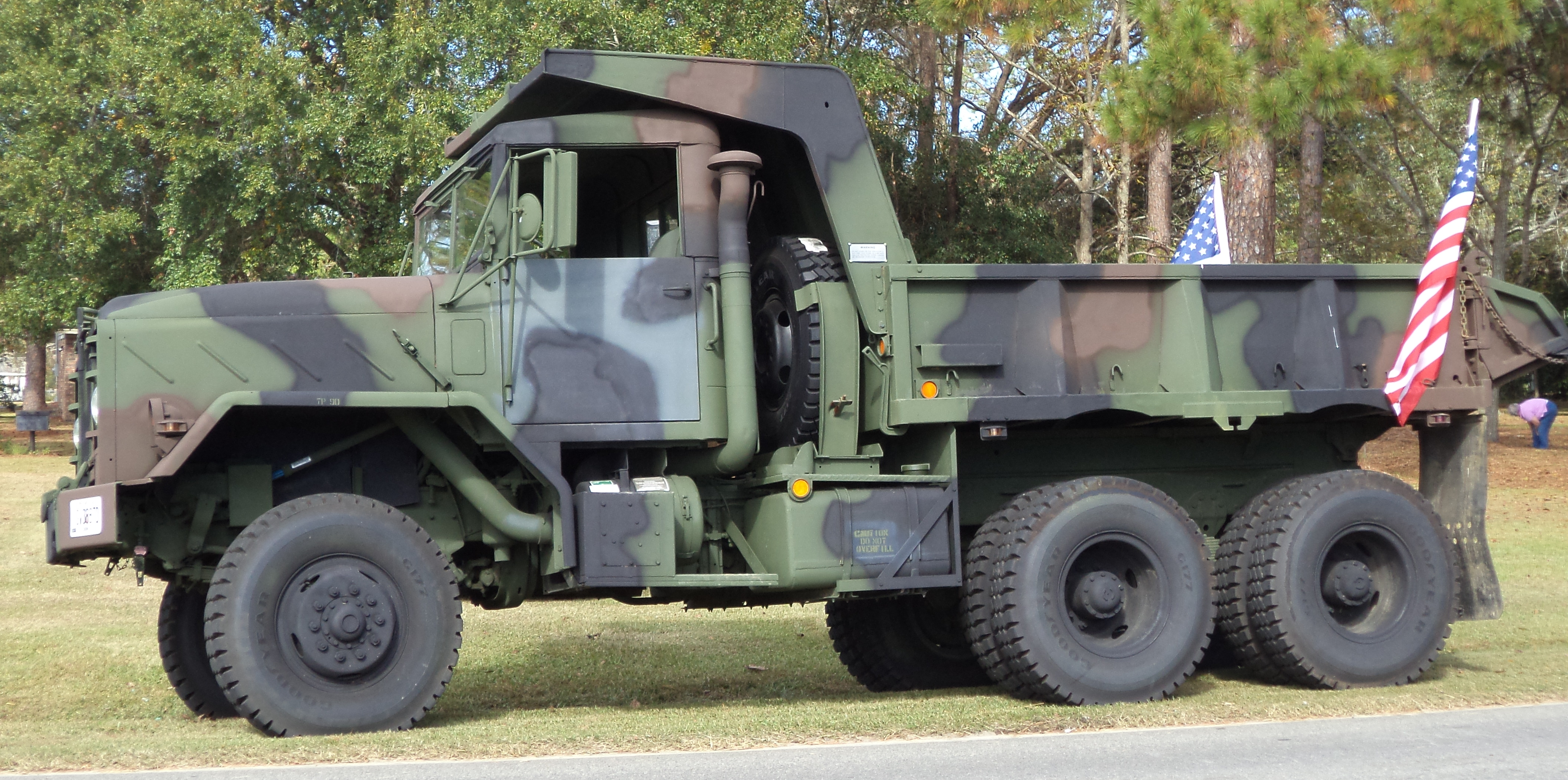
M929 5-ton 6x6

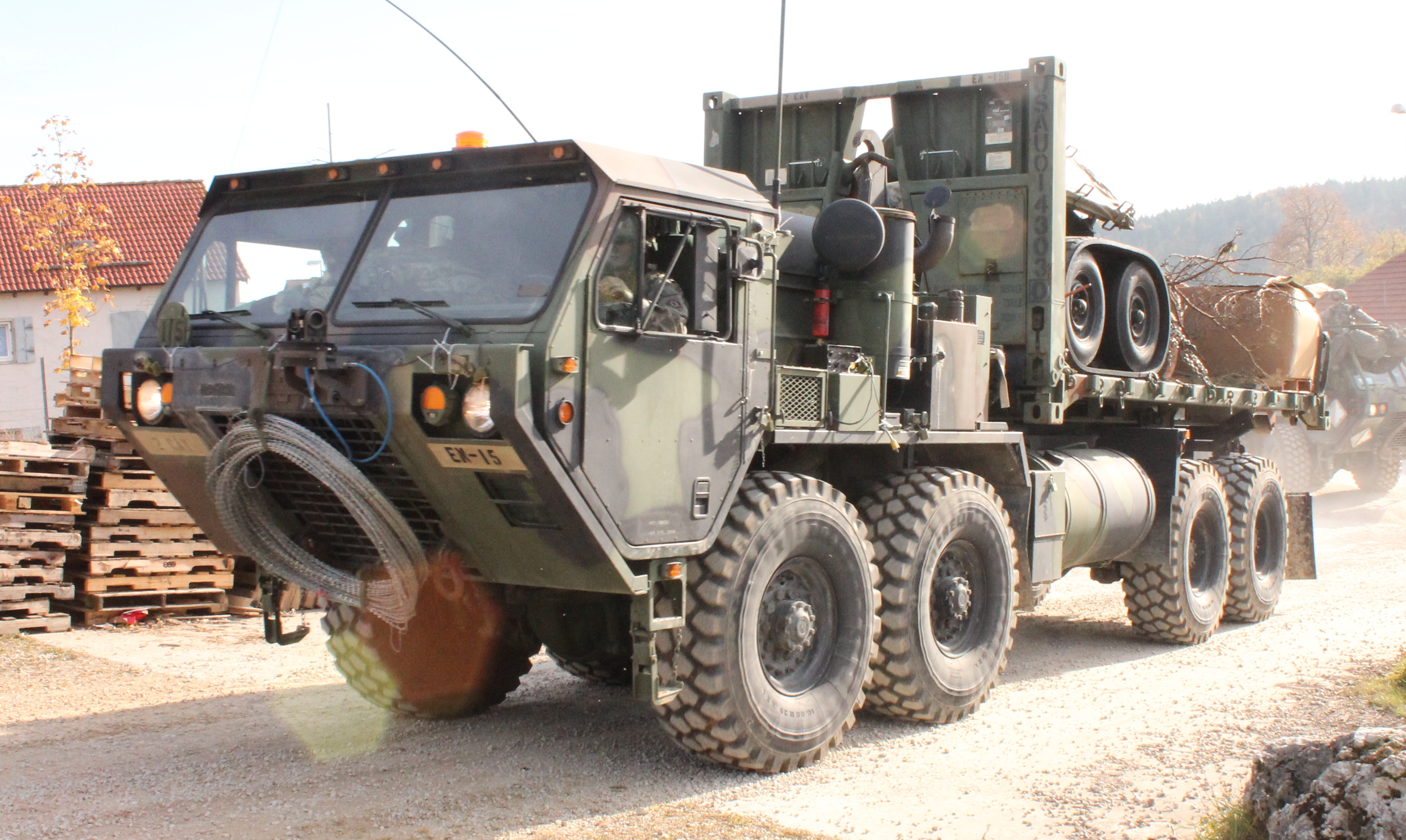
HEMTT 10-ton 8x8

Name and type	Build years	Total built	Notes
CUCV (Note: Commercial Utility Cargo Vehicle) M1008; 1 1/4-ton 4x4	1983–1986	70,889	Ambulance, cargo, utility bodies (Modified Chevrolet K-series trucks)
HMMWV (Note: High Mobility Multipurpose Wheeled Vehicle) M998; 1 1/2-ton 4x4	1983–present		Utility, ambulance, shelter-carrier
M939 Series; 5-ton 6x6	1982–1987	44,590 (Note: Includes AM General and Bowen-McLaughlin-York built.)	Cargo, dump, semi-tractor, van, wrecker, and others
HEMTT (Note: Heavy Expanded Mobility Tactical Truck) M977; 10-ton 8x8	1982–present	962	Cargo, semi-tractor, tanker, wrecker

== 1990 ==
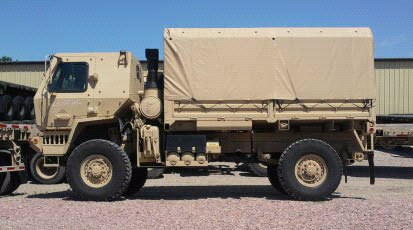
LMTV 2 1/2-ton 4x4

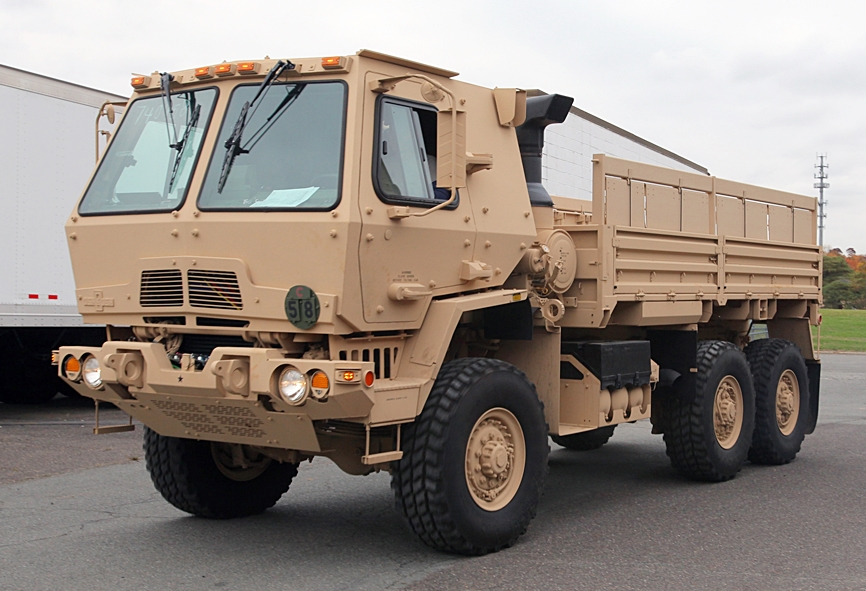
MTV 5-ton 6x6

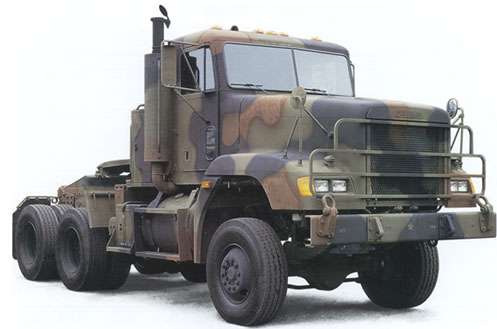
M916A2 20-ton 6x6

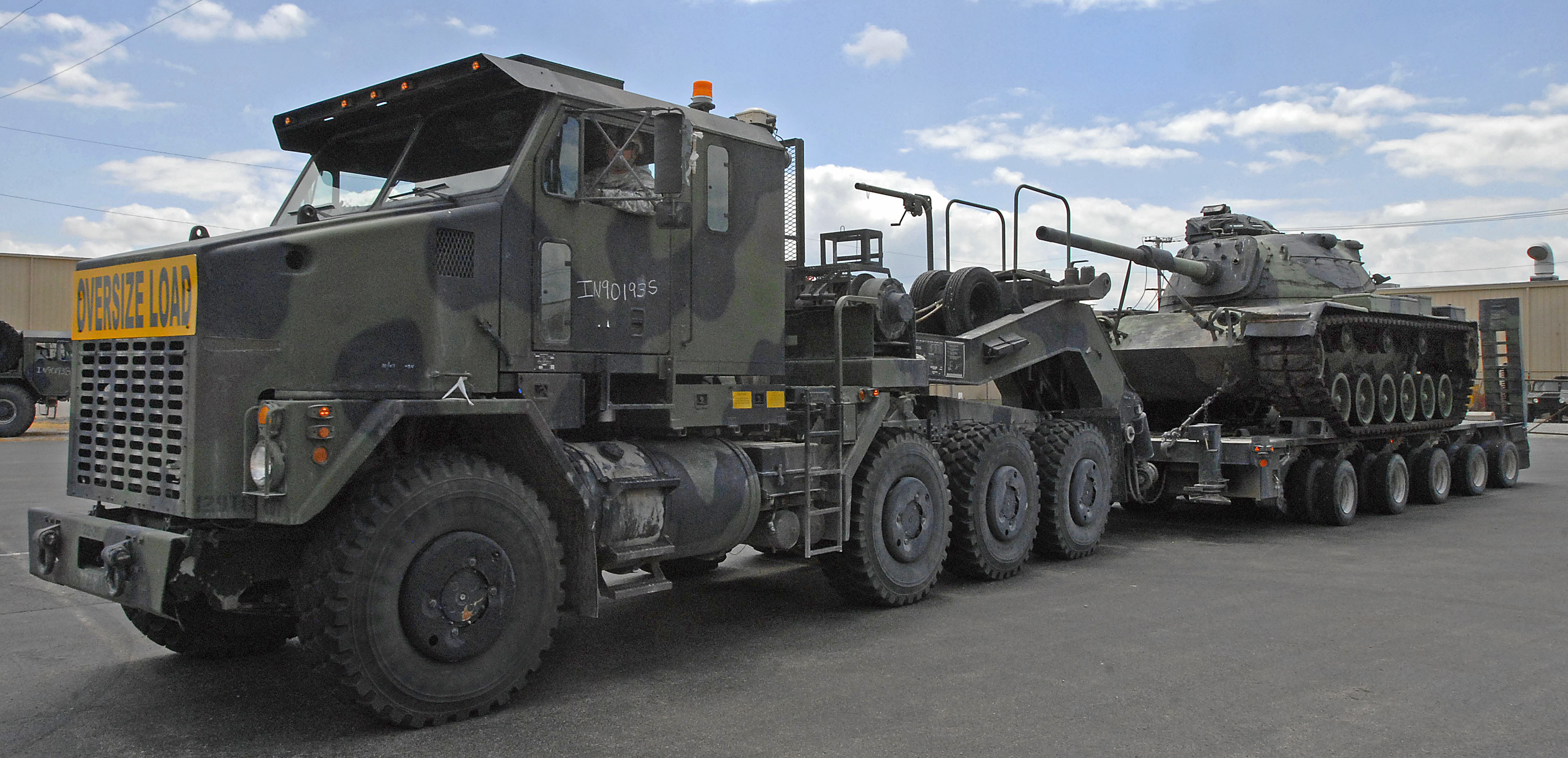
HET Heavy 8x8

Name and type	Build years	Total built	Notes
LMTV (Note: Light Medium Tactical Vehicle) M1078; 2 1/2-ton 4x4	1991–present		Cargo, van, and chassis for specialty bodies
MTV (Note: Medium Tactical Vehicle) M1083; 5-ton 6x6	2005–present		Cargo, dump, semi-tractor, tanker, wrecker, and others
M915A2 series 15-ton (Note: Also 18 1/2 and 20-ton) 6x4 (Note: Also 6x6)	1990–present		Tractor, dump Freightliner models
HET (Note: Heavy Equipment Transporter) M1070; Heavy 8x8	1993–present	2,033	Semi-tractor for tank transporter designed and built by Oshkosh

== 2000 ==
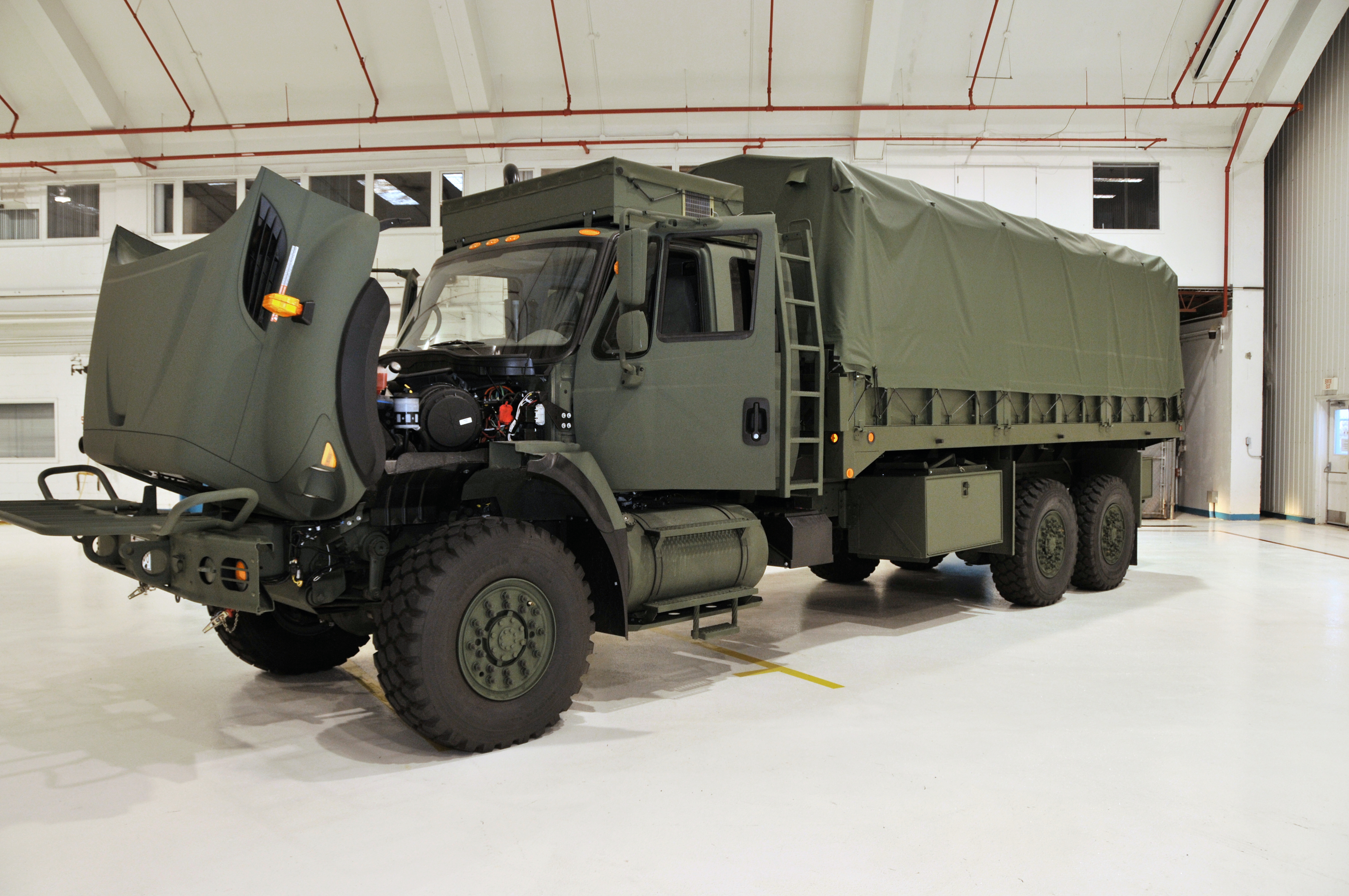
7000MV 6x6

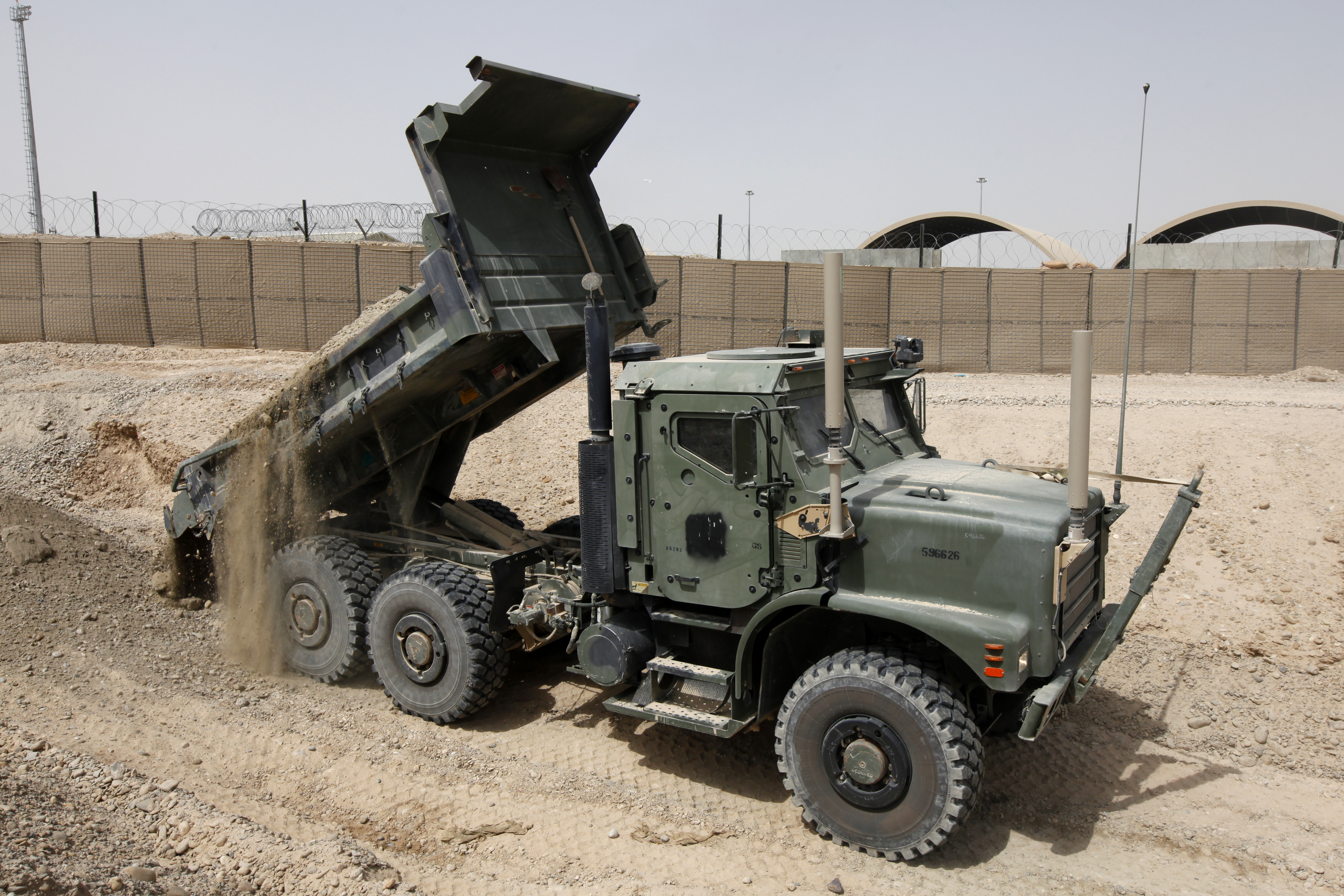
MTVR 7-ton 6x6

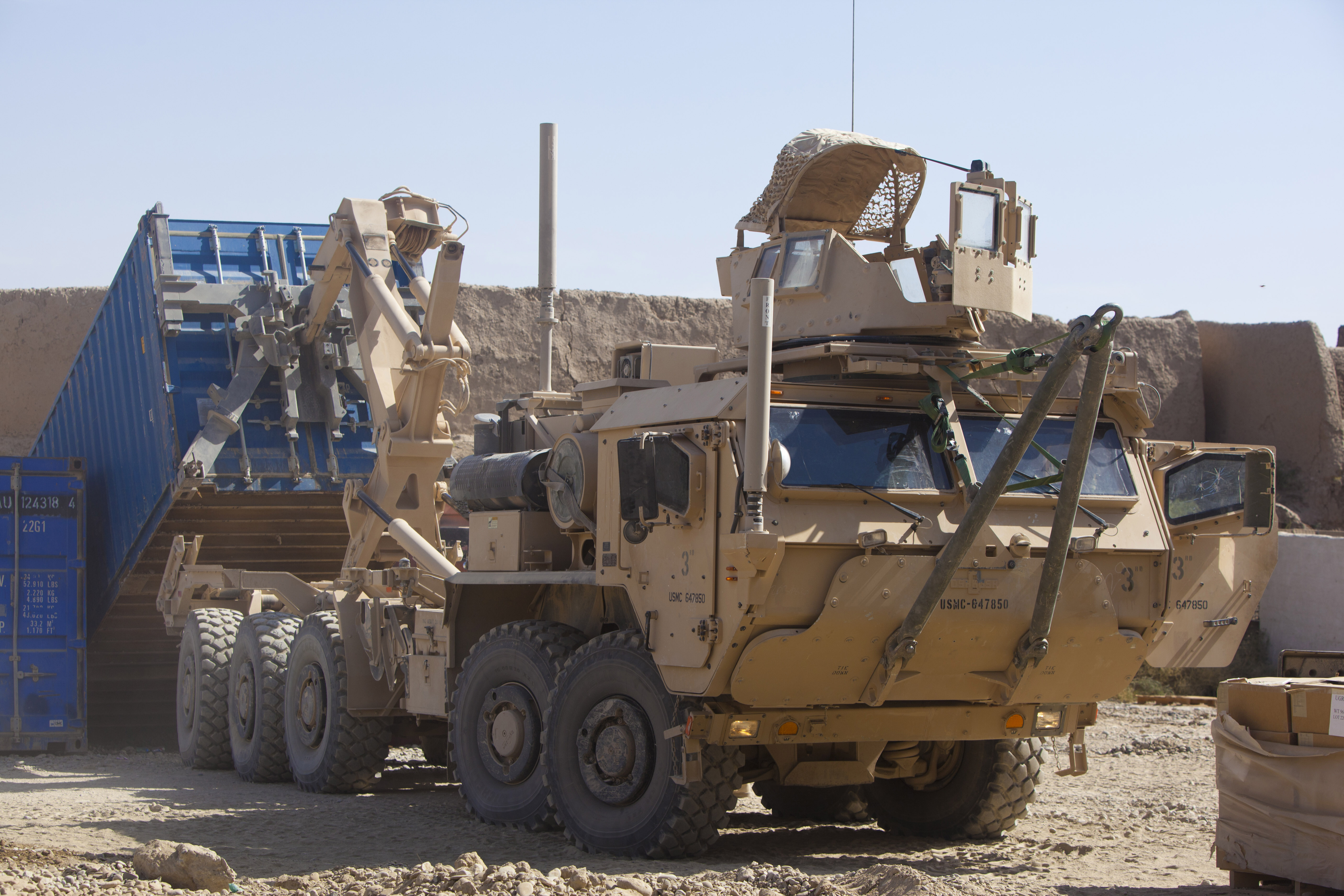
LVSR Heavy 10x10

Name and type	Build years	Total built	Notes
7000MV (Note: Navistar F7400 SFA 6x6); HD 6x6	2005–present	9,500+	For export (modified International WorkStar)
MTVR (Note: Medium Tactical Vehicle Replacement); 7-ton 6x6	1999		Cargo, dump, wrecker Used only by USMC
LVSR (Note: Logistic Vehicle System Replacement); Heavy 10x10	2009	1,500+	Cargo, tractor, wrecker Used only by USMC

== See also ==
- List of U.S. military vehicles by model number
- List of U.S. military vehicles by supply catalog designation
