= 2½-ton 6×6 truck =

Class of military medium duty trucks

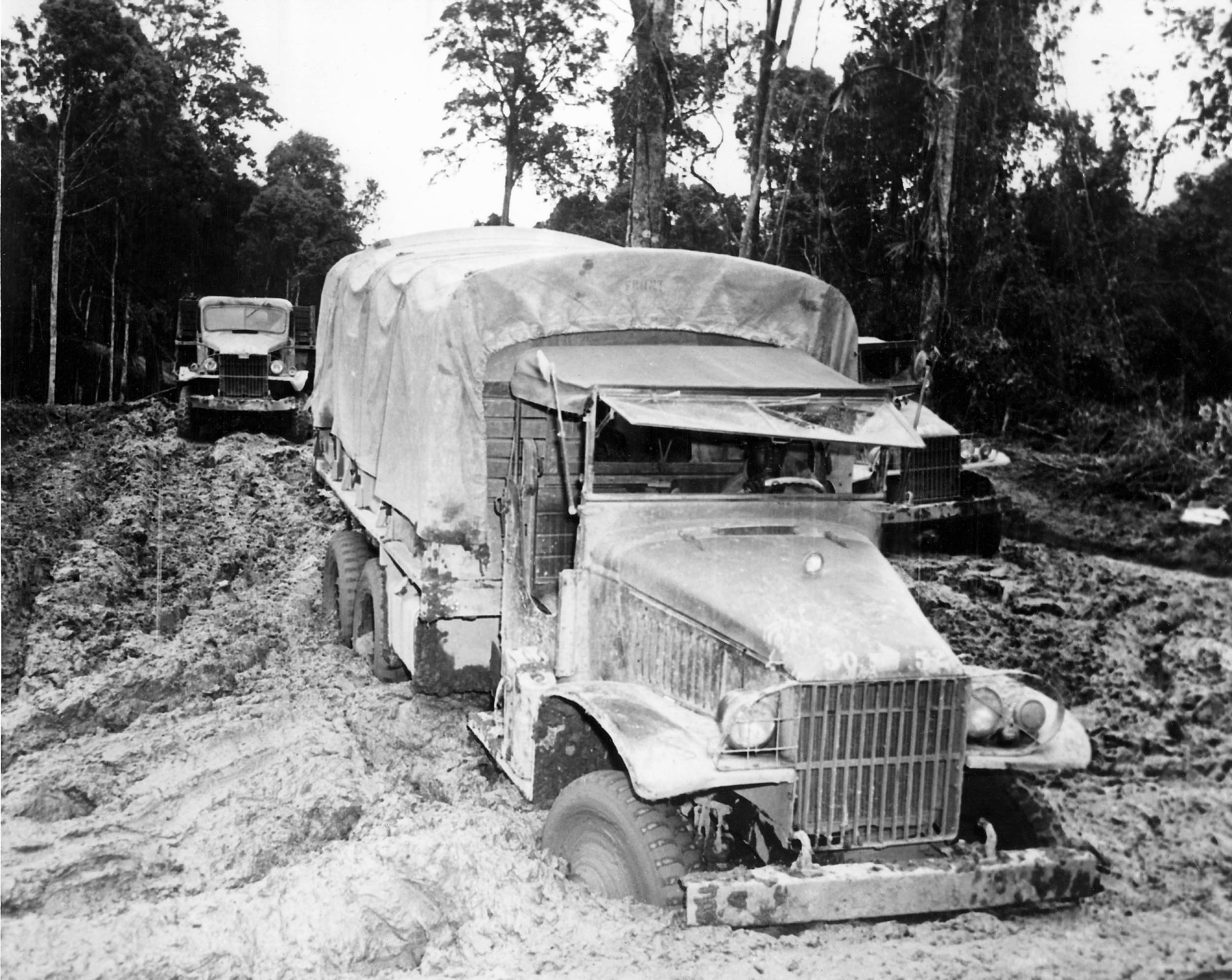
A Red Ball Express truck gets stuck in the mud during World War II, 1944.

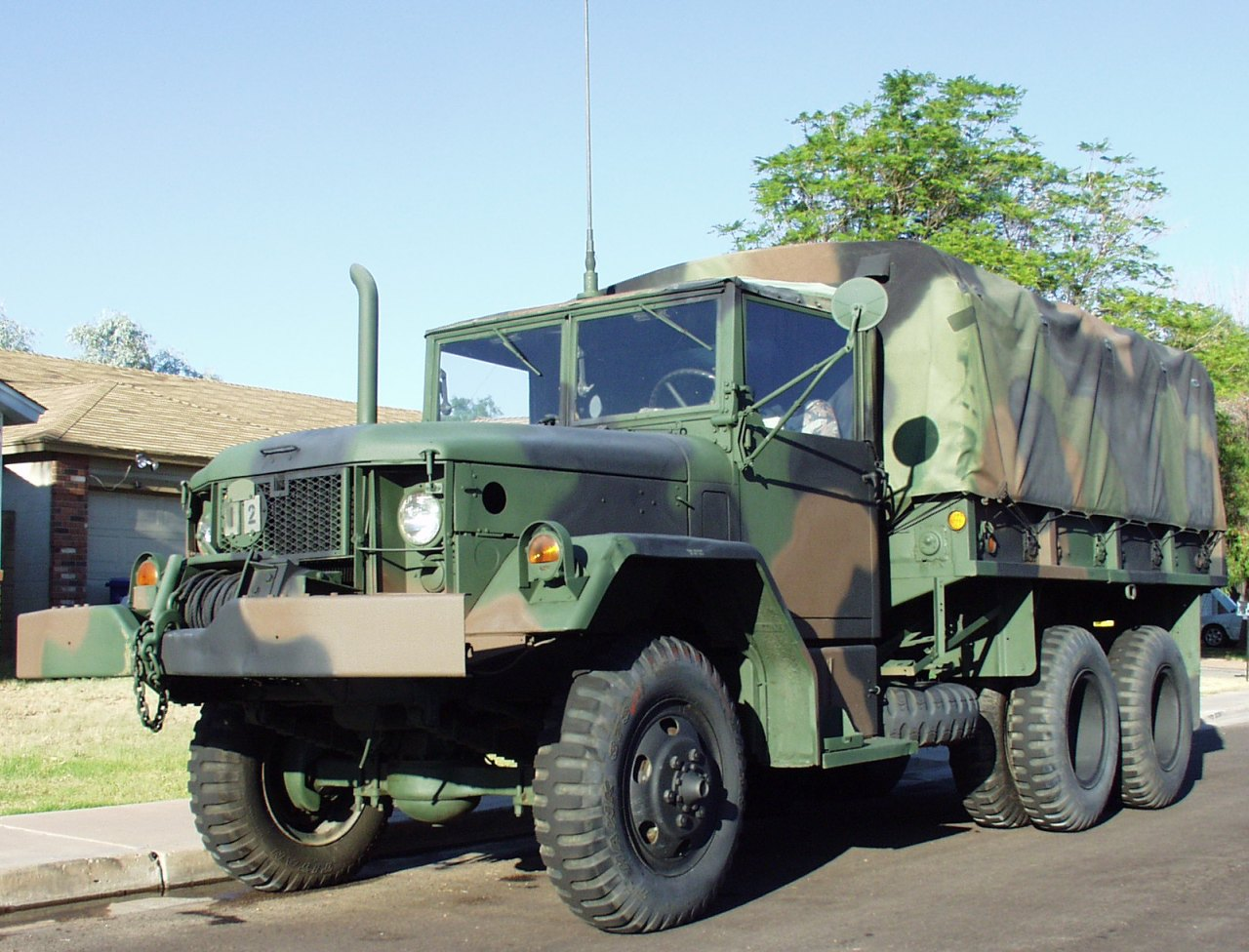
1971 AM General M35A2 with winch and camouflage cargo cover

The 2 1/2-ton, 6×6 truck was a standard class of medium-duty trucks, designed at the beginning of World War II for the U.S. Armed Forces, in service for over half a century, from 1940 into the 1990s. (Note: Originally, during World War II, categorized as a light-heavy truck.) Also frequently known as the deuce and a half, or just deuce, this nickname was popularized post WWII, most likely in the Vietnam War era. The basic cargo versions were designed to transport a cargo load of nominally 2 1/2 short tons (5,000 lb; 2,300 kg) over all terrain, in all weather. The 2 1/2-ton trucks were used ubiquitously in World War II, and continued to be the U.S. standard medium-duty truck class after the war, including wide usage in the Korean and Vietnam Wars, as well as the first Gulf War.

Originally, five different designs were standardized by the U.S.; two were also standardized by Canada. During World War II, the most important model for the U.S. Army was the GMC CCKW, or "Jimmy", with over 560,000 units built. Another 200,000+ deuces were Studebaker and REO US6, built primarily for Lend-Lease export, mostly to the Soviet Union, and many others have been exported to smaller militaries. In addition to the 6×6 trucks, a significant minority of these trucks were also built minus the front-wheel drive, as 6×4 trucks. (Note: The term "six by six" must not be taken too literally—the vast majority of the 2 1/2-ton trucks had ten wheels—what is meant is three axles, with driving power being available to all six axle-ends.) The nickname "Jimmy", a phonetical diminutive of GMC, could be applied to both their 6×6 and 6×4 units.

After World War II, the M series truck, originally developed by REO, became the standard 2 1/2-ton truck. First fielded in the late 1940s, it was originally known as the M34 and later became the M35 in 1954. The M35 became one of the most successful and long-lived series of trucks ever deployed by the U.S. military. They were used in Vietnam and continued to be used with various modifications into the late 1990s.

In 1991, the U.S. military began replacing the 2 1/2-ton, ten-wheeled (6×6 and 6×4) trucks, that were originally classified as "light-heavy" in WWII, and "medium duty" later in their service life, with a significantly different design: the four-wheeled (4×4), cab over engine "light medium", but equally 2 1/2-ton rated, LMTV variants of the Family of Medium Tactical Vehicles (FMTV) .

Of the almost 2.4 million trucks that the U.S. Army bought between 1939 and December 1945 (across all payload weight classes), just over one third (~812,000) were 2 1/2-ton trucks, the vast majority of which (over 675,000 units) were six-by-six variants—outnumbering the almost 650,000 World War II jeeps. A further ~118,000 2 1/2-ton trucks were built as 6×4 driven units.

The 2 1/2-ton cargo truck was considered such a valuable piece of equipment that General Eisenhower wrote that most senior officers regarded it as "one of the six most vital" U.S. vehicles to win the war. (Note: The others being the bulldozer, the Landing Ship, Tank, the amphibious "Duck" truck, the jeep, and the C-47 airplane.) It has been called the most important truck of World War II, and the 6×6 became known as the "workhorse of the army". According to Hyde (2013): "Each of the three axles had its own differential, so power could be applied to all six wheels on rough terrain and steep hills. The front axle was typically disengaged on smooth highways, where these 'workhorses' often carried loads much above their rated capacity."

Half a century after World War II, the remanufactured 2 1/2-ton M35 trucks still met 95 percent of the performance requirements at 60 percent of the cost of a new FMTV vehicle.

== History ==
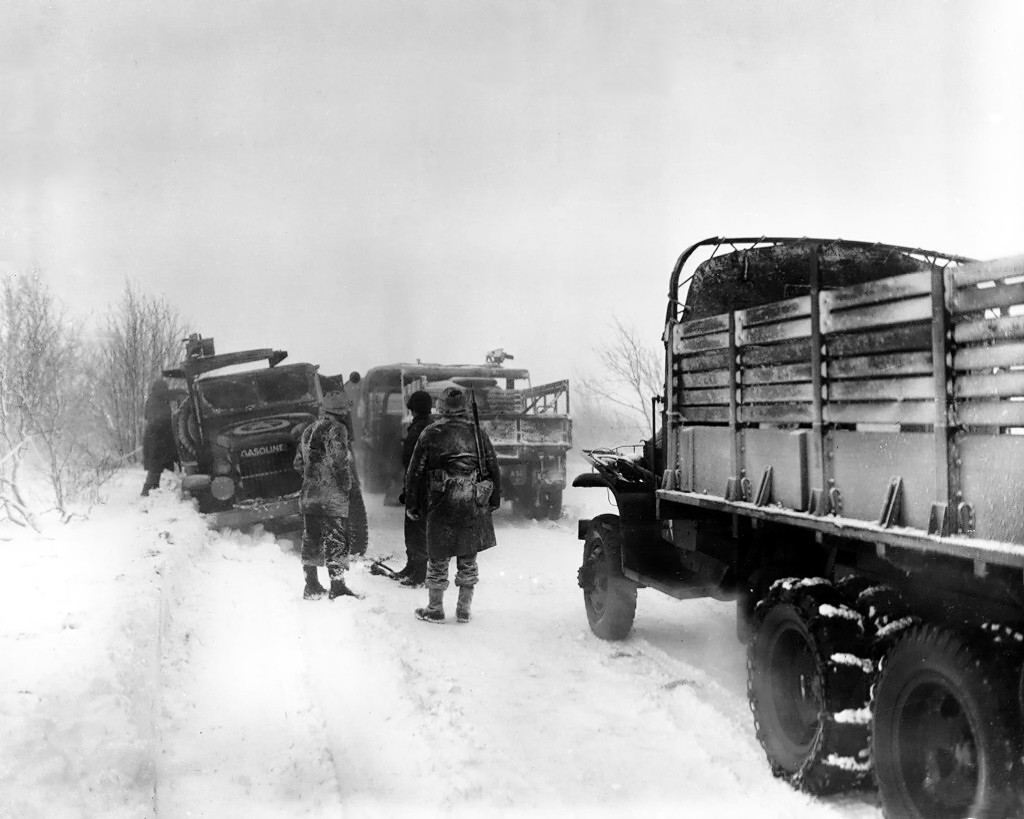
U.S. Army vehicles on a road in Belgium, 19 January 1945

In 1939–1940, the U.S. Army Ordnance Corps was developing a 2 1/2-ton (5,000 lbs, 2,300 kg) load-rated 6×6 tactical cargo truck that could operate off-road in all weather. Dump, semi-tractor, tanker, and other bodies were also planned.

Yellow Coach (a GM company), Studebaker, International Harvester, and REO Motor Car Company submitted designs, all except REO's were accepted and in production by 1941. Yellow's CCKW became the Army standard, International's M-5-6 became Navy and Marine Corps standard, and Studebaker's US6 was built for export to allied countries. REO built the Studebaker design.

In the late 1940s, the military needed a new standard truck. Chrysler, GMC, REO, and Studebaker submitted designs. The REO design was standardized for all services as the M35, and continued standard until 1990. The GMC was classed as substitute standard M135 in the U.S. but became standard in Canada.

== Designs ==
=== GMC CCKW ===
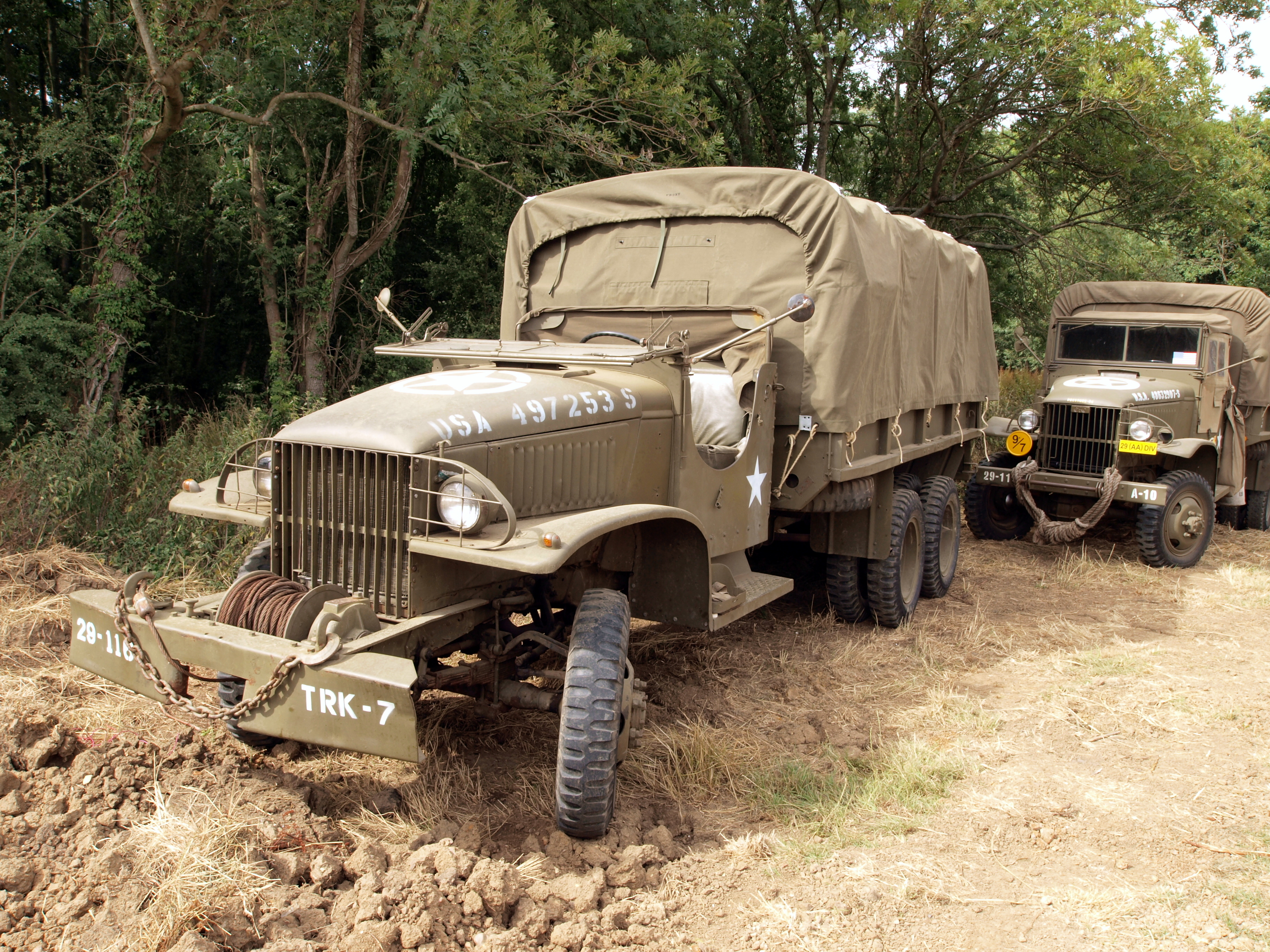
GMC CCKW

As the standard U.S. Army design during World War II, over 560,000 were built, more than any other U.S. vehicle except the "Jeep". By 1947, there were over 20 standardized bodies, and many more special modifications.

Production began at Yellow Coach's Pontiac, Michigan, truck plant in 1941 and at Chevrolet's St. Louis plant in 1942. In 1943, Yellow was renamed GMC, leading to the popular nickname "Jimmy". Production ended in 1945.

Early trucks had GM's standard closed cab; from July 1943, military open cabs were used, which were easier to build and lowered shipping height. To conserve steel, later cargo bodies were built largely of wood. The cab over engine AFKWX, 6×4 CCW, and amphibious DUKW were mechanically virtually identical and were built next to CCKWs in both plants.

=== Studebaker US6 ===
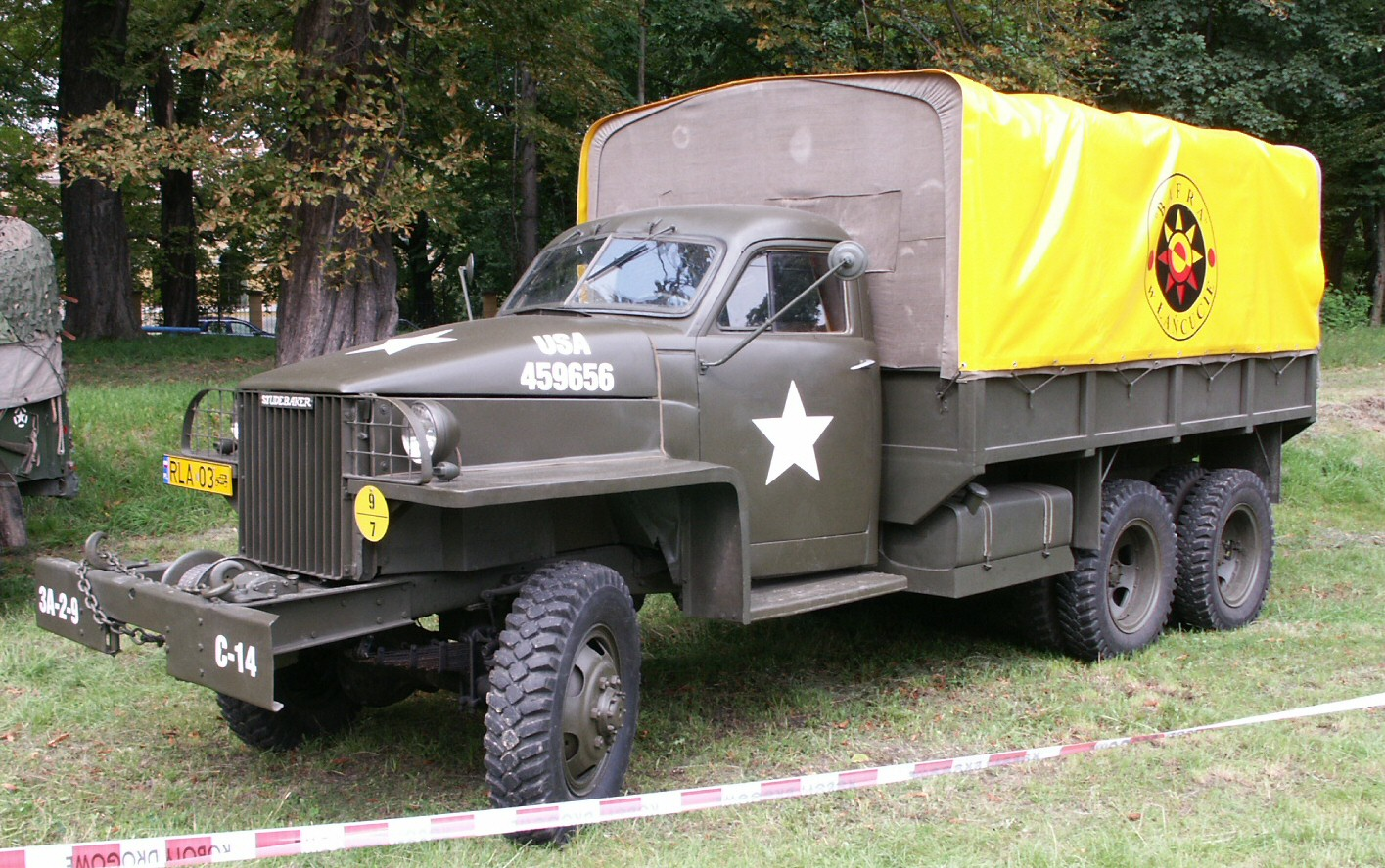
Studebaker US6

The US6 was very similar in layout to, and shared some components with, the CCKW. Studebaker built over 195,000 at their South Bend, Indiana, plant between June 1941 and August 1945; REO built another 22,000 in 1944–1945. The majority were exported via Lend-Lease to the Soviet Union.

Early trucks used a commercial-style closed cab; in December 1942, an open military-style cab entered production. The Soviet Union preferred the closed cabs for their extreme weather, so in March 1943, the open cabs were discontinued, after only about 10,000 were built.

The Studebakers were very successful in the Soviet Union, where they carried large loads on poor roads in extreme weather. After the war, the basic design of the Studebaker US6 was closely copied in the Soviet Union to develop the GAZ-51 and GAZ-63 trucks, which were produced between 1946 and 1975.

=== IHC M-5-6 ===
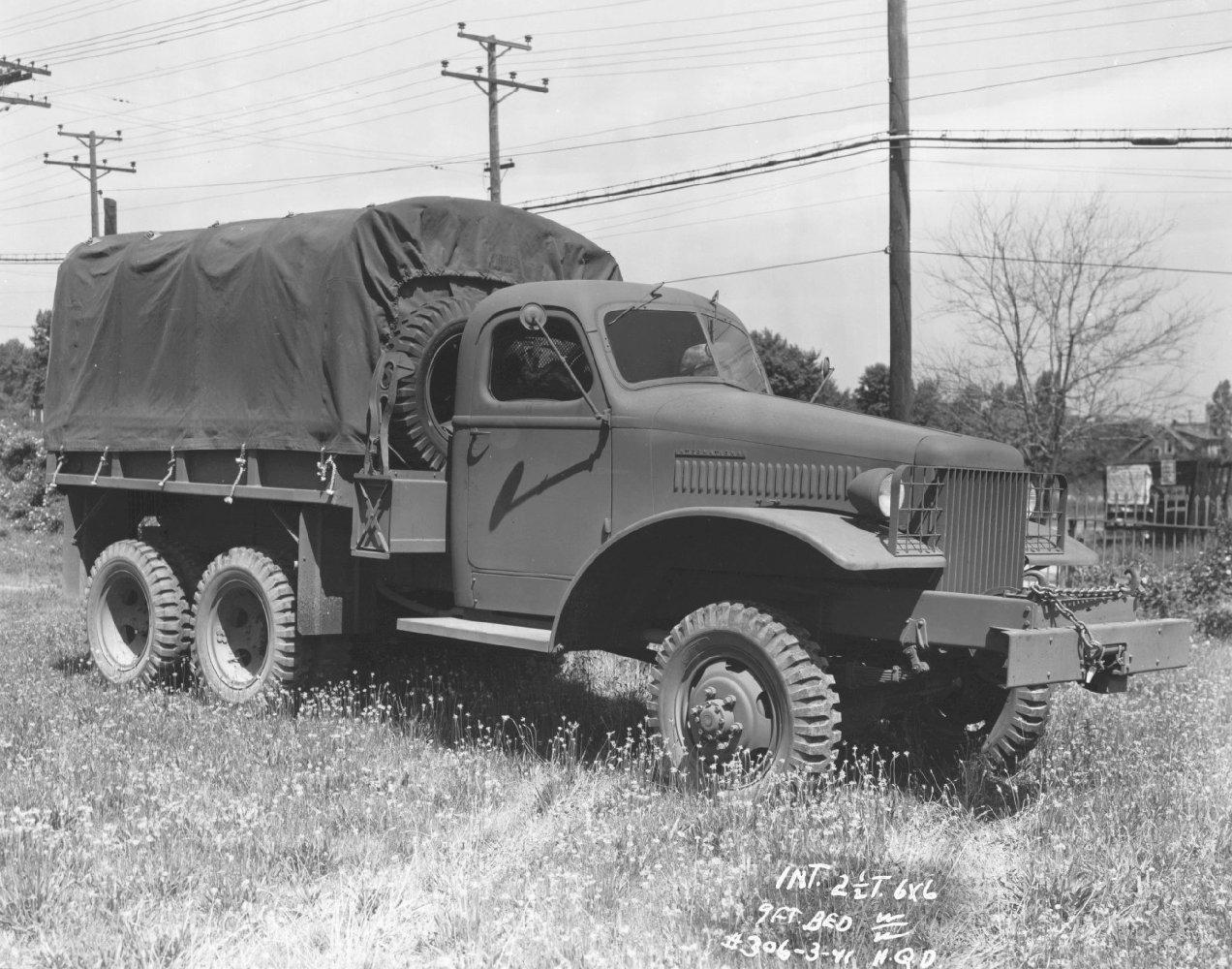
International M-5H-6

The International design began production at Ft. Wayne, Indiana, in 1941. Five hundred M-5-6s and 3,000 M-5-6×4s, with a commercial International K truck model cab, were complete by 1942, and were exported to the Soviet Union. The design then was upgraded, with a larger engine, tires, military open cab, and other improvements, and standardized as the M-5H-6 for the U.S. Navy and Marines. As the only 2 1/2-ton with locking differentials, it had excellent off-road performance. More than 30,000 of all models were built between 1941 and 1945.

=== REO M35 ===
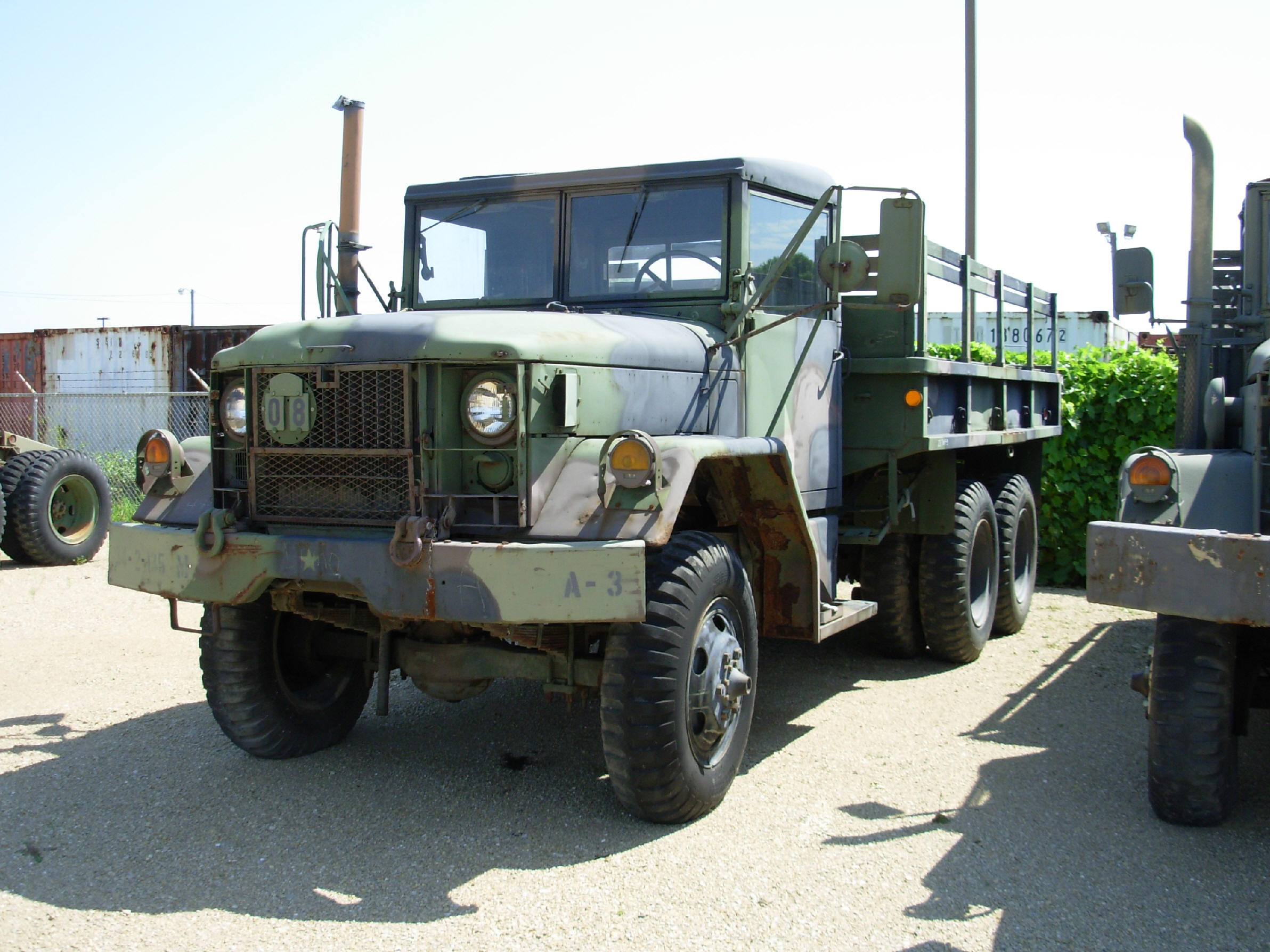
REO M35

The standard post-war 2 1/2-ton truck M35 was manufactured by REO, Kaiser-Jeep, Curtis-Wright, Studebaker, Studebaker-Packard, AM General, and Bombardier (Canada) from 1950 until the late 1980s, with remanufacture extending into FY1999. The M35 has had the widest range of bodies of any U.S. truck. The cab design itself became the military standard, also used by 5- and 10-ton trucks. First built with a gasoline engine, the multifuel engine became standard in 1964. In 1991, existing M35s began to be upgraded with diesel engines and automatic transmissions. Canadian trucks had automatic transmissions as built.

=== GMC M135 ===
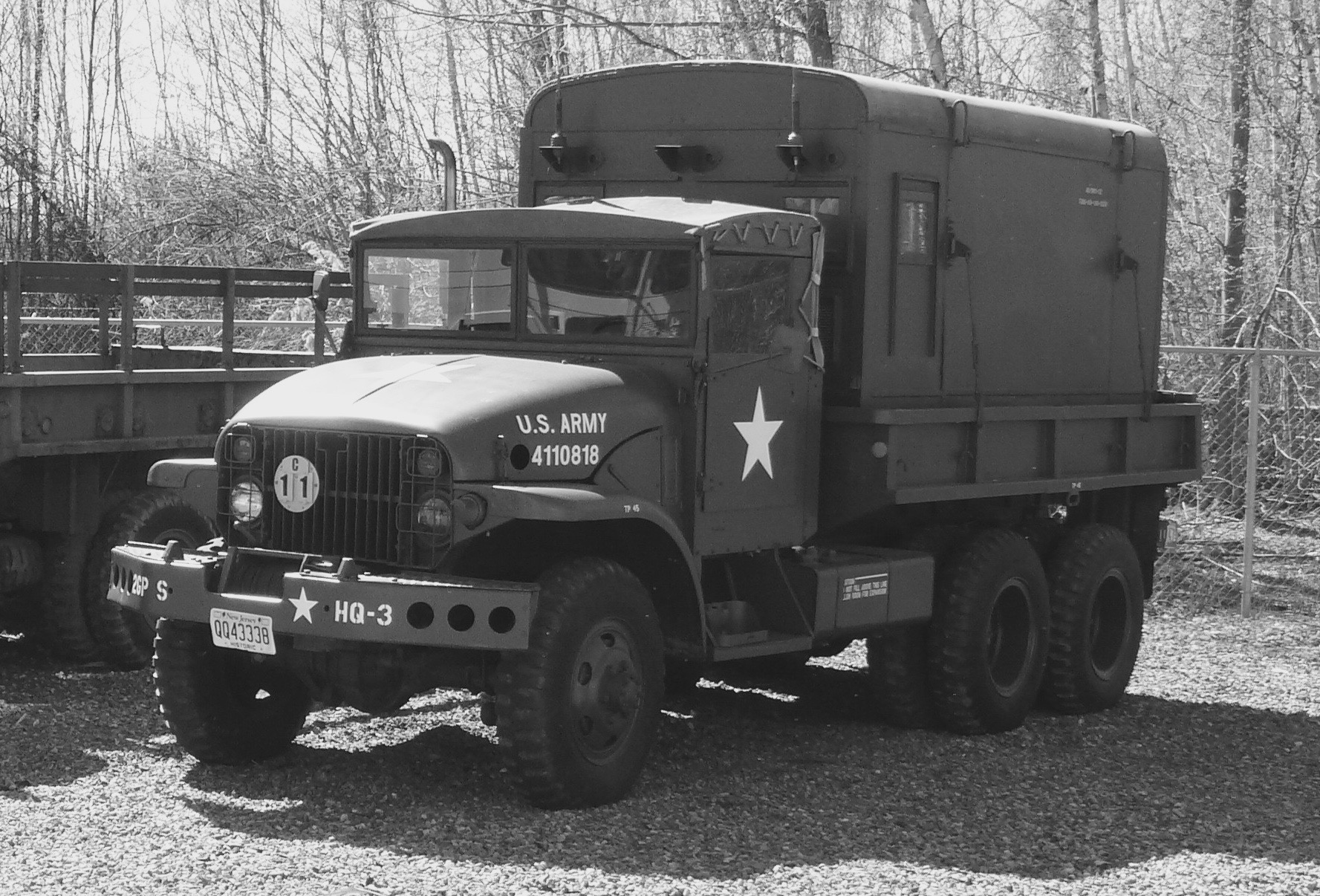
GMC M211

An evolution from their widely successful CCKW, General Motors' successor "Deuce and a Half" 2 1/2-ton M135 was classed as a substitute standard in the U.S. Army after the REO M35 was standardized, and thus was employed in much smaller numbers; however, the M135 was also widely used by the Canadian Army.

The six-wheel M135 cargo / personnel truck featured a 180-inch wheelbase with a single-wheel rear tandem and 11:00×20 size tires, necessitating a wheel well in the cargo bed for clearance. The M211 was identical except that it had a dual-wheel tandem and smaller 9:00×20 tires. Other dual tandem versions produced were the M217 fuel tanker, M220 shop van, and M222 water tanker, plus the shorter M215 dump truck and M221 tractor with a 168-inch wheelbase. The M135 was the only 2 1/2-ton truck of the era designed with an automatic transmission. The transmission had 4 speeds and 2 ranges, with a single-range transfer case.

== Bodies ==
=== Cab ===
All of the 1940 designs had commercial-type closed cabs with minor modifications. Variants had an open passenger roof so a ring for a .50-caliber machine gun could be mounted; during World War II, approximately one in four trucks had a ring. In 1942, to simplify production and reduce shipping height, all manufacturers began to use military-style open cabs. Studebaker returned to closed cabs after only 10,000 open cabs were built because the major user USSR preferred closed cabs. The post-war M35 and M135 were designed with open cabs and half-doors. Most military cabs could mount a machine gun ring. The M35 and M135 had removable hardtops available.

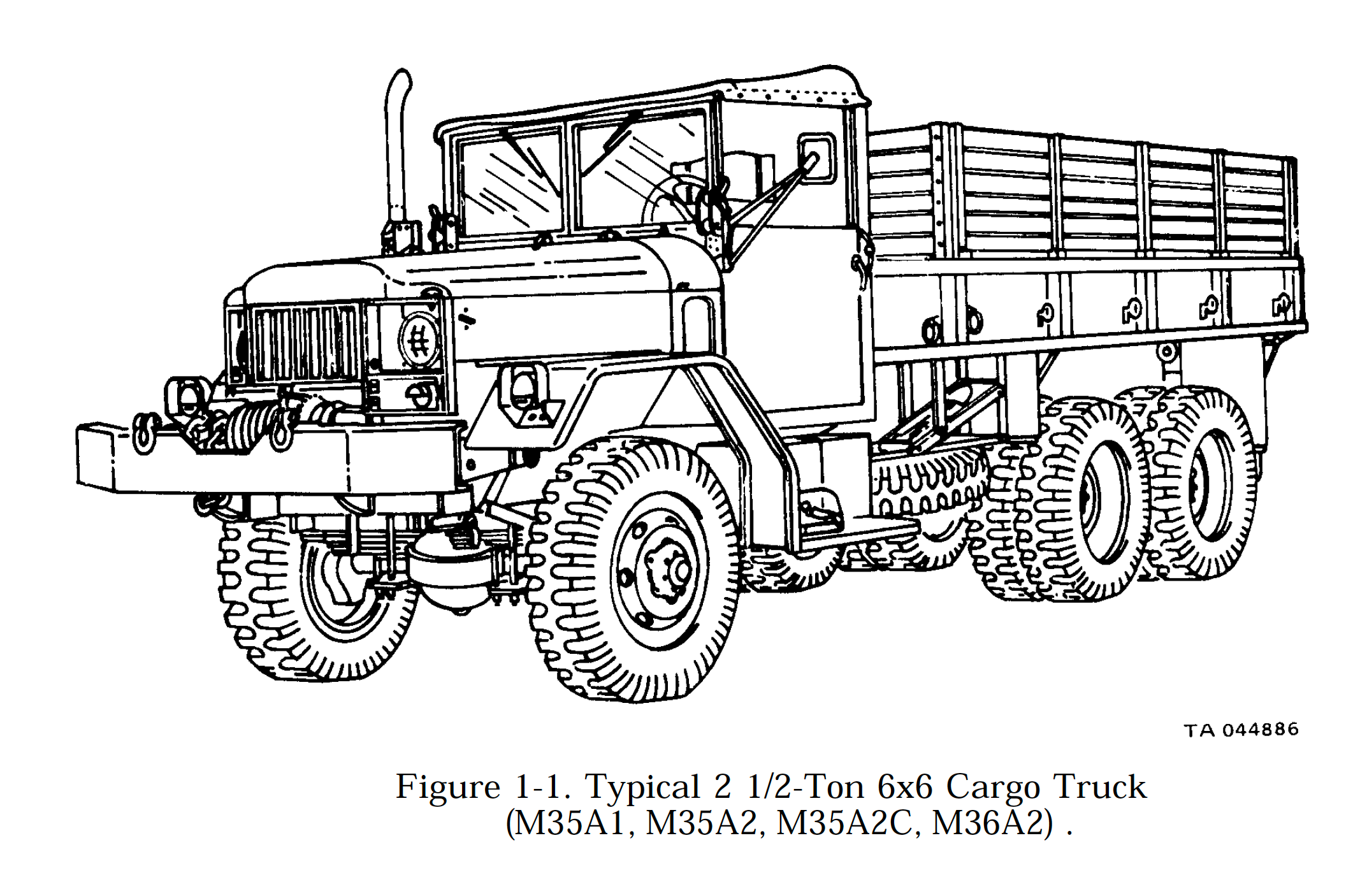
M35 Cargo Truck

=== Cargo trucks ===
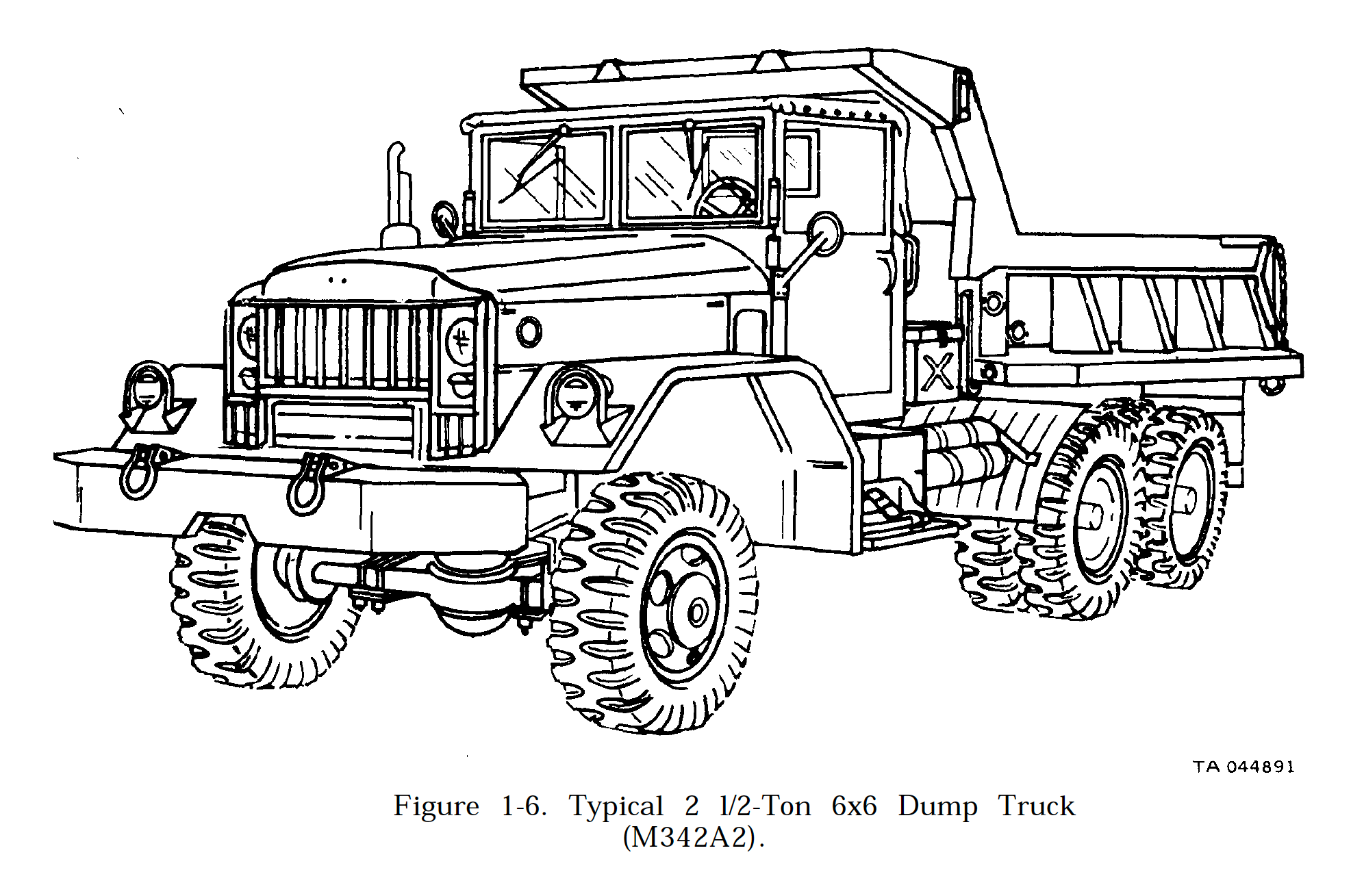
M342 Dump Truck

All series had a cargo model with a 12 ft (3.66 m) body on a long wheelbase. The 1940 designs had a 9 ft (2.74 m) prime mover-type body on a short wheelbase, the M35 series had a 17 ft 5 in (5.31 m) body on a longer wheelbase (178 in).

All models had removable sideboards and overhead bows for a tarpaulin over the cargo area. All except the extra-long wheelbase M36 (214 in) had folding troop seats in the sideboards.

Late in World War II, to conserve steel, cargo bodies were made largely of wood; postwar, the M35 and M135 series returned to steel.

=== Dump trucks ===
All series had dump trucks on both short wheelbase (166 in) and long (178 in). The US6 also had side-dump trucks. The cab stone-shield could be removed on most to lower shipping height. They could be equipped with overhead bows, tarpaulin, and troop seats.

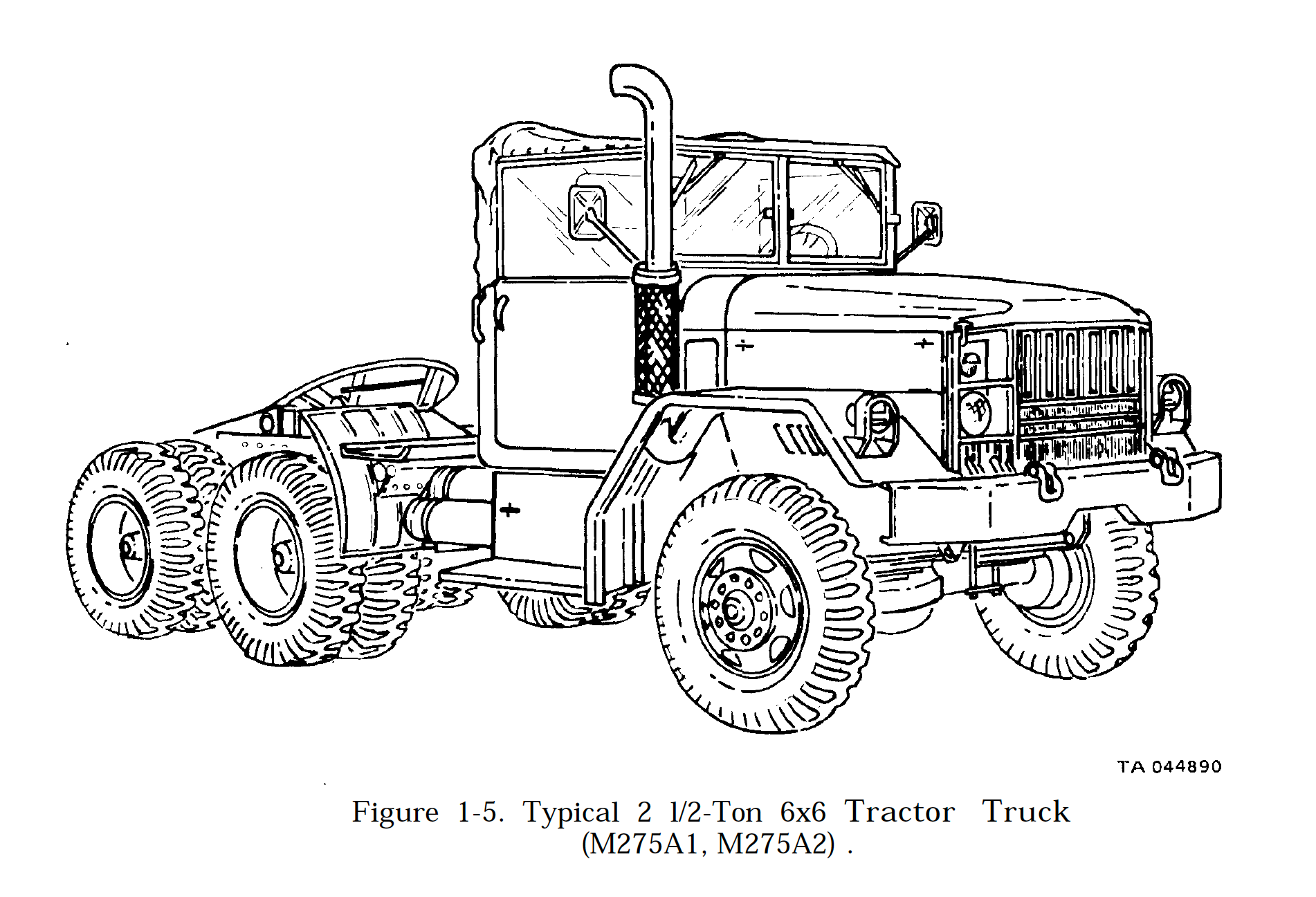
M275 Tractor Truck

=== Semi-tractor trucks ===
The M-6H-6, M211, and M35 series had a semi-tractor on a short wheelbase (166 in), the M35 series also had a long tractor (178 in). GMC made a few tractors based on the CCKW 352 during World War II. Studebaker never built a 6×6 tractor but built a 6×4 model.

Semi-tractor/trailers have limited off-road performance and are not rated for full off-road use. The M35 and M211 series fifth wheel load rating was 12,000 lb (5,400 kg) on road and 7,000 lb (3,200 kg) off-road. A 36,000 lb (16,000 kg) trailer could be towed on road and a 17,000 lb (7,700 kg) trailer off-road.

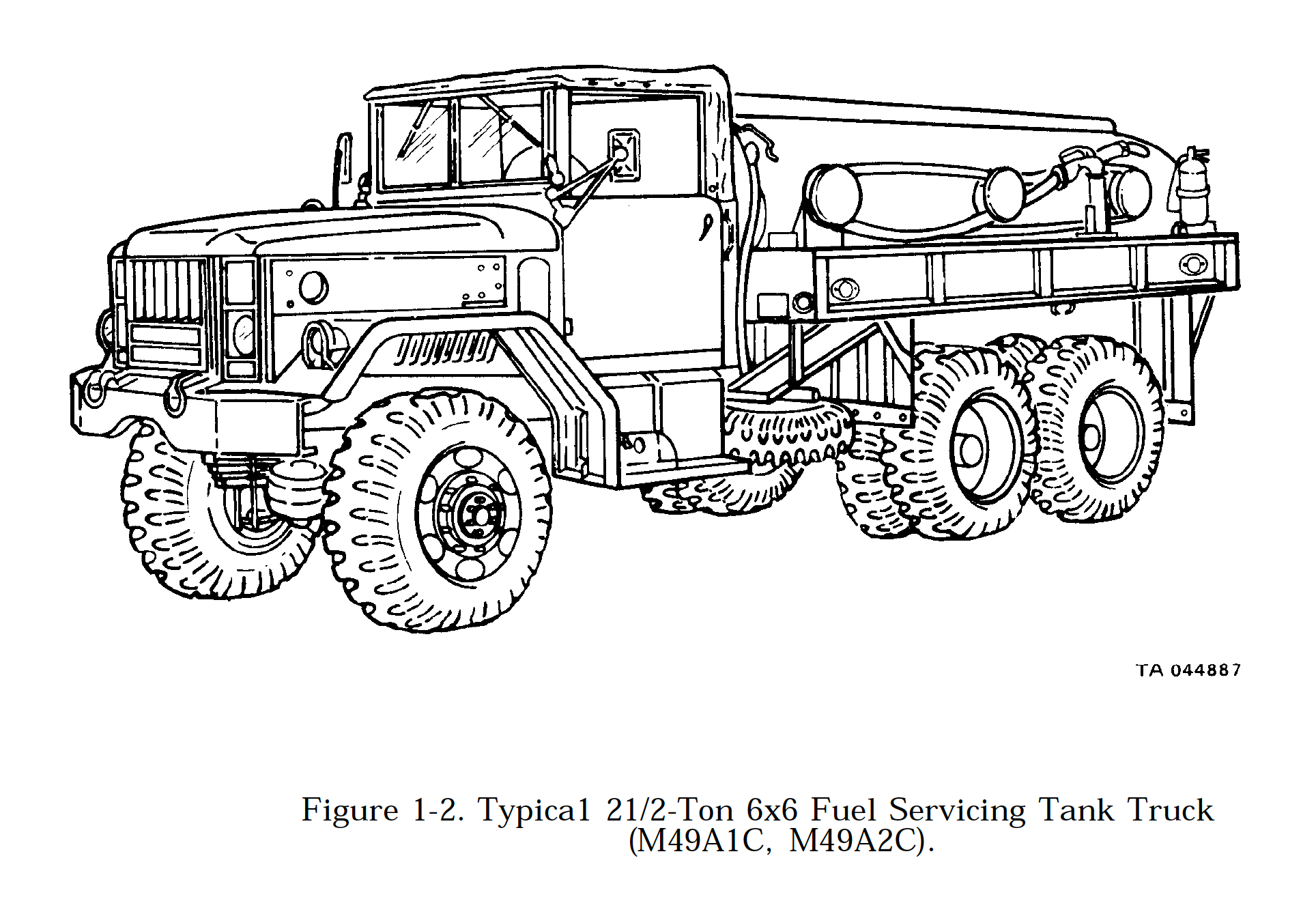
M49 Tank Truck

=== Tank trucks ===
All series had fuel and/or water tank versions on long wheelbases. Capacities were 750 US gal (2,800 L) to 1,200 US gal (4,500 L) in 2 or 3 compartments, depending on the series and whether carrying gasoline, water, or other liquid. Most had pumps and some had heaters. Most World War II units could be fitted with bows and a tarpaulin to camouflage themselves as common cargo trucks.

=== Van trucks ===
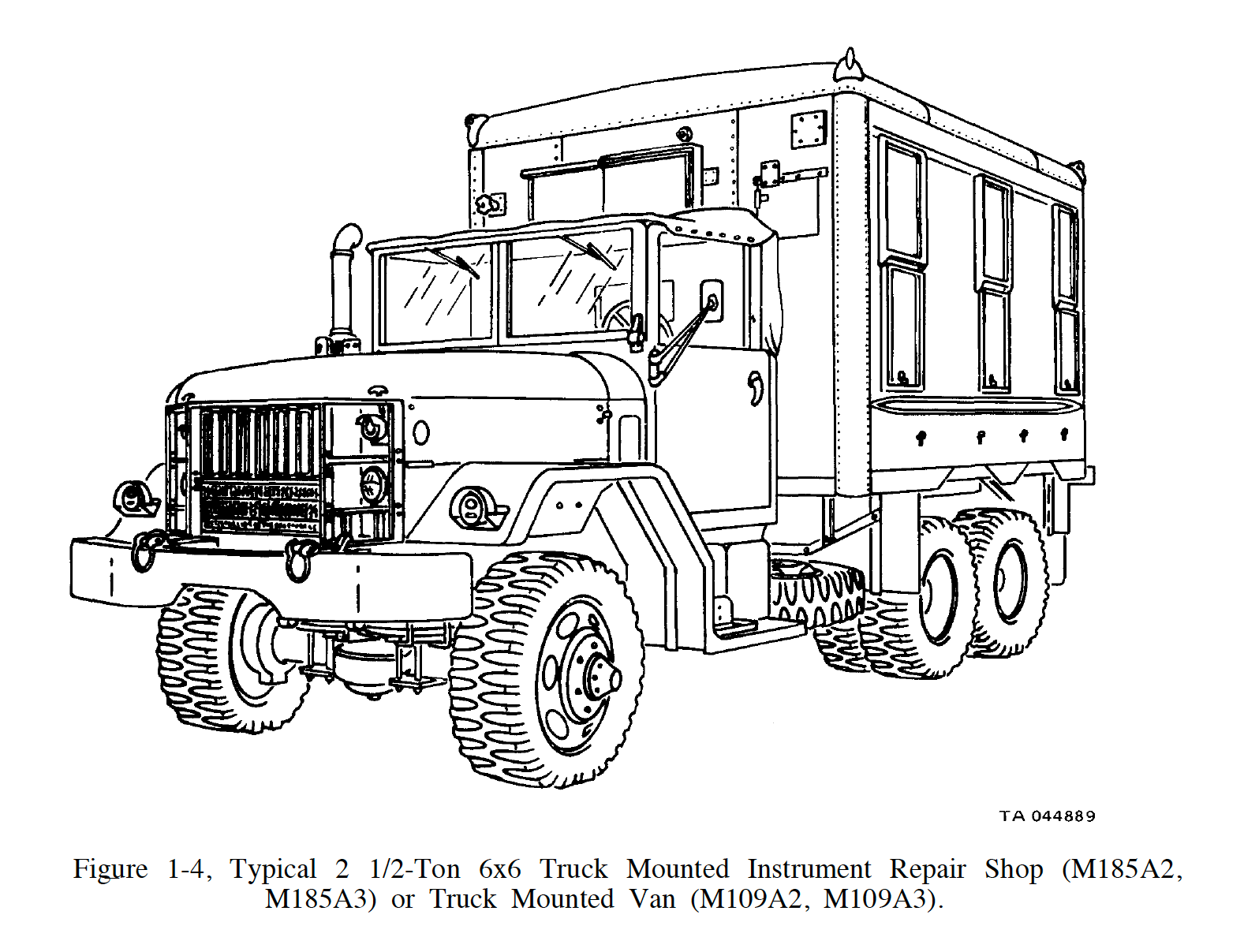
M109 Van Truck

The CCKW, M35, and M135 had a 12 ft (3.66 m) van model on a long wheelbase. These could be equipped for many different roles. The M35 also had a 17 ft (5.18 m) model with slide-out sections on both sides. Van bodies were used for medical, communication, machine, repair, and other shops. They could have different sizes, window arrangements, and other special equipment. "Expansible" vans are used for communication equipment.

=== Chassis cabs ===
The GMC CCKW and M35 series had chassis cabs in different wheelbases for specialty bodies. Maintenance, engineer, water purification, pole-setting, air compressors, firefighting, and other equipment were also mounted on chassis cabs.

== See also ==
- Einheits-LKW der Wehrmacht – Nazi Germany's standardized 2½-ton, 6×6 truck for WWII, of which under 15,000 were made

== General references ==
- Crismon, Frederick W. (1995). International Trucks. Motorbooks International. ISBN 978-0-7603-0069-5.
- Crismon, Fred W (2001). US Military Wheeled Vehicles (3 ed.). Victory WW2. pp. 356–362. ISBN 978-0-9700567-1-9.
- Doyle, David (2003). Standard Catalog of U.S. Military Vehicles (2 ed.). Krause. pp. 105–160. ISBN 978-0-87349-508-0. Archived from the original on 15 January 2018.
- Hyde, Charles K. (2014). Images from the Arsenal of Democracy. Wayne State Univ. pp. 203–207. ISBN 978-0-8143-3982-4.
- Ware, Pat (2014). The Illustrated Guide to Military Vehicles. Anness. pp. 238–239. ISBN 978-1-78214-192-1.
- TM 9-500 Data Sheets for Ordnance Type Material (PDF). US Dept. of the Army. 1962. pp. Sec. 21.
- TM 9-801 Truck, 2 1/2-ton 6×6 GMC CCKW-352 & 353 (PDF). US War Dept. 1944. pp. 13–14, 35–40.
- TM 9-807 2 1/2 ton 6×6 Truck and 2 1/2 to 5-ton 6×4 Truck (Studebaker Models US6 and US6×4) (PDF). US War Dept. 1943.
- TM 9-819 2 1/2 ton 6×6 Cargo truck M34 (and others) (PDF). US Dept. of the Army. 1952.
- TM 9-819A 2 1/2-ton 6×6 truck M135 (PDF). US Dept. of the Army. 1951.
- TM 9-2320-209-10-1 Operation, Installation, and Reference Data Operator Level 2 1/2-ton, 6×6, M44A1 and M44A2 Series Trucks (Multifuel) (PDF). US Dept. of the Army. 1989.
- TM 9-2320-361-10 Operator's Manual for 2 1/2-ton, 6×6, M44A2 Series Trucks (Multifuel) (PDF). US Dept. of the Army. 1988. Archived from the original (PDF) on 17 June 2019.
- TM 9-2800 Military Vehicles (PDF). US Dept. of the Army. 1947.
- TM 9-2800 Military Vehicles (PDF). US Depts. of the Army. 1953. pp. 222–242.
