= Red Ball Express =

Allied truck convoy system during WWII

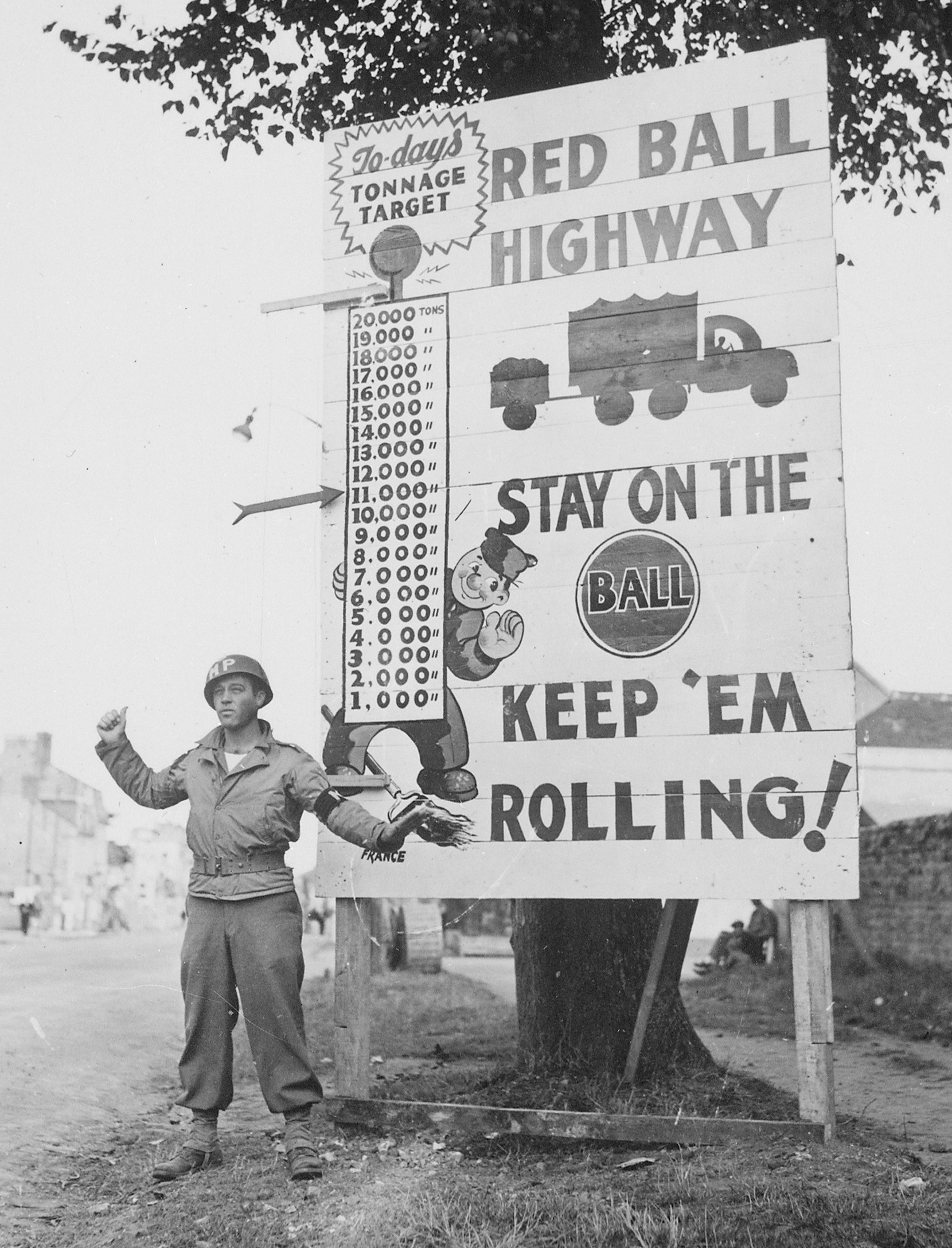
Military policeman and sign posted along the Red Ball route

The Red Ball Express was an American truck convoy system that supplied Allied forces moving through Europe after breaking out from the D-Day beaches in Normandy in the summer of 1944. To expedite cargo shipments to the front, trucks emblazoned with red balls followed two similarly marked routes (one forth, and another one back) that were closed to civilian traffic, so regulated by Military Police. (Note: By using two roughly parallel strings of single-roadway, two-lane highways, the system could be (and was, by design) run as an express highway with two roadways, with two lanes going in the same direction each. This allowed the trucks to maintain, and often exceed, a targeted average speed of 35 mph (56 km/h), and overtake trucks that could no longer keep up, without having to avoid any oncoming traffic.) The trucks also had priority on regular roads.

Conceived in an urgent 38-hour meeting, the convoy system began operating on 25 August 1944. About three quarters of its staffing were African-American soldiers, making the Red Ball and its spin-off routes a very early (at least de facto) non-segregated branch in the U.S. military. The Red Ball Express at its peak operated 5,958 vehicles that carried up to 12,500 tons of supplies a day to the front line. Including spin-off side routes, that cut more directly to the north-east and south-east, to supply a front-line that was hundreds of miles wide, a total of 23,000 drivers were active at one point — given that the Express system used two drivers per truck, the whole network was eventually running an estimated 11,500 trucks active, excluding many trucks that were discarded. (Note: Despite these numbers, the 6,000 trucks on the Red Ball main line were treated as a rounding error next to the 600,000 2½-ton 6×6 trucks the U.S. had made uptil then. Trucks had to average at least 35 mph (56 km/h); those that could no longer maintain 25 mph (40 km/h) had to take the next right and park. Trucks that couldn't maintain 20 mph (32 km/h) were called 'rolling obstacles' and had to pull-over immediately, onto a side berm, or into a ditch. Drivers could flag down a vehicle repair workshop truck regularly, but mechanics applied brutal triage. On trucks that could be fixed in 15 min, the effort was made, else the truck was disposed of.) German PoWs interrogated after the war called it a "never-ending river of trucks", baffled by the total absence of horses. The system ran for 83 days until 16 November, when the port facilities at Antwerp, Belgium, were opened, and enough French rail lines were repaired, and portable gasoline pipelines were deployed to forward fuel dumps and depots.

== History ==
Use of the term "Red Ball" to describe express cargo service dated at least to the end of the 19th century. Around 1892, the Santa Fe railroad began using it to refer to express shipping for priority freight and perishables. Such trains and the tracks cleared for their use were marked with red balls. The term grew in popularity and was extensively used by the 1920s.

The need for such a transport service during World War II arose in the European Theater after the successful Allied invasion at Normandy in June 1944. To hobble the German army's ability to move forces and bring up reinforcements in a counter-attack, the Allies had bombed the French railway system into ruins in the weeks before the D-Day landing.

At the time of the landing, French ports were mostly inoperable and, after supporting the troops of the Allied invasion, the Normandy beaches needed to become the makeshift port that would supply the march toward Germany. The temporary piers and docks known as Mulberry harbours that would create the port had been towed from England and had, by the end of June, unloaded 170,000 vehicles, 7.5 million US gallons (28,000,000 litres) of fuel and 500,000 tons of supplies. Some 28 Allied divisions needed constant resupply. During offensive operations, each division consumed about 750 tons of supplies per day (about 100 pounds (45 kg) per man) totaling about 21,000 tons. The only way to deliver them was by truck – thereby giving birth to the Red Ball Express.

At its peak, it operated 5,958 vehicles and carried about 12,500 tons of supplies per day. Colonel Loren Albert Ayers, known to his men as "Little Patton", was in charge of gathering two drivers for every truck, obtaining special equipment, and training port battalion personnel as drivers for long hauls. Able-bodied soldiers attached to other units whose duties were not critical were made drivers. Almost 75% of Red Ball drivers were black.

Over 38 hours of planning, 132 existing military trucking operations were combined into a truck force composed primarily of 2.5-ton GMC "Jimmys" and 1.5 ton Dodges. The Dodge trucks had a reputation for reliability, while the more plentiful GMCs were prone to break down. The larger concept of the Express and its routing would be the work of General Dwight D. Eisenhower, based on a French model. (Eisenhower’s experience would shape the new U.S. Interstate Highway System in the 1950s)

To keep supplies flowing, two routes were opened from Cherbourg (Cherbourg-en-Cotentin since 2016) to the forward logistics base at Chartres. The northern route was used for delivering supplies, the southern for returning trucks. Both roads were closed to civilian traffic.

The highways in France are usually good, but are ordinarily not excessively wide. The needs of the rapidly advancing armies, consequently, promptly put the greatest possible demands upon them. To ease this strain, main highways leading to the front were set aside very early in the advance as "one way" roads from which all civil and local military traffic were barred. Tens of thousands of truckloads of supplies were pushed forward over these one way roads in a constant stream of traffic. Reaching the supply dumps in the forward areas, the trucks unloaded and returned empty to Arromanches, Cherbourg and the lesser landing places by way of other one way highways. Even the French railroads were, to some degree, operated similarly, with loaded trains moving forward almost nose to tail.

— Hawthorne Daniel, For Want of a Nail: The Influence of Logistics on War (1948)

The Red Ball was at the center of a number of other named supply tracks. The Green Diamond operated in the region of Cherbourg; the White Ball from Le Havre to Paris; the Lions Express between Bayeux and Brussels; and the ABC Express eastward from Antwerp.

Only convoys of at least five trucks were allowed, escorted in front and behind by a jeep. In reality, it was common for single trucks to depart Cherbourg as soon as they were loaded. It was also common to disable the engine governors to travel faster than 56 miles per hour (90 km/h).

Convoys were a primary target of the German Luftwaffe but by 1944 German air power was so reduced that even these tempting and typically easy targets were rarely attacked. The biggest problems facing the Express were maintaining the trucks, finding enough drivers, and lack of sleep for the overworked truckers.

The natural enemy of the Express was mud. The trucks used 11-inch (28 cm) wheels that could be easily overwhelmed. Efforts to escape the mud could burn out transmissions; dried mud could immobilize their brakes.

To control traffic and provide security for the route, the 793rd Military Police Battalion, activated in December 1942, was sent to the Red Ball from August through December 1944. This service is commemorated on the 793rd insignia, which displays two red balls on a diagonal line of yellow, with a field of green behind (green and gold are the colors of the U.S. Army Military Police).

== Gallery ==
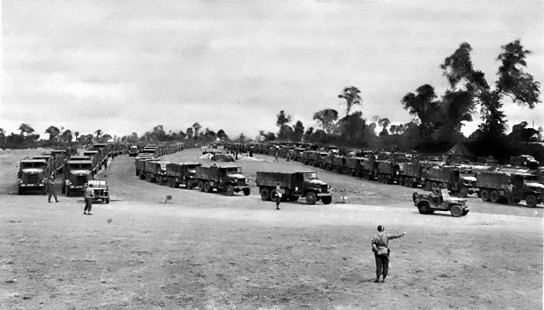
Red Ball Express trucks moving through a Regulating Point, 1944

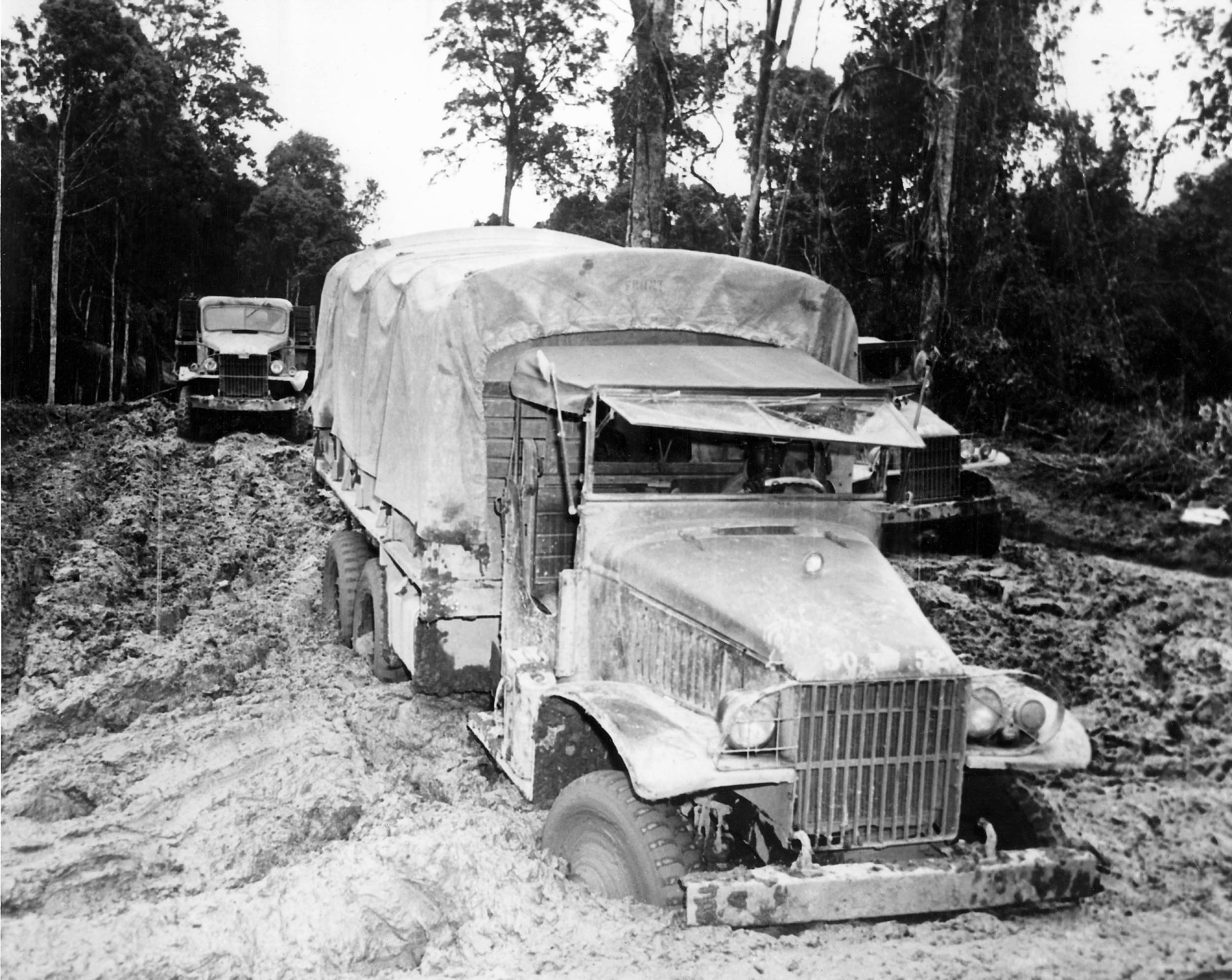
A Red Ball Express truck stuck in the mud, 1944

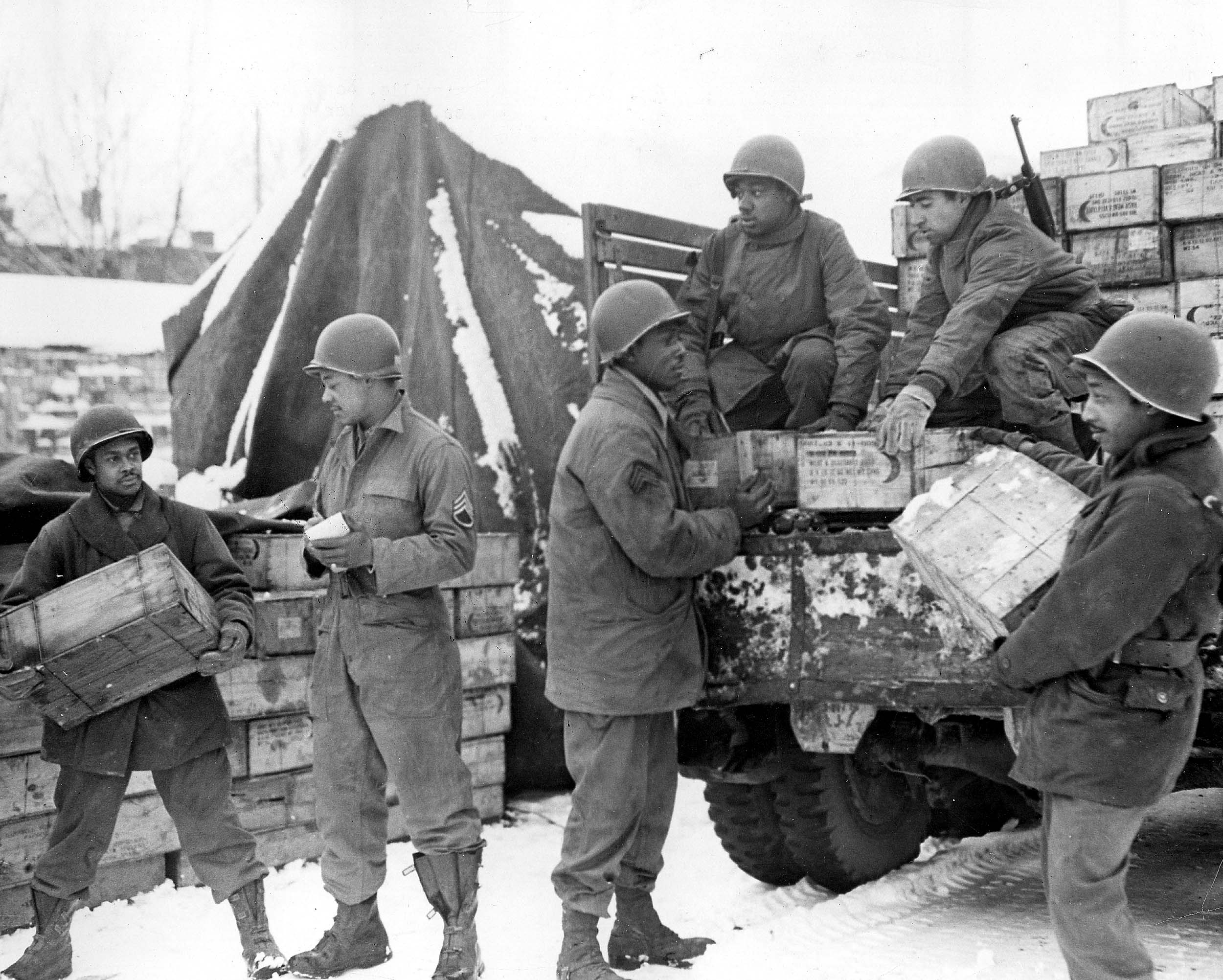
Soldiers of the 4185th Quartermaster Service Company loading Red Ball Express truck, Liège, Belgium, 1944

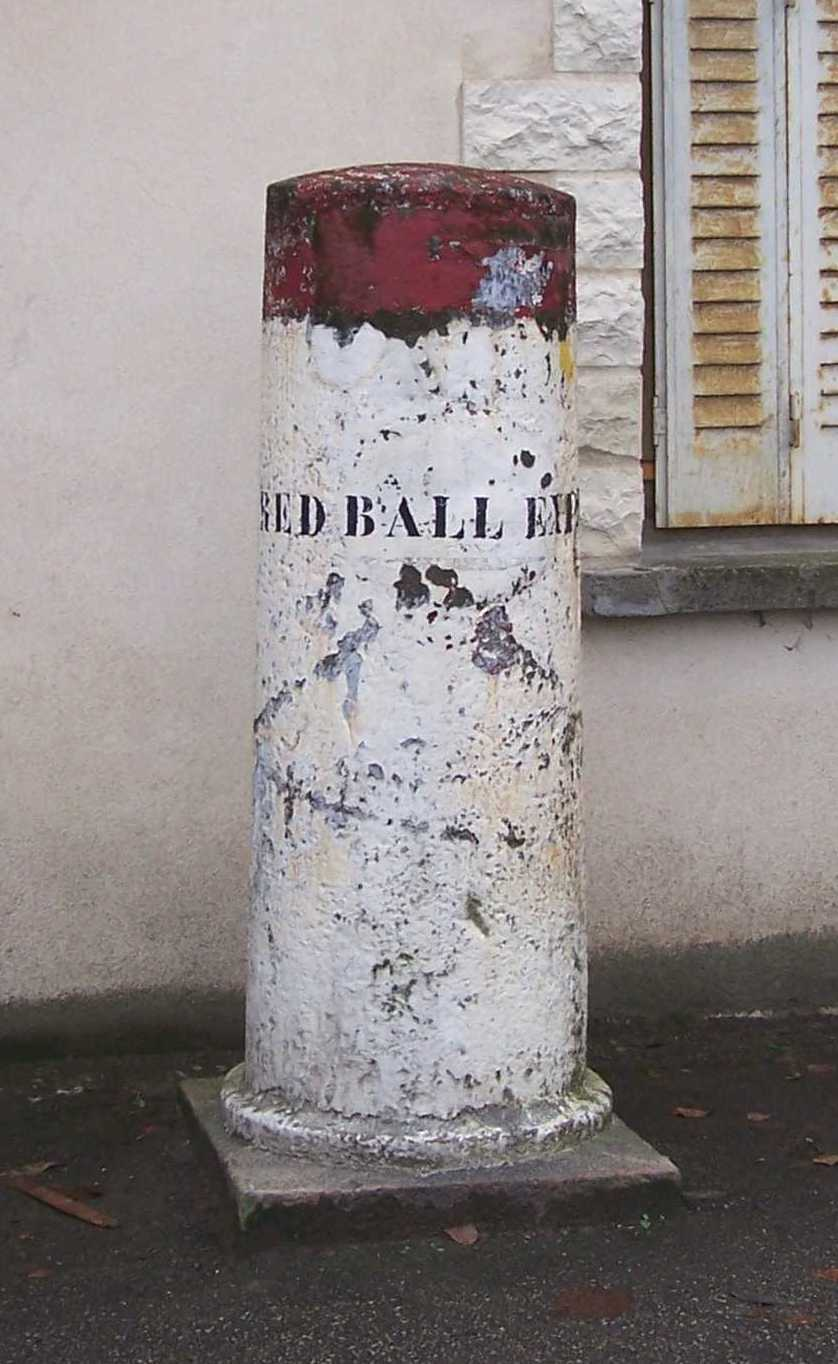
Commemorative stone in the village of La Queue-lez-Yvelines

== See also ==
- Military history of African Americans
- Red Ball Express, a 1952 film loosely based on the Red Ball Express
- Roll Out, a 1973–74 television series based on the Red Ball Express
