= GMC CCKW 2½-ton 6×6 truck =

US WWII "deuce and a half" cargo truck

CCKW
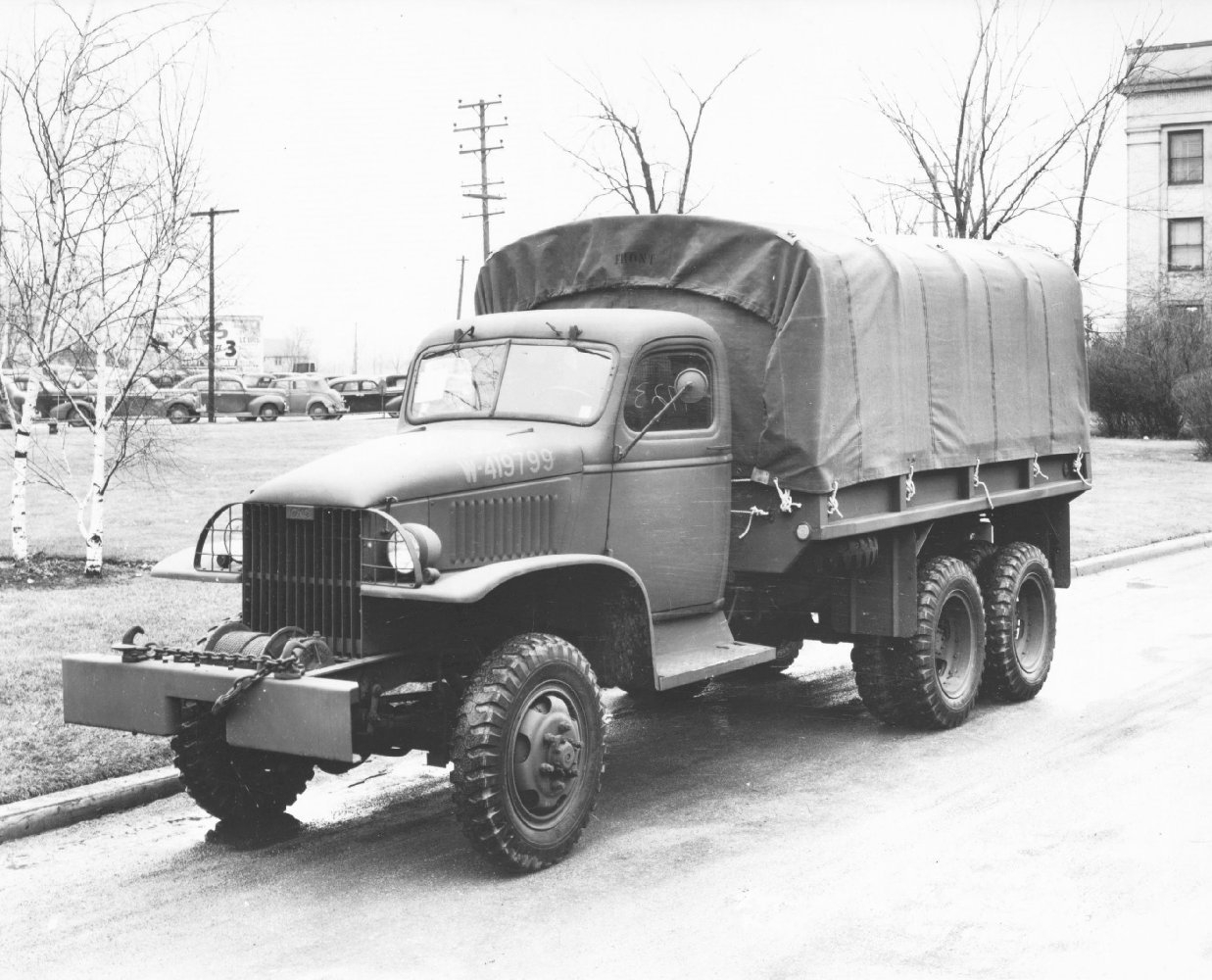
- CCKW 353 cargo truck with winch
- Type: 2 1/2-ton 6×6 Cargo truck
- Place of origin: United States

Service history
- Wars: World War II, Korean War

Production history
- Designer: Yellow Truck and Coach Co.
- Designed: 1941
- Manufacturer: Yellow/GMC Truck and Coach; Chevrolet
- Produced: 1941–1945
- No. built: Grand Total: ~572,500 including all variants; CCKW specific: ~518,000 — LWB CCKW-353: ~464,000 and — SWB CCKW-352: ~54,000 units plus ~54,500 non CCKW variants
- Variants: 1939 ACKWX – 2,466 units C.O.E. AFKWX – 7,235 units 6×4 CCW-353 – 23,649 units DUKW amphibs – 21,147 units

Specifications (353 Cargo w/winch)
- Mass: 8,800 lb (4,000 kg) empty 16,400 lb (7,400 kg) loaded
- Length: 270 1/8 in (6.86 m)
- Width: 88 in (2.24 m)
- Height: 93 in (2.36 m) to cab 109 1/8 in (2.77 m) overall
- Armor: not applicable
- Main armament: .50 caliber M2 Browning belt-fed machine gun, but only on trucks with ring-mount for it.
- Engine: GMC 270 straight-6 91.5 hp (68.2 kW) at 2,750 rpm or 104 hp (78 kW) at 2,750 rpm
- Transmission: 5-speed manual × 2-range transfer case
- Suspension: Beam axles on leaf springs
- Fuel capacity: 40 US gal (150 L)
- Operational range: 300 mi (480 km)
- Maximum speed: 45 mph (72 km/h)

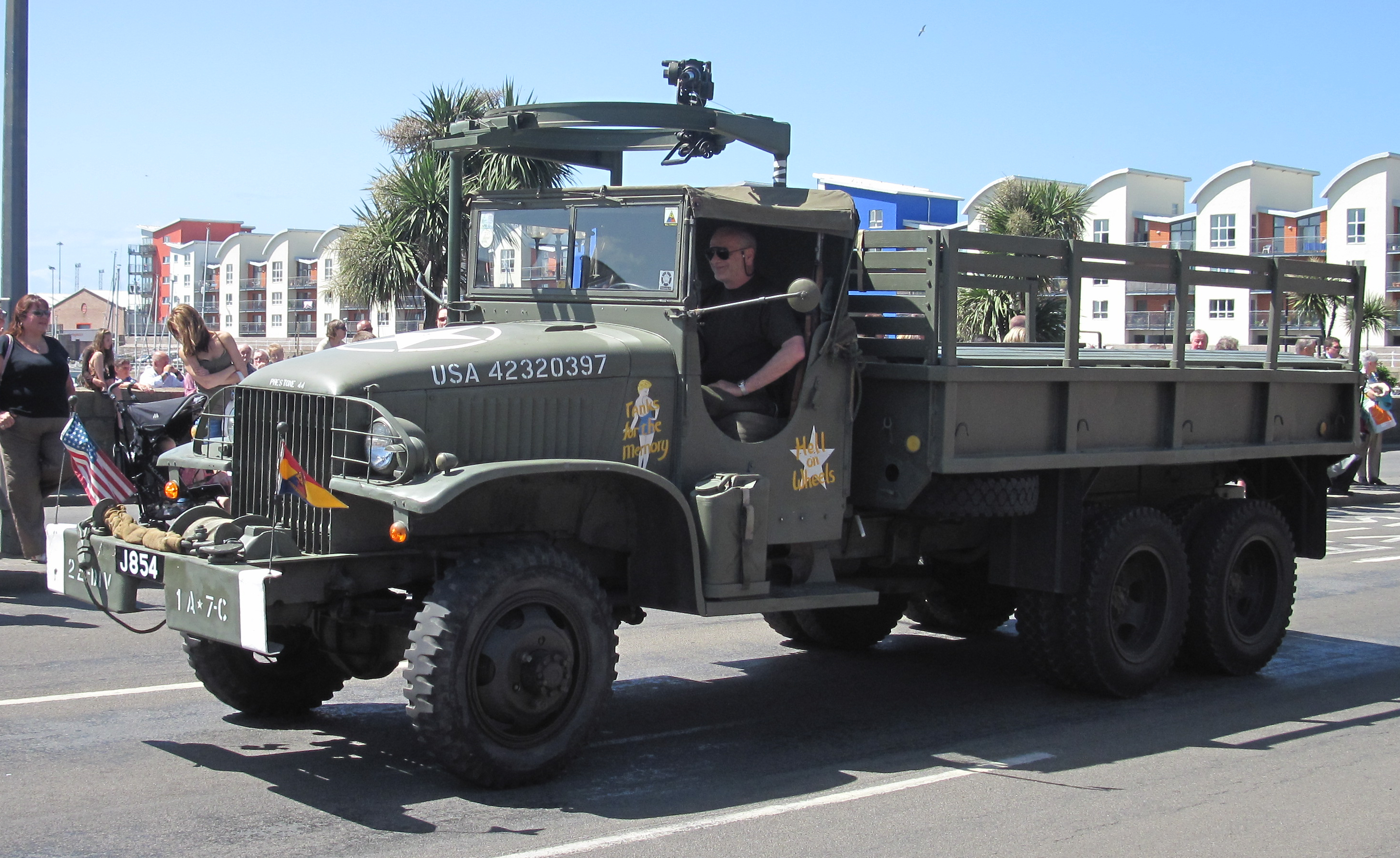
Restored CCKW 353 Cargo truck with open cab, machine gun ring, and front-mounted winch

The GMC CCKW "Deuce (and a half)", also called "Jimmy", or G-508 by its U.S. Ordnance Corps Supply Catalog number, (Note: The U.S. Army Ordnance Corps' group number ('G-number'), or Standard Nomenclature List (SNL) number for ordering supply items from a comprehensive list of U.S. Army weapons by supply catalog designation in World War II.) was the main series of standard U.S. Army (cargo) trucks for World War II. Mass-produced from 1941 to 1945, designed with uniform technology and interchangeable parts, these off-road capable, 2 1/2-ton, 6×6 trucks formed the backbone of the Army's World War II road logistics fleet, (Note: The U.S. military also moved much freight by rail, as soon as tracks had been repaired) and thus saw heavy service in WW II, and later also in the Korean War. Thousands of these trucks were scrambled for the improvized Red Ball Express that kept Allied armies supplied as they outran their supply lines, rushing eastward, liberating France after the Normandy invasion.

The CCKW came in many variants, including open or closed cab, long wheelbase (LWB) CCKW-353 and short (SWB) CCKW-352, and over a score of specialized variants, but the bulk were general purpose cargo models. A large minority were built with a front-mounted winch, and one in four of the cabs had a ring above the co-driver's position, for mounting a .50-Cal M2 Browning machine-gun.

Of the almost 2.4 million trucks that the U.S. Army bought between 1939 and December 1945, across all payload weight classes (including 1/4-ton "trucks" aka jeeps), some 812,000, or just over one third, were so-called 2 1/2-ton trucks, that were 5-ton rated on-road. GMC's total production of the CCKW and its variants, including the 2 1/2-ton, 6x6, amphibian DUKW, and the 6×4, 5-ton (on-road) CCW-353, amounted to some 572,500 units – almost a quarter of the total WW II U.S. truck production, and 70 percent of the total 2 1/2-ton trucks. GMC's total of ~550,000 purely 6×6 models, including the DUKW, formed the overwhelming majority of the ~675,000 six by six 2 1/2-ton trucks, and came in less than 100,000 shy of the almost 640,000 1 1/4-ton jeeps. Additionally, GM built over 150,000 units of the CCKW's smaller brother, the 1 1/2-ton, 4×4 Chevrolet G506, at the same factory.

The GMC CCKW began to be phased out once the M35 series trucks were first deployed in the 1950s, but remained in active U.S. service until the mid-1960s. Eventually, the M35 series, originally developed by REO Motors, succeeded the CCKW as the U.S. Army's standard 2 1/2-ton, 6×6 cargo truck.

== Etymology ==
The name CCKW comes from GMC model nomenclature:

- "C", designed in 1941
- "C", conventional cab
- "K", all-wheel drive
- "W", dual rear axles
- "X", experimental chassis / non-standard wheelbase (first 13,188 units)

== History ==
In 1939 and 1940, the US Army Ordnance Corps was developing 2 1/2 short tons (2,300 kg) load-rated (off-road rating) 6×6 tactical trucks that could operate off-road in all weather. General Motors, already supplying modified commercial trucks to the Army, modified the 1939 ACKWX – built for the French Army – into the CCKW. The General Motors design was chosen by the Army and went into production at GM's Yellow Truck and Coach division's Pontiac, Michigan plant alongside 6×4 CCWs. Later, they were also manufactured at GM's St. Louis, Missouri Chevrolet plant.

== Production numbers ==
Sources do not precisely agree on the total numbers of CCKWs built by the end of production in 1945. Ware (2010) lists one single number of 562,750 of CCKW trucks, built across all variants—presumably including the amphibian DUKW. More clearly specified numbers are provided by Sunderlin in Army Motors magazine, and by Jackson, using the numbers found in the 1946 revision of the U.S. military's Summary Report of Acceptances, Tank-Automotive Materiel. Sunderlin reports a total of 528,829 of 2 1/2-ton 6×6 units (excluding the DUKW) produced by GMC—versus a total of 527,168 accepted by the U.S. Army. Jackson's tabulation of the 1946 U.S. acceptance numbers adds up to 524,873 units, excluding the DUKWs and the ACKWX predecessor models. Both of these numbers still include the cab-over engine AFKWX-353 models—leaving a total of some 518,000–519,000 actual CCKW-352 and CCKW-353 units. In addition, GMC serial numbers indicate a production of 23,500 of the same bodied 6x4 CCW models, versus 23,649 units accepted by U.S. ordnance.

In any case, GM / GMC built a total number of 2 1/2-ton, 6-wheeled trucks that was second only to the WWII "Jeep" —and neither Ford nor Willys individually built as many jeeps during the war.

== Specifications ==
=== Engine and drive-line ===
The CCKW was equipped with the GMC 270 engine, an overhead valve inline-6 with 91.5 hp (68.2 kW) or 104 hp (78 kW) at 2,750 rpm, and 216 lb⋅ft (293 N⋅m) at 1,400 rpm. A 3 25/32 in (96 mm) bore by 4 in (102 mm) stroke gave a 269.5 cu in (4.4 L) displacement. This gasoline engine was designed for commercial trucks, and was reliable in service.

The transmission was a Warner T93 5-speed with a direct 4th gear and overdrive 5th gear. The transfer case had high and low gears, and engaged the front axle. Originally all axles were a Timken split type, later trucks also used GM "banjo" types.

=== Chassis ===
The CCKW had a ladder frame chassis with three driven beam axles, the front on leaf springs, the rear tandem on leaf springs with locating arms. There were two wheelbases, the short Model 352 and the long Model 353. The short, 145 in (368 cm) (Note: Measurements are from the centerline of the front axle to the centerline of rear bogie.) was used with a short cargo bed as an artillery prime mover for 75 mm (3.0 in) and 105 mm (4.1 in) howitzers. All other models used the long 164 in (417 cm) wheelbase. Tires were 7.50-20, brakes were hydraulic with vacuum assist.

Some were fitted with 10,000 lbf (4,500 kp; 44 kN) front-mounted winches. A winch added 300 pounds (140 kg) and 14 inches (36 cm).

Some open cab chassis were cut in half behind the cab for air transport. Each half was a load, at the vehicle's destination, the halves were bolted back together.

== Versions ==
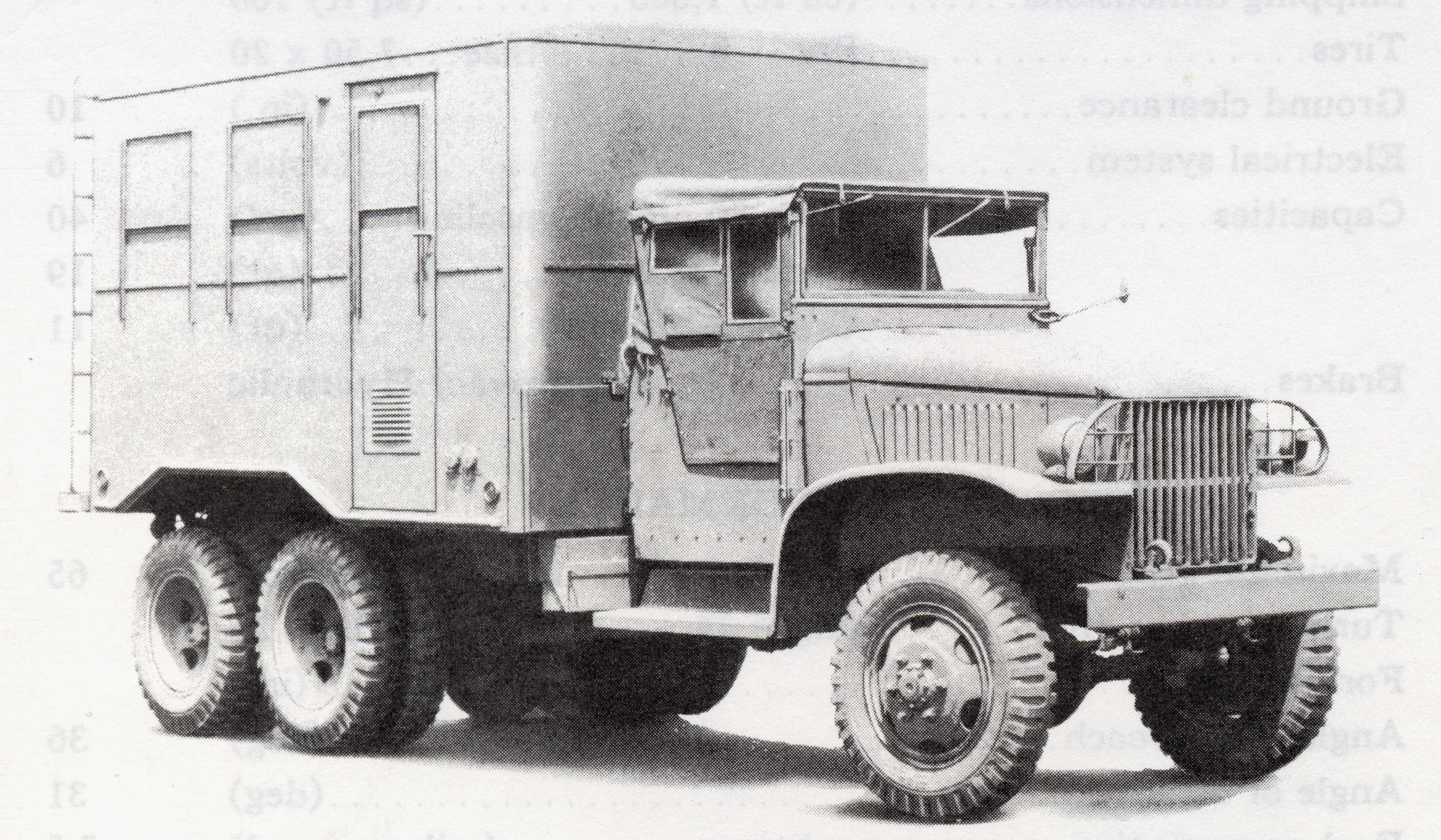
Van body with canvas roof and doors in place

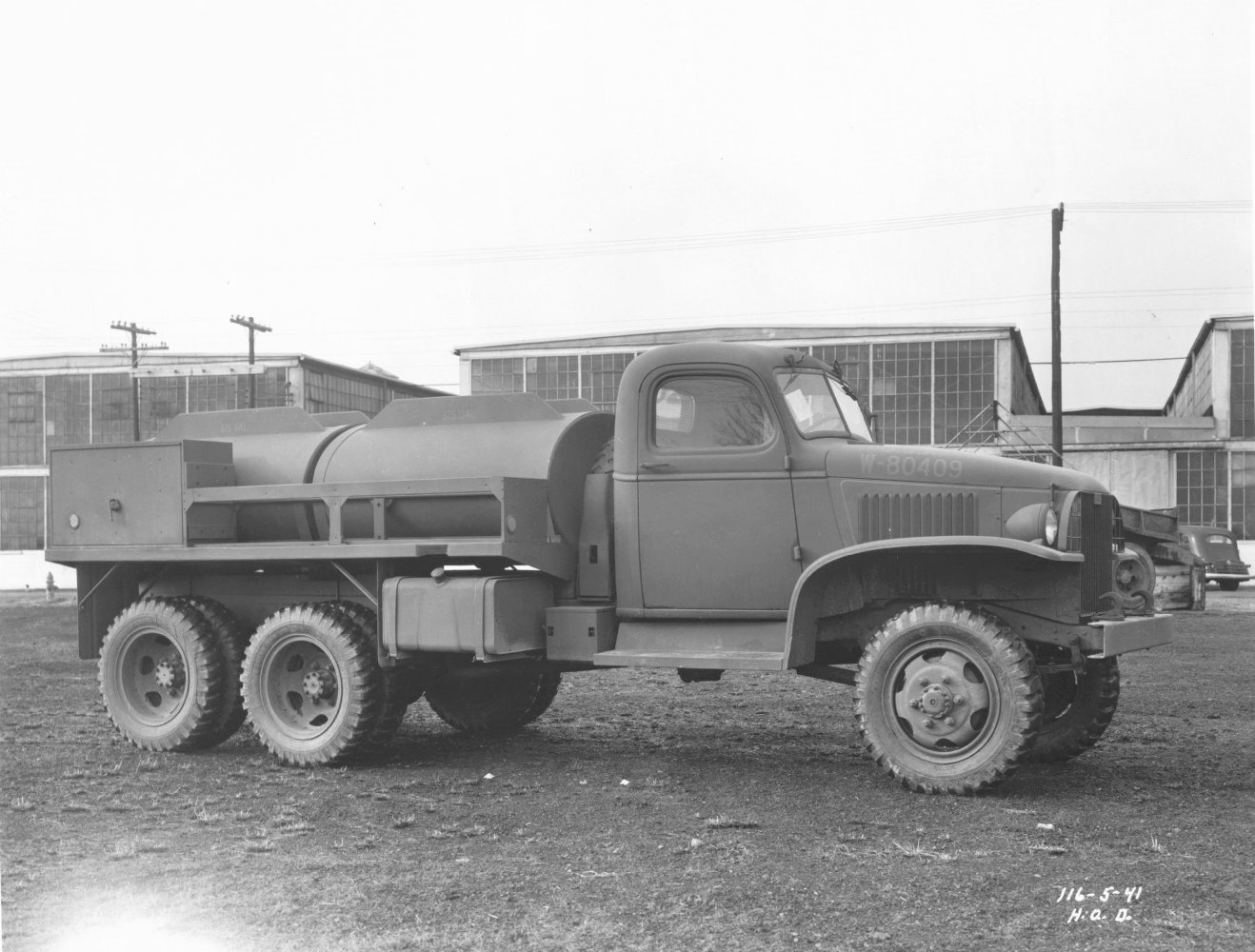
Gasoline tanker (750 US gal (2,800 L))

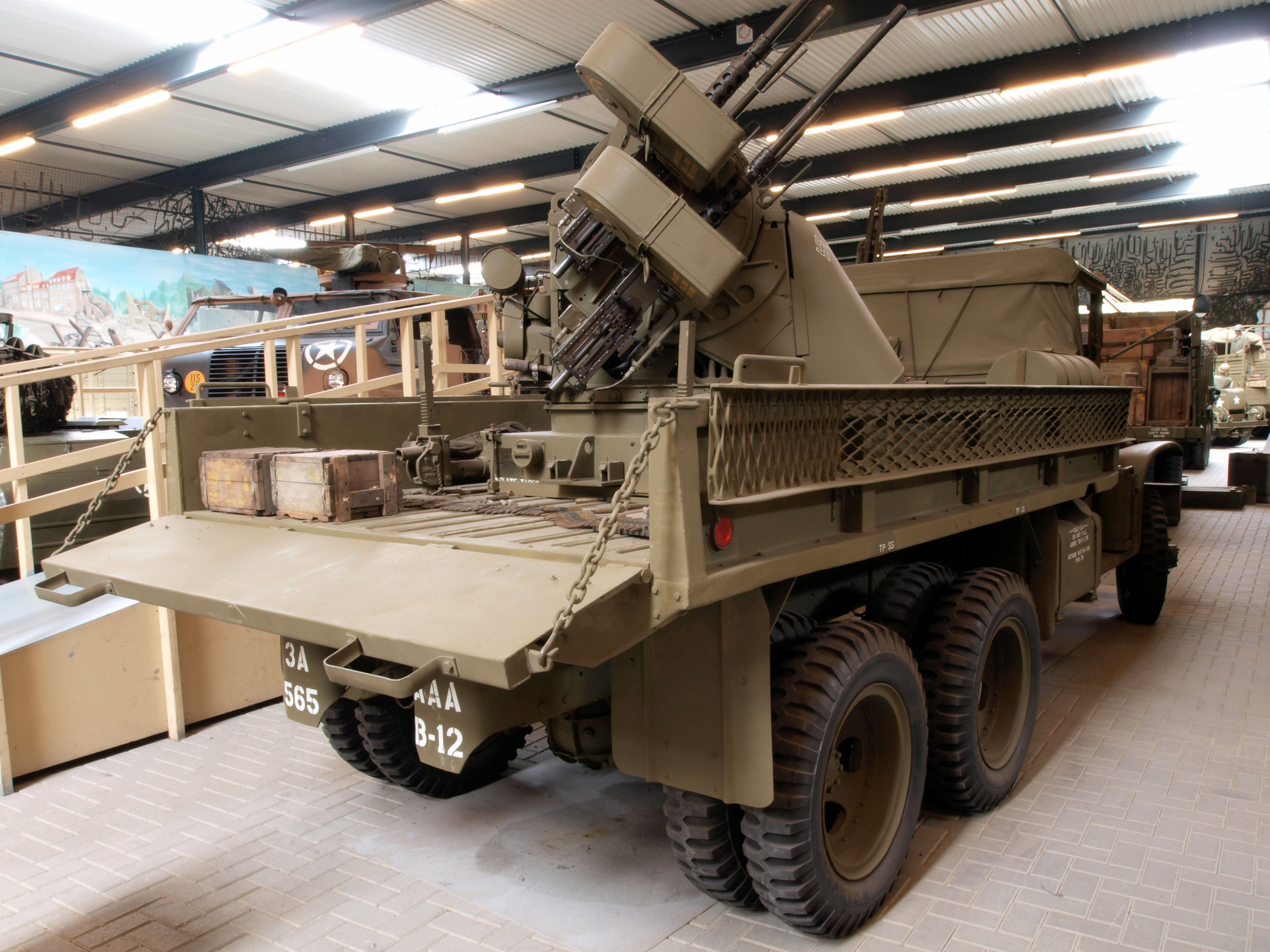
CCKW-353-B2 gun truck with M45 Quadmount on M20 trailer in bed, loading ramps attached to side

Initially, all versions used a modified commercial AK series truck closed cab design having a metal roof and doors. By 1944, an open cab version, with a canvas roof and doors, was used. This was easier to build, and the roof could be removed to lower the shipping height. 1 in 4 of cabs had a machine gun mounting ring above the co-driver's position.

The CCKW provided a platform for the widest range of bodies on any U.S. military vehicle, with the 12 ft (3.7 m) cargo version being the most common. As steel was more heavily rationed during the course of the war, the steel cargo bed was replaced by a wooden one. Wooden beds proved unsatisfactory and a 'composite' bed with steel sides, framing, and wooden bottom slats was developed. However, the composite bed was still unsatisfactory and the bed design returned to all steel. Standard cargo models had beds with fixed sides and a drop tailgate, as well as folding troop seats.

A standard rectangular van configuration was used in communications, medical, workshop, and many other specialty roles. Special built vans were also used.

=== Specialized variants ===
Many specialized variants of the basic 6×6 CCKW were made, some in small numbers, including some converted in the field. These include:

- Air compressor
- Bomb service
- Chemical decontaminating
- Chemical handling
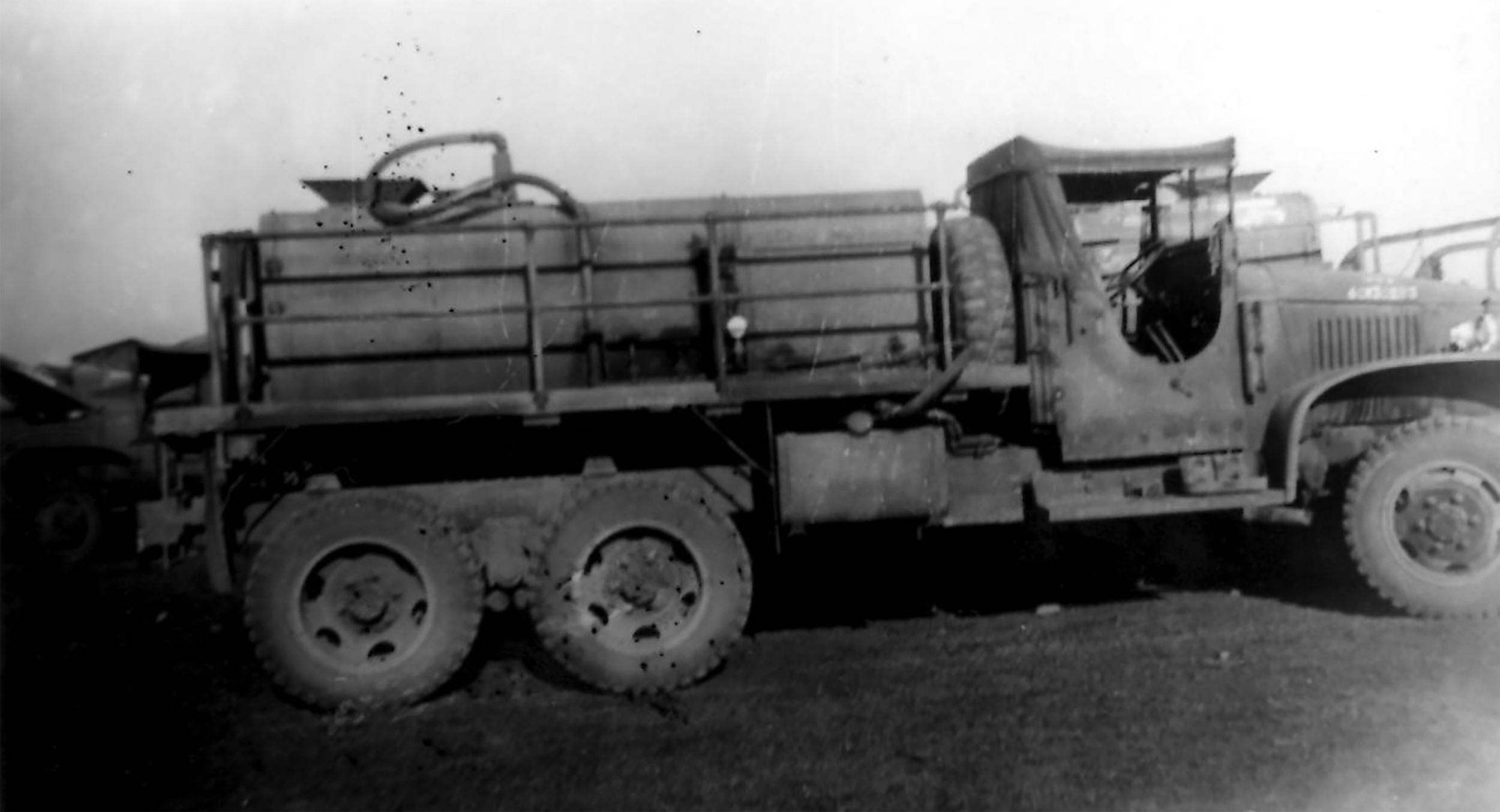
  US WWII Chemical Warfare Truck, Side View
- Dental operating van
- Dump truck
- Fire engine
- Fuel & gas tankers (750 US gal (2,800 L))
- Fuel & oil handling (660 US gal (2,500 L)), (750 US gal (2,800 L))
- High lift
- K-53 radio equip. van
- K-60 radio equip. van
- Map reproduction van
- Ordnance maintenance van
- Pipeline equipment
- Ponton bolster
- Semi-trailer tractor - GMC CCKW-352-B1
- Shop equipment GP repair van
- Surgical van
- Water purification van
- Water tanker (700 US gal (2,600 L))
- Welder's truck

=== ACK-353 ===
The ACK-353 (A for 1939 design, C for conventional cab, and K for all wheel drive) 1 1/2-ton 4×4 truck was the smaller brother of the ACKWX, and a predecessor to the Chevrolet G506, competing with the Dodge / Fargo T-203 / VF-400 series, as GM was at that time also trying to clinch the lucrative contract for the standard World War II cargo trucks in the 1 1/2-ton 4×4 category.

The ACK-353 was equipped with the new for 1939 GMC 248 engine, an overhead valve, low-deck inline-six with a 3 23/32 in (94 mm) bore and 3 13/16 in (97 mm) stroke, resulting in a 248 cu in (4.1 L) displacement, producing 77 brake horsepower (57 kW) (net). The transmission was a four-speed manual, combined with a two-speed transfer-case engaging the front axle for all-wheel drive operation.

The truck rode on a 157 3/4 in (401 cm) wheelbase, measuring 256 in (650 cm) long, 90 in (229 cm) wide, and 117 in (297 cm) tall – or 89 in (226 cm) with the rear top bows taken down. Tires were 7.50-20, and weight came in at 7,532 lb (3,416 kg). A special feature were the front hubs, designed to take dual wheels in especially challenging terrain.

Fitted with steel GS bodies with fixed sides and troop seats, the trucks were originally ordered under French contract, but ended up in use by the British Army, although some 2,000 units delivered to the French in early 1940 were used from June 1940 to reequip the infantry of the light mechanized divisions whose equipment had been lost at Dunkirk. Some were kept in service by the Armistice Army and others likely fell into the hands of the Nazi Germany Wehrmacht.

=== ACKWX-353 ===
The ACKWX-353 (A for 1939 design, C for conventional cab, K for all wheel drive, W for tandem rear axles, and X for non-standard chassis) three-ton 6x6 truck was the direct predecessor from which the CCKW was developed. Fitted with the same 77 horsepower (57 kW) drivetrain as the ACK, the trucks weighed 9,856 lb (4,471 kg), and measured 264 in (671 cm) long, 94.5 in (240 cm) wide, and 118 in (300 cm) tall / or 90 in (229 cm) to cab.

Some 1,000 of the 3-ton 6x6 trucks were originally contracted by France, but – just like the 4×4 ACK trucks – after the defeat of the French, diverted to Britain in 1940. The British however, deemed the trucks unfavorable for use in the war, due to their long wheelbase and lacking power, and diverted them to the USSR in turn, in 1941. A total of 2,466 ACKWX trucks were built — both according to GMC's serial numbers, as well as the U.S. Army's acceptance figures.

=== AFKWX-353 ===
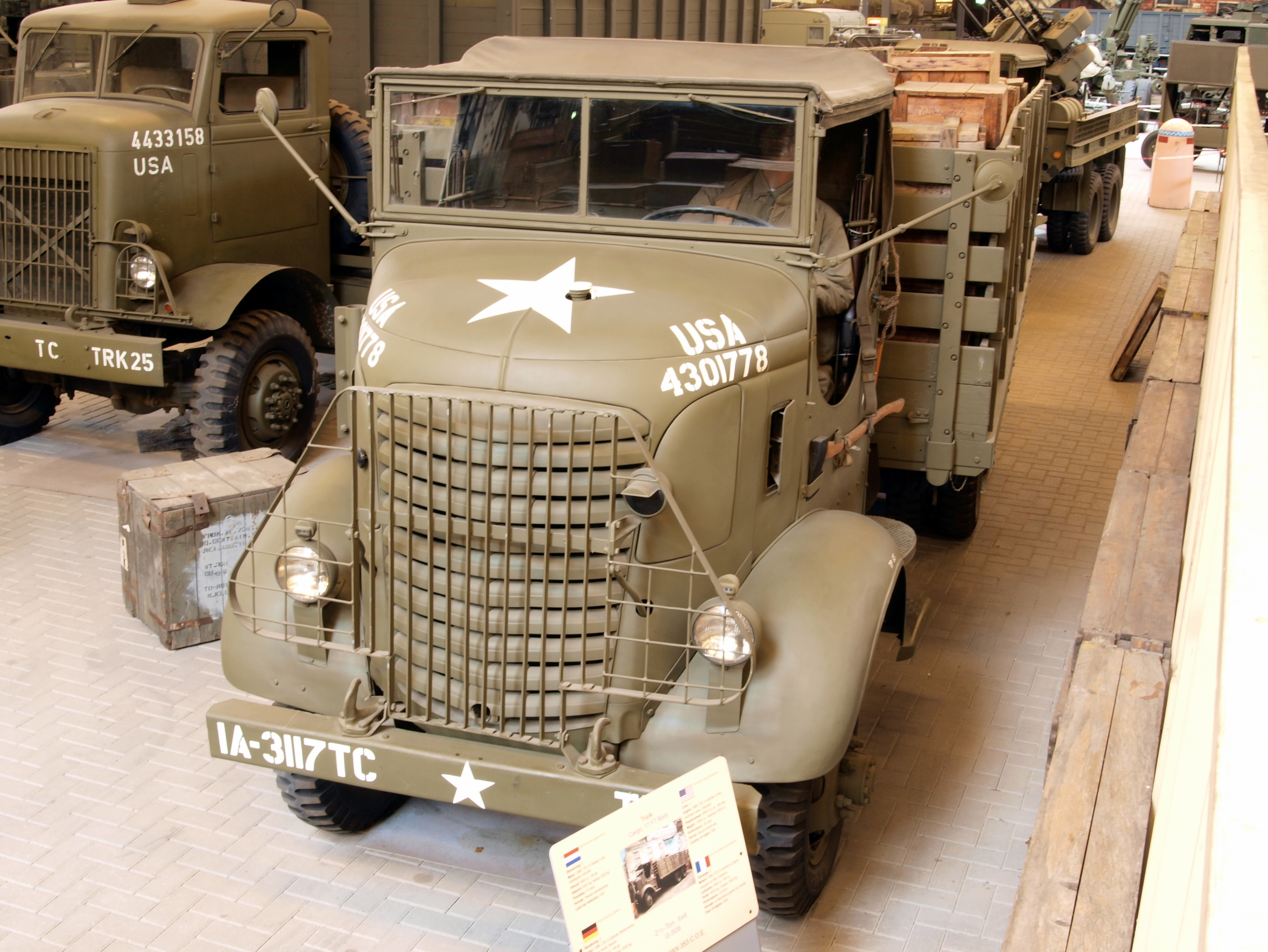
GMC AFKWX-353 cab-over-engine

The AFKWX (A for 1939 design, F for forward cab, K for all wheel drive, W for tandem rear axles, and X for non-standard chassis) 353, a cab over engine, long cargo bed version of the CCKW, went into production alongside it in 1942 at Yellow's Pontiac plant and Chevrolet's in St. Louis. Otherwise mechanically identical, its compact cabin design allowed a 15 ft (4.57 m), and later 17 ft (5.18 m) cargo bed to be fitted. Only the first 50 units produced had closed cabs, all others were open. None had a front-mounted winch. The cab over design made engine maintenance difficult. As a result, only 7,235 were built, – 2,232 units with the 15 ft (4.6 m) body, and 5,000 of the 17 ft (5.2 m) version.

=== CCW-353 ===
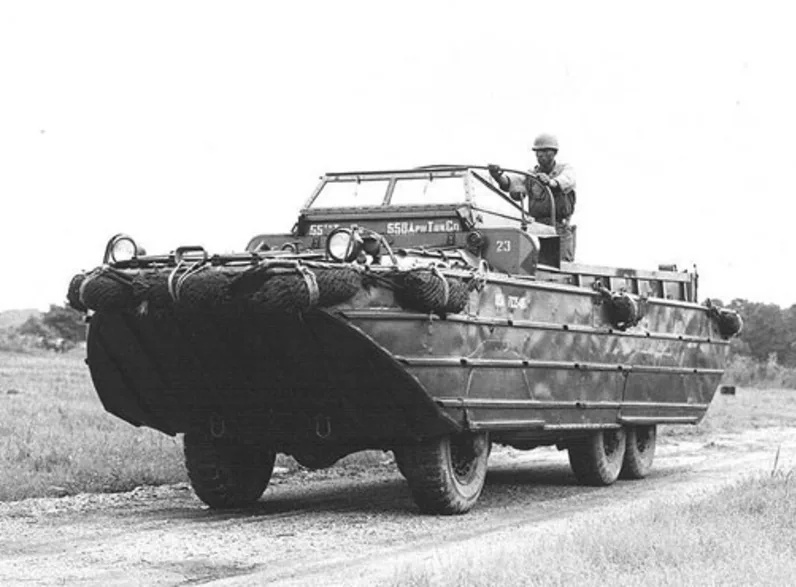
DUKW in American use in France

The CCW-353 (C for 1941 design, C for conventional cab, and W for tandem rear axles) was a near identical version of the CCKW-353, that lacked its front-wheel drive, resulting in an officially purely on-road, and therefore 5-ton rated, 6×4 version of the same truck. A beam front axle was used, with the transfer case locked in high range. Of the ~118,000 2 1/2-ton, 6x4 trucks the U.S. built in WW II, GMC contributed 23,649 units of the CCW-353 as standard cargo trucks without winch – almost all of them built in 1942.

=== DUKW ===
The DUKW (D for 1942 design, U for utility, K for all wheel drive, and W for tandem rear axles) — popularly the "Duck" – was an amphibious truck that shared the CCKW's driveline, but had a totally different body and structure than all the other trucks. First produced at Yellow's Pontiac plant, as demand increased production was added to Chevrolet's St. Louis plant. The hull, designed by an America's Cup winner, gave the truck respectable sea-keeping capability. A very successful design, 21,147 were built.

== Operators ==
- Australia
- Belgium
- Brazil
- Canada
- China, Republic of
- China, People's Republic of
- Czechoslovakia
- Denmark
- Finland
- France
- Greece
- India
- Indonesia
- Iran
- Israel
- Jordan
- Korea, Republic of
- Netherlands
- New Zealand
- Norway
- Philippines
- Poland
- South Africa
- Soviet Union
- Sweden
- Switzerland
- Turkey
- United Kingdom
- United States
- Yugoslavia

== Gallery ==
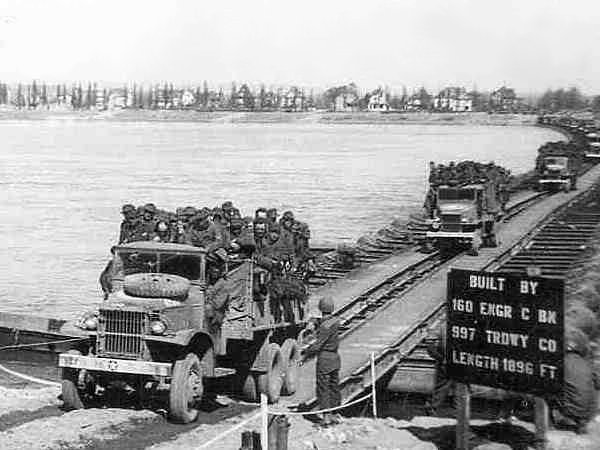
80th Division crossing the Rhine near Mainz

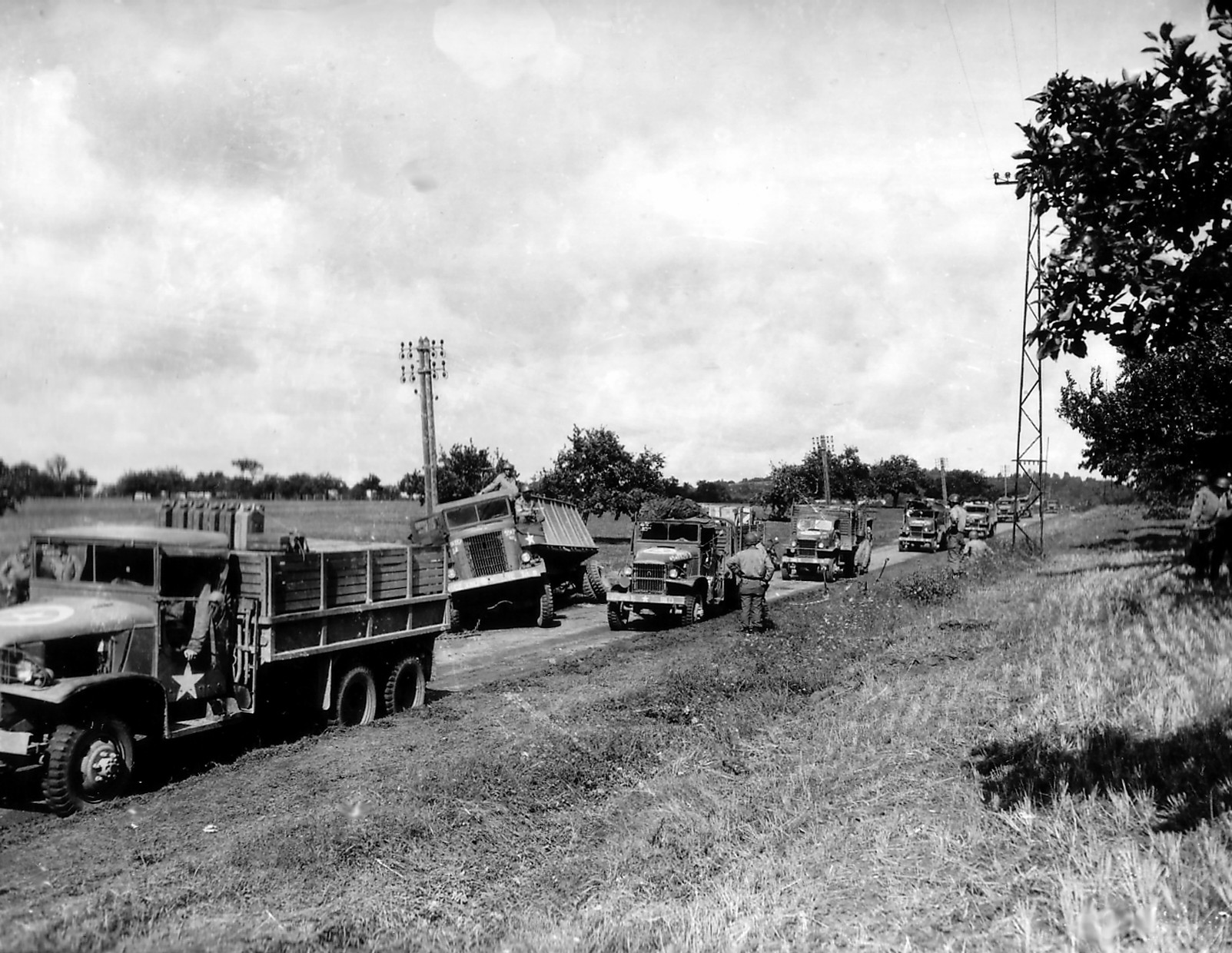
Red Ball Express convoy, 1944

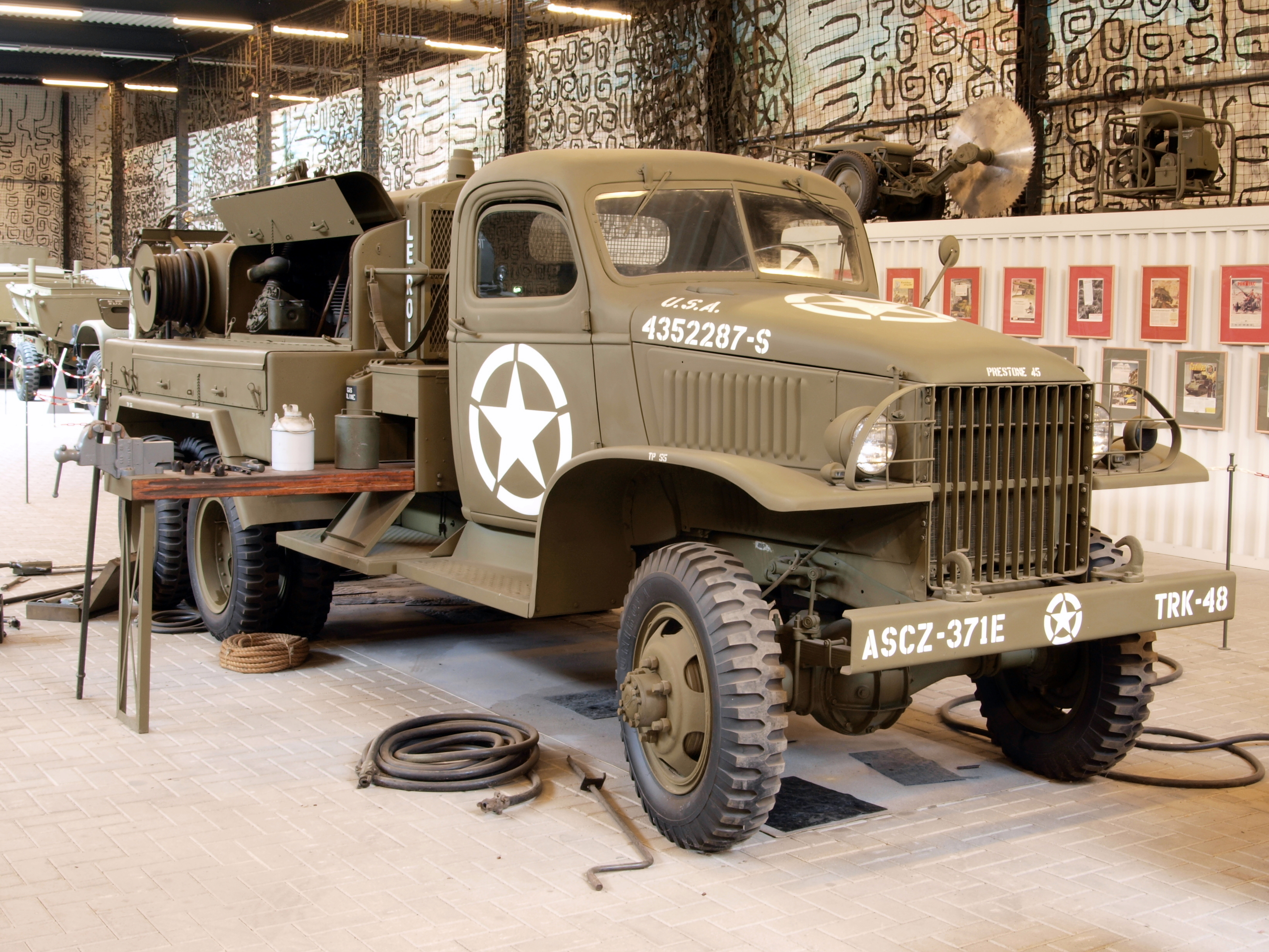
Restored maintenance vehicle

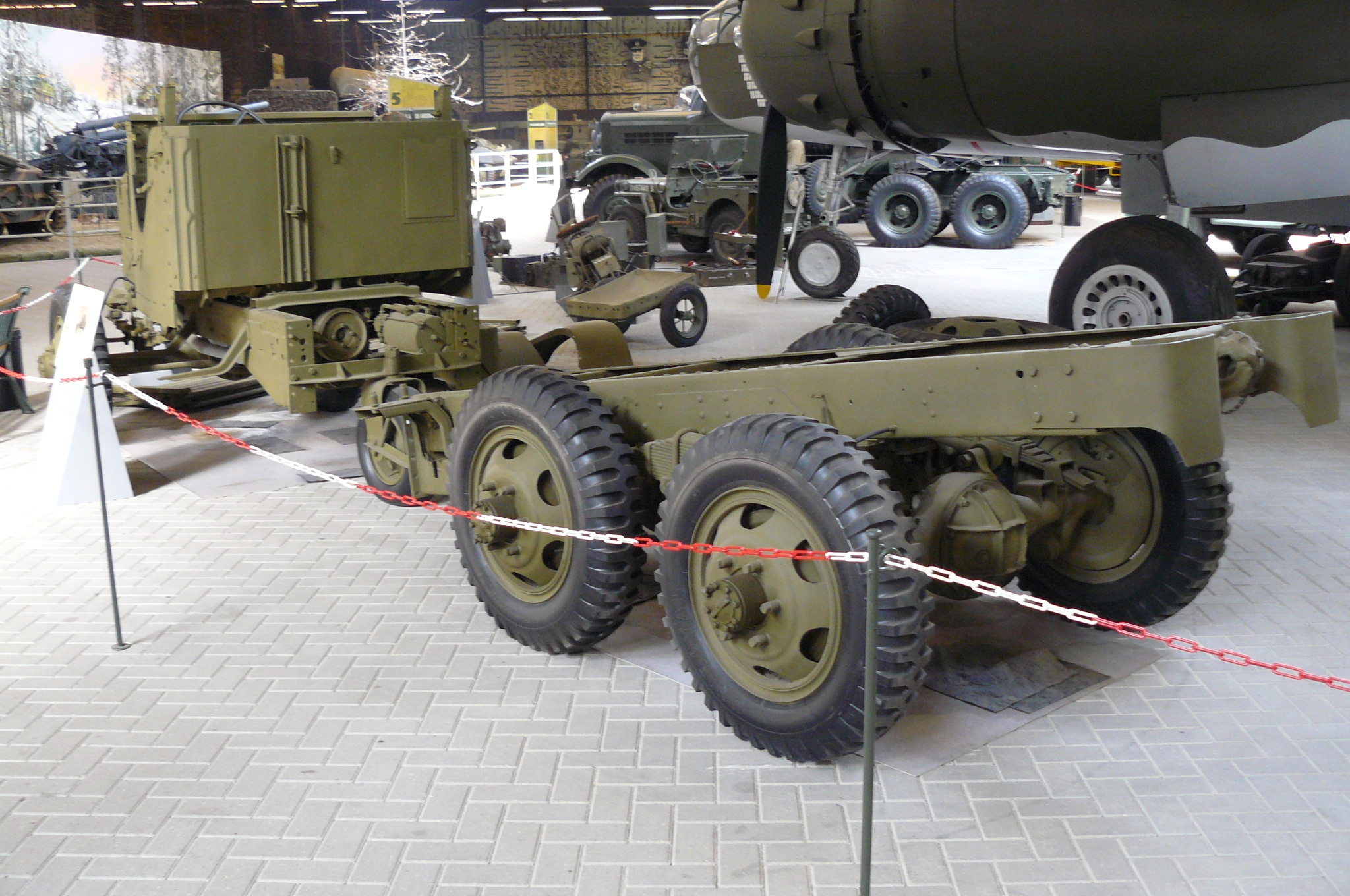
Restored two part chassis for air transport

== See also ==
- 2 1/2-ton, 6×6 truck (U.S. Army)
- DUKW 2 1/2-ton, 6x6, amphibious truck
- Chevrolet G506 1 1/2-ton, 4×4 truck
- M35 2 1/2 ton cargo truck
- Studebaker US6 2 1/2-ton 6×6 truck
- List of U.S. military vehicles by supply catalog designation / G-508
- List of U.S. military vehicles by model number
- List of U.S. Signal Corps Vehicles
- Red Ball Express

== Sources ==
- Boniface, Jean-Michel; Jeudy, Jean-Gabriel (1990). The GMC 6x6 & DUKW: A Universal Truck. Foulis/Haynes. ISBN 978-0-85429-860-0.
- Chief of Ordnance Office; Military Vehicle Preservation Association, eds. (2010). Summary Report of Acceptances, Tank-Automotive Materiel, 1940-1945 (Revision). Detroit: U.S. Army Service Forces, Office: Chief of Ordnance-Detroit, Production Division, Requirements and Progress Branch.
- Colley, David P. (2000). The Road to Victory: The Untold Story of World War II's Red Ball Express. Potomac Books. ISBN 1-57488-173-6.
- Crismon, Fred W (2001). US Military Wheeled Vehicles (3 ed.). Victory WWII Pub. ISBN 0-970056-71-0.
- Doyle, David (2003). Standard catalog of U.S. Military Vehicles. Krause Publications. ISBN 0-87349-508-X.
- Doyle, David (2010). 2 1/2-ton Truck. Squadron/Signal. ISBN 978-0-89747-609-6.
- Ware, Pat (2010). The World Encyclopedia of Military Vehicles. Lorenz Books. ISBN 978-0-7548-2052-9.
- Whitlock, Flint (2004). The Fighting First: The Untold Story of the Big Red One on D-Day. Westview. ISBN 0-8133-4218-X.
- TM 9-801 2 1/2-ton 6×6 GMC CCKW. US War Dept. 1944.
- TM 9-2800 Standard Military Motor Vehicles. US War Dept. 1943.
- TM 9-2800 Military Vehicles (PDF). US Dept. of the Army. 1947.
