= Mack model EH trucks =

American military truck

Mack model EH
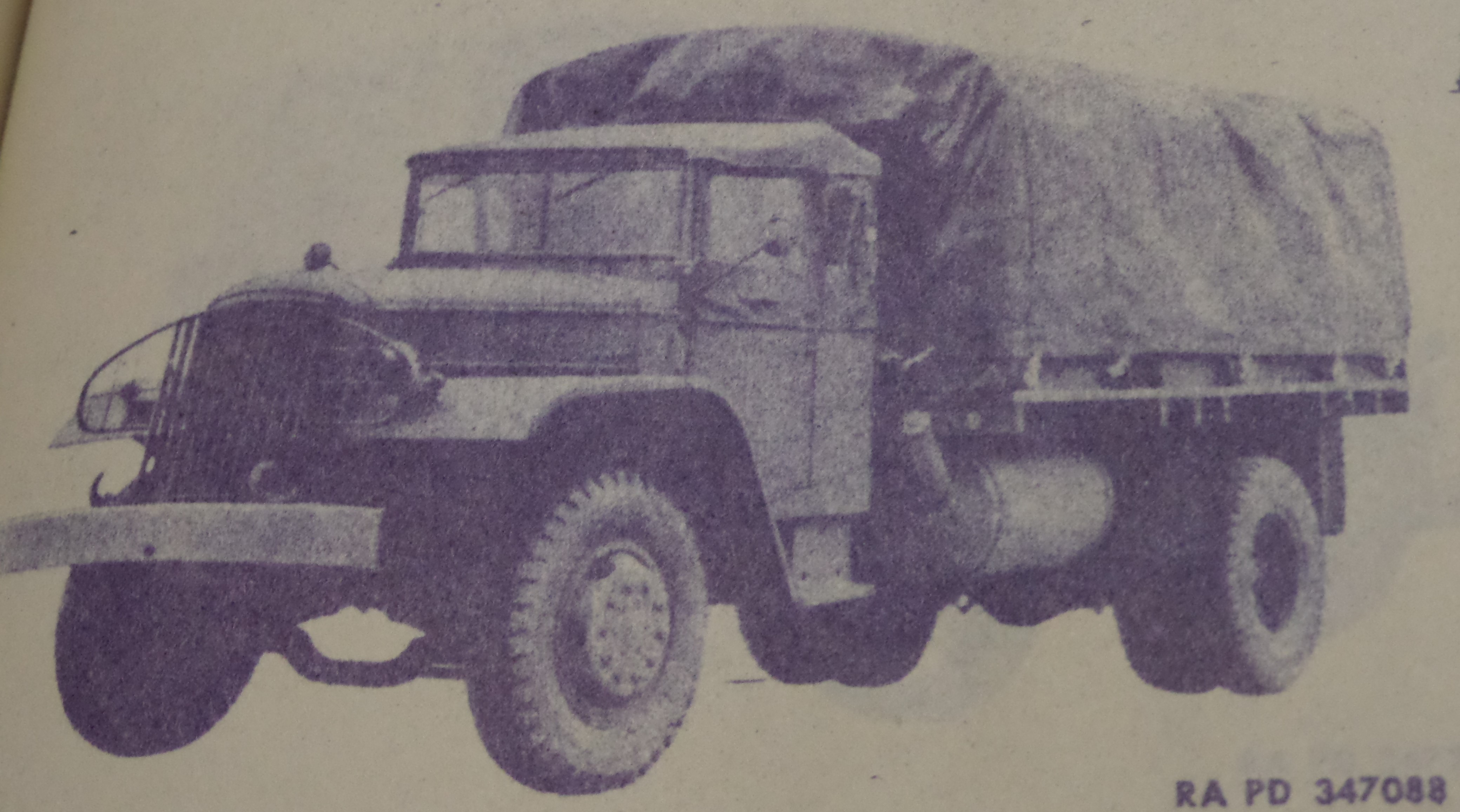
- Mack EH military cargo truck
- Place of origin: United States

Production history
- Manufacturer: Mack Trucks
- Produced: from 1936
- No. built: 2,400+ for military service
- Variants: EHT semi-tractor, EHU, EHUT (COE models)

Specifications (EH)
- Mass: 10,500 lb (4,800 kg) (empty)
- Length: 22 ft 7 in (6.88 m)
- Width: 8 ft (2.44 m)
- Height: 9 ft 5 in (2.87 m) (to tarpaulin bows)
- Engine: Mack EN354; 100 hp (75 kW)
- Suspension: Beam axles on leaf springs
- Fuel capacity: 120 US gal (450 L)
- Operational range: 275 mi (442.6 km)
- Maximum speed: 35 mph (56 km/h)

The Mack model EH trucks were a family of 4x2 trucks used by the US and British military before and during World War II. They were built in conventional and cab-over-engine models and were used as both trucks and semi-tractors. Originally a commercial design, in 1943 a military version became standard.

== History ==
In 1937, the US armed forces bought Mack's commercial E series in small orders, the EH was the largest model. In 1942, large numbers of modified trucks were supplied under Lend-Lease to Britain and many could be seen carrying the L or H-numbers of the British War Department. They differed from the commercial type by lacking chrome trim and nameplates, and were fitted with a military style cargo body with canvas cover. They were painted olive drab all over. 510 EH, 70 EHU, 140 EHT with semi-trailers ST20, 180 EHUT with semi-trailers ST20 were delivered.

In 1943 a military design version of the EH type was destined mainly for Defense Aid. From the total of 3450 EH produced, 2400 were supplied to Britain.

After the war, the E series commercial production continued until 1950.

== Engine and driveline ==
The standard engine was the EN310 (Mack) 6 cylinder L-head petrol engine, a Buda Engine Co. 6DT389 diesel was available. Some modified EH and all military design trucks had an EN354 engine, a 354 cu in (5.8 L) L-head inline 6 cylinder gasoline engine developing 110 hp (82 kW) at 2800 rpm and 200 lbf⋅ft (271 N⋅m) of torque at 1150rpm. Some transmissions were direct in 4th and overdrive in 5th gear, while others were direct in 5th. The rear axle was a double-reduction full-floating “banjo” type.

== Chassis ==
The EH had a ladder frame with two beam axles on leaf springs. The military models had two wheelbases, the 146 inches (3.71 m) short for tractors and the 170 inches (4.32 m) long for straight trucks. The variant EHUS had a shorter wheelbase at 132 inches (3.35 m). They were used as fuel servicing trucks in the US Navy or as wreckers for the USMC. The bus chassis had a 230 inches (5.84 m) wheelbase.

Commercial types had split-rim wheels and hydraulic brakes, military types had disk-type wheels and air brakes. The tires were 9.00x20.

== Models ==
There were four basic models. The EH was a conventional straight truck chassis, EHT was a conventional semi-tractor. The EHU was a C.O.E. straight truck chassis, and the EHUT was a C.O.E. semi-tractor. A C.O.E. can have a longer body, but the engine is harder to work on.

Besides the cargo and semi-tractor, there were fuel and water tankers, van bodies, wreckers, bus chassis, and fire trucks.
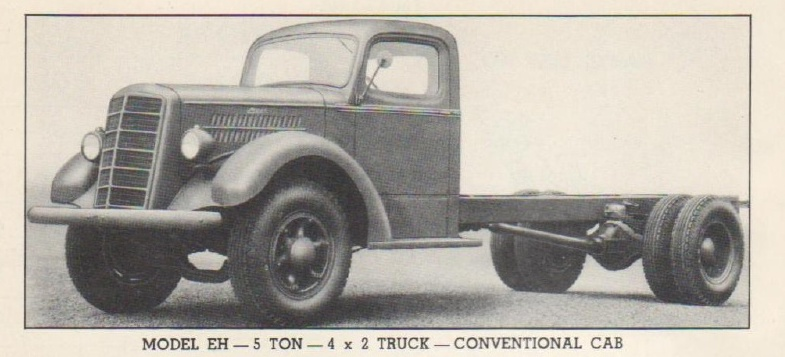
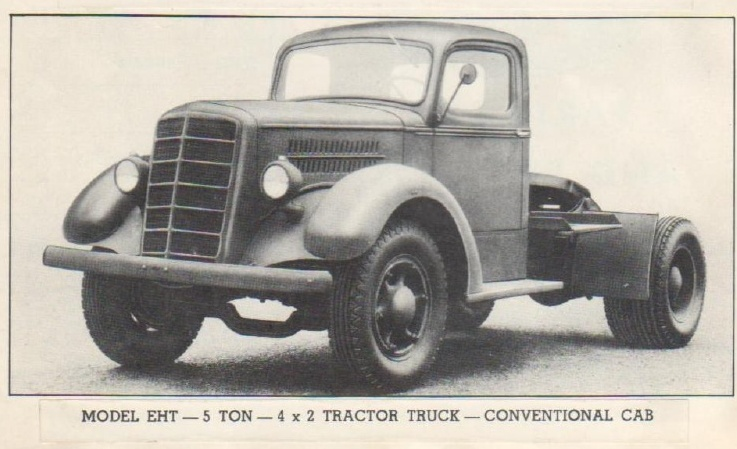
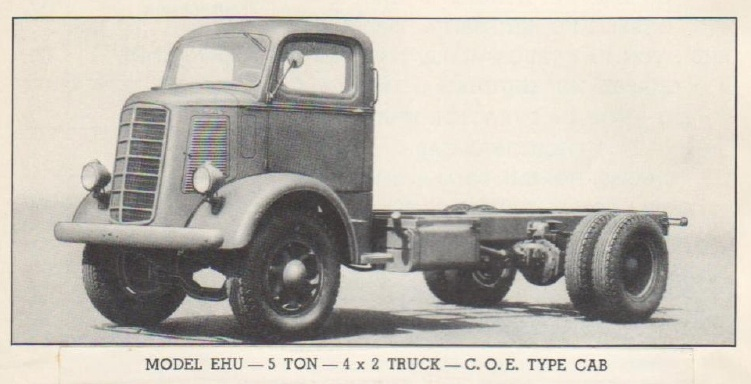
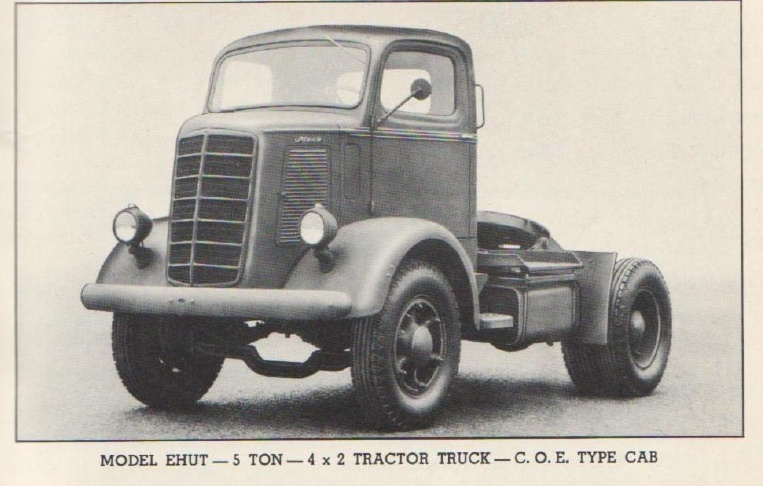

== See also ==
- Mack Trucks
- Mack M123 and M125
- Mack NJU
- Mack NM
- Mack NO
- Mack NR
