= Mack NM 6-ton 6x6 truck =

Mack NM
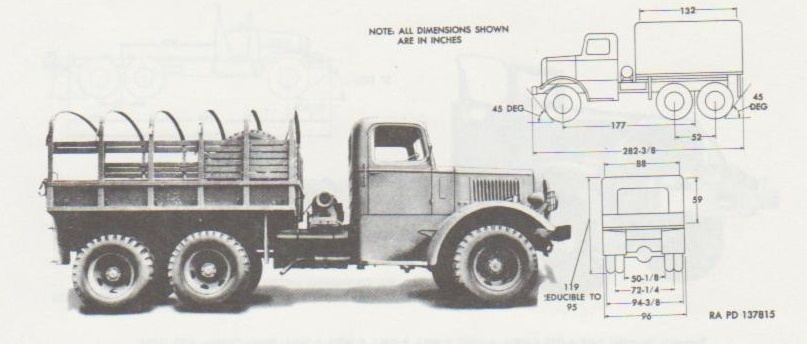
- Place of origin: United States

Service history
- Used by: United States; United Kingdom; Canada
- Wars: Second World War

Production history
- Designer: Mack Trucks
- Designed: 1939
- Manufacturer: Mack Trucks
- Produced: 1940–1945

Specifications
- Mass: 22,659 lb (10.278 t) empty
- Length: 23 ft 7 in (7.19 m); Canadian 10-tonner – 25 ft 7 in (7.80 m)
- Width: 8 ft (2.4 m)
- Engine: Mack EY; 707 cu in (11.59 L) IL6 petrol: 159 hp (119 kW) at 2100 RPM; 534 lb⋅ft (724 N⋅m) torque at 800 RPM
- Drive: 6x6
- Transmission: 5F1R x 2 speed transfer case
- Suspension: Live beam axles on leaf springs
- Fuel capacity: 80 US gal (300 L)
- Operational range: 280 mi (450 km) loaded
- Maximum speed: 34 mph (55 km/h)
- References: Standard catalog of U.S. Military Vehicles, Canadian Army Overseas Vehicle Data Book and The observer's fighting vehicles directory, World War II

The Mack NM 6-ton 6x6 truck, officially "Prime Mover Cargo truck (G-535)", was Mack's first military 6x6. It debuted as a prime mover in 1940, and was used for towing AA guns, and ammunition. Gun crews rode in its canvas covered bed. The NM's enclosed cab came from the commercial L-model. Many NM's were used by the British as recovery vehicles.

== Technical data ==
Overall Dimensions:
* 23 feet 4 inches (7.11 m) long
* 8 feet (2.44 m) wide
* 9 feet 11 inches (3.02 m) tall
Weight: 21,750 lb (9,870 kg)
Engine: Mack EY 707 cu in (11.6 L) ohv inline 6 cyl. gasoline engine with 170 hp (130 kW) at 2100.
Gearbox: Mack TR36 5-speed direct-top
Transfer Case: Timken-Detroit 2-speed T77 with 2.55 low
Wheelbase: 14 feet 9 inches (4.50 m)
Tires 9.75-22 (NM-1, -2, -3 Lee commercial with highway tread)

== Models ==
The NM-1 and NM-2 had an amidships mounted winch with a capstan head. It had a short steel cargo body 11 feet (3.35 m) long and 7 feet 4 inches (2.24 m) wide. The cargo body had troop seats, a canvas cover, and a spare wheel on the front right side. NM-2 had smaller head lamps and parking lamps on top.

The NM-3 was the last model to have an enclosed cab. It was similar to the NM-1 and NM-2 except for: front pintle for positioning artillery pieces, arched bumper (front pintle under the arche), smaller brush guard, side lights on mudguards, towing hooks on bumper deleted, radiator shell with Mack nameplate.

There was no NM-4, the prototype NN-2 did not go into production.

The NM-5 and NM-6 had a soft top cab with folding windscreen. It had a wooden cargo body with two spare tires at the front right and left. They had some technical detail changes. The only differences between the NM-5 and NM-6 were rifle brackets in the cab and jerrycan holders left of the winch for the NM-6.

NM-7 and NM-8 were like the NM-5 and NM-6. There were only minor detail modifications. Some were equipped with the gun-carriage brake cylinder: this was an air-cylinder from Hanna for the simultaneous actuation (cable operated) of the air brakes of the truck and the mechanical brakes of the gun.

== Service ==
The Mack NM served in the United States Army during the Second World War as an artillery tractor towing heavy artillery pieces such as the 155 mm gun M1 and 8-inch howitzer M1 alongside the Mack NO.

The Mack NM also served in the British Army in the Second World War, including as tractors for 50/60 pontoon bridge transporting and launching trailers. In 1944 a Mack NM-6 was converted into a prototype heavy wrecker by the British Army, featuring 6-ton Holmes twin booms, a 7-ton winch developed by the British for the Diamond T tank transporter and earth spades capable of holding for a 10-ton pull. In Match 1945 an order was placed for 500 examples, but was cancelled with the end of the War.

In Canadian Army service, Mack NMs with lengthened bodies and no winch were used as 10-ton load carriers. Standard Mack NMs also served in the Canadian Army in a number of roles including towing radars in Heavy Anti-aircraft artillery Regiments, and in Royal Canadian Army Service Corps service towing laundry trailers and in armoured formations in lieu of 10-ton NMs.

== Gallery ==
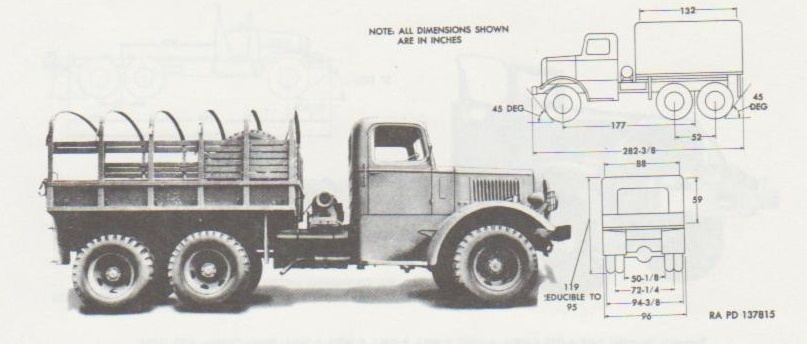
Mack NM-2

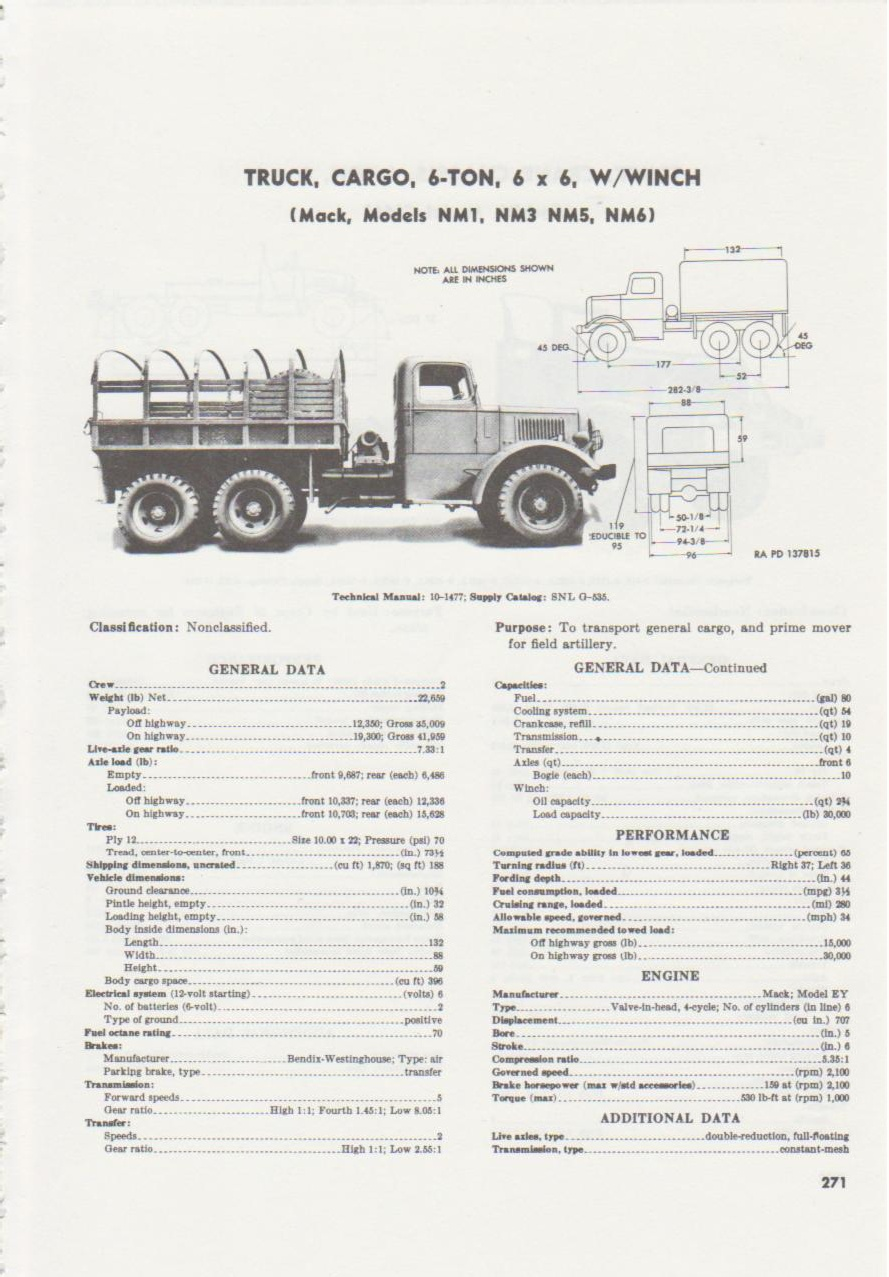
Mack specifications

== See also ==
- Mack trucks
- Mack EH
- Mack M123 and M125
- Mack NR
