= M123 and M125 10-ton 6x6 trucks =

M123 and M125 10-ton 6x6 truck
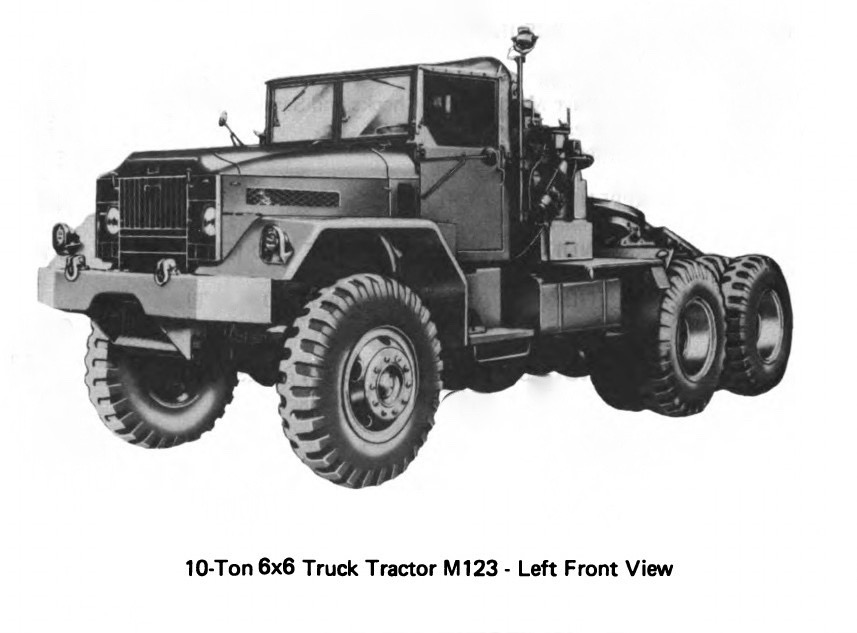
- M123 Semi-tractor
- Type: 10-ton 6x6 trucks
- Place of origin: United States

Production history
- Designer: Mack
- Manufacturer: Mack, CONDEC
- Produced: 1955–1969
- No. built: 3580 (+552 M125)

Specifications (M123)
- Mass: 32,490 lb (14,740 kg) empty
- Length: 23 feet 4 inches (7.11 m)
- Width: 9 feet 6 inches (2.90 m)
- Height: 9 feet 3 inches (2.82 m)
- Engine: Le Roi TH-844 (for other see text); 297 hp (221 kW)
- Transmission: 5 speed x 2 range
- Suspension: Beam axles on leaf springs
- Operational range: 300 mi (482.8 km)
- Maximum speed: 42 mph (68 km/h)

The Mack M123 (G792) was a 10-ton 6x6 semi-tractor introduced in 1955. The Mack M125 was a heavy cargo truck version of the M123. The M123 was used to tow tank transporter trailers while the M125 towed field artillery pieces.

== History ==
In 1949 the US Army set a requirement for a family of extra heavy-duty 10‑ton (9,072 kg) load rated, off-road, 6x6 tactical trucks. Mack's design, influenced by their WWII era NO (7 1/2-ton, 6x6 truck), was chosen. Designed as an entire family of trucks, only the semi-tractor and cargo/prime mover were built. 392 M123 were built between 1955 and 1957 and 552 M125 were built between 1957 and 1958.

In 1965 CONDEC began building 3188 diesel powered M123A, Mack began building 420 in 1968. In 1969 Mack then upgraded 210 gas engine models to diesel power.

With the Army using more self‑propelled artillery, the need for prime movers was reduced, no follow‑up orders for M125 were made.

Both M123 and M125 saw service in the Vietnam War. M123 tractors remained in Army service into the 1990s.

In addition to the US Army, the M123 was used by the U.S. Marine Corps and exported to U.S. allies in such countries as Australia and Spain.

== Specifications ==
=== Engine and driveline ===
All M123 and M125 built in the 1950s had a LeRoi T‑H844 engine, an 844 cu in (13.8 L) overhead valve V8 gasoline engine developing 297 hp (221 kW) at 2600 rpm and 725 lbf⋅ft (983 N⋅m) of torque at 1700 rpm. The M123A1 built in the 1960s had a Cummins V8‑300, a 785 cu in (12.9 L) naturally aspirated V8 diesel engine developing 300 hp (220 kW) at 3000 rpm and 580 lbf⋅ft (786 N⋅m) torque at 2100 rpm. This engine was also retrofitted into M123 to make M123E2. Only one M125 was converted to a diesel as a prototype, it is now being restored.

The drivetrain was a repeat of that in the Mack NO, with a Mack TRDXT72 5 speed transmission with the transfer case mounted solidly to the rear of the transmission. This transmission was direct in 5th. The transfer case had a 2.50:1 low range, engaged the front axle, and had a power take-off to operate the winch(es).

The front axle was an unusual triple reduction type which did not need universal joints on the outer ends and allowed a tighter turning radius. The two rear axles were a double reduction type. Final drive ratios were 9.02:1 for gas powered trucks and 10.11:1 for diesels. The driveline for every M123 and M125 was built by Mack, regardless of who manufactured the rest of the truck.

=== Chassis ===
A ladder frame chassis type was used. The front beam axle was mounted on leaf springs, the rear tandem beam axles were mounted on a leaf sprung "walking beam" type suspension. All models shared a 181 inches (4.60 m) wheelbase (measured from the 1st to the 3rd axles). Full air drum brakes were used. The M123 was able to control the trailer brakes independently of the tractor. The M125 had electrical connections for the artillery piece brakes. In both models, the tire size was 14.00x24.

The main differences between various chassis was the location of the 45,000 lb (20,000 kg) winches and fifth-wheels. Different M123 models had either one or two winches mounted behind the cab, all M125 had a single winch at the front.

The M15A2 was the trailer that the M123 was intended to tow. It had a higher load plate and larger coupling pin than a standard semi-trailer. Early M123 had a larger fifth wheel mounted above the frame rails, but as more standard trailers were used, the M123C and all following models had lowered fifth wheels. The pin remained larger, so any trailer towed by any M123 had to have an interchangeable pin.

A standardized REO designed cab, also used in the 2 1/2 and 5‑ton trucks, was used. It had hinged doors with roll-up windows, a folding windshield, and a removable canvas roof. A hard roof could be fitted. With the same cabs and similarly designed fenders and hoods, the main visual difference between these three models was the size of the vehicle and the scale of the cab to the vehicle.

== Models ==
=== M123 ===
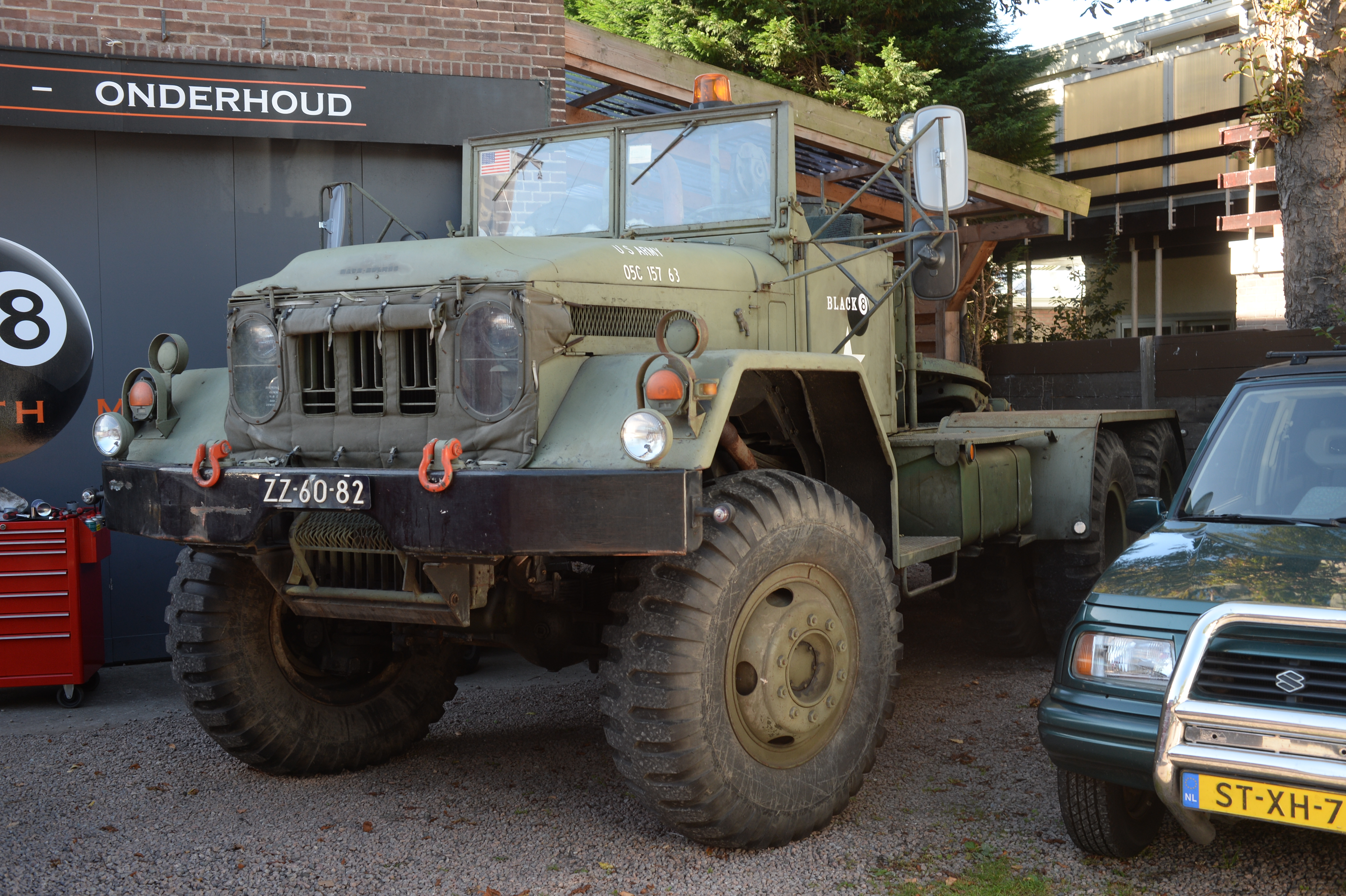
1963 Mack M123A1C

The M123 was used to tow semi-trailers carrying MBTs (in conjunction with the M15A1 and later the M747 semi-trailers) superseding the M26(A1) Pacific "Dragon Wagon" and the semi-trailers carrying engineering equipment (in conjunction with the M127 low bed semi-trailers).

Variants:

- M123 had dual winches and high mounted fifth wheel, gasoline engine
- M123C had a single mid-ship winch and low mounted fifth wheel, gasoline engine
- M123D had dual mid-ship winches and low mounted fifth wheel, gasoline engine
- M123A1 had a single rear winch and a V‑8 diesel engine (300 hp (224 kW)).
- M123A1C, built from 1965 to 1969 by CONDEC, had a diesel engine and single rear winch
- M123E1 were M123s that were upgraded with the diesel engine.
- M123E2 with dual rear winches, diesel engine

=== M125 ===
The M125 succeeded the Mack NO as a heavy cargo transport vehicle; it also served as a prime mover towing the 155‑mm gun and 8‑in. howitzer. The chassis was designated M121. It had a 14 ft (4.27 m) steel cargo body with folding troop seats, bows and canvas cover. A single front-mounted Garwood DSA716 45,000 lb (20,000 kg) capacity winch was fitted, and a chain hoist at rear for handling ammunition.

== Gallery ==
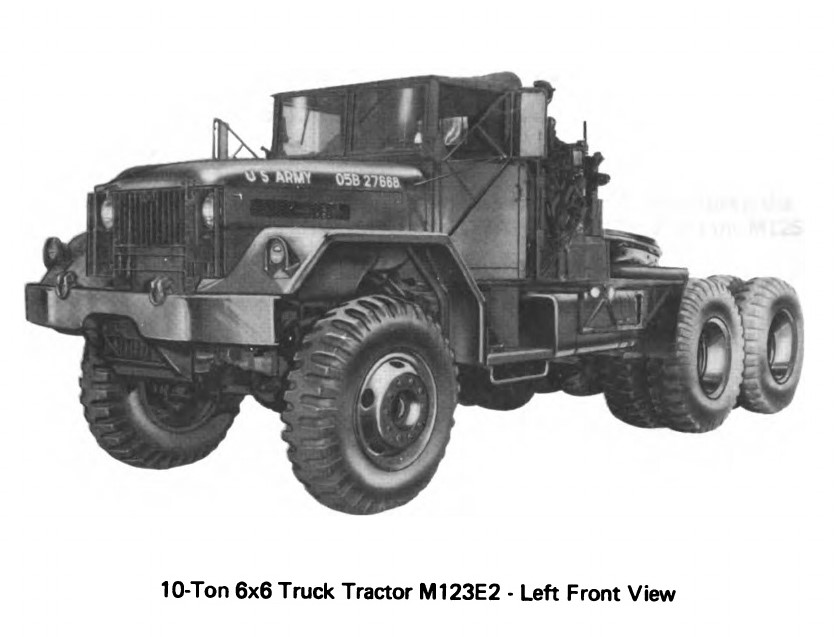
M123E2

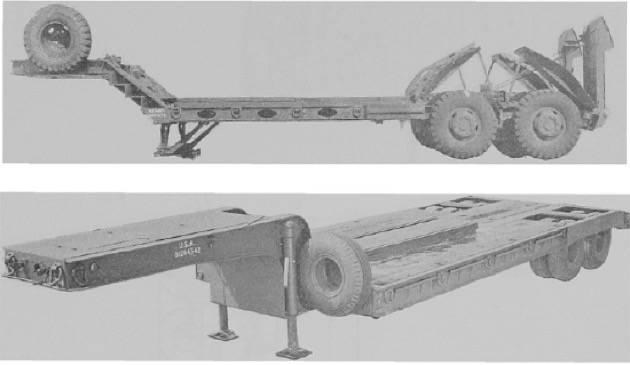
M15A2 (top) M172 (bottom)

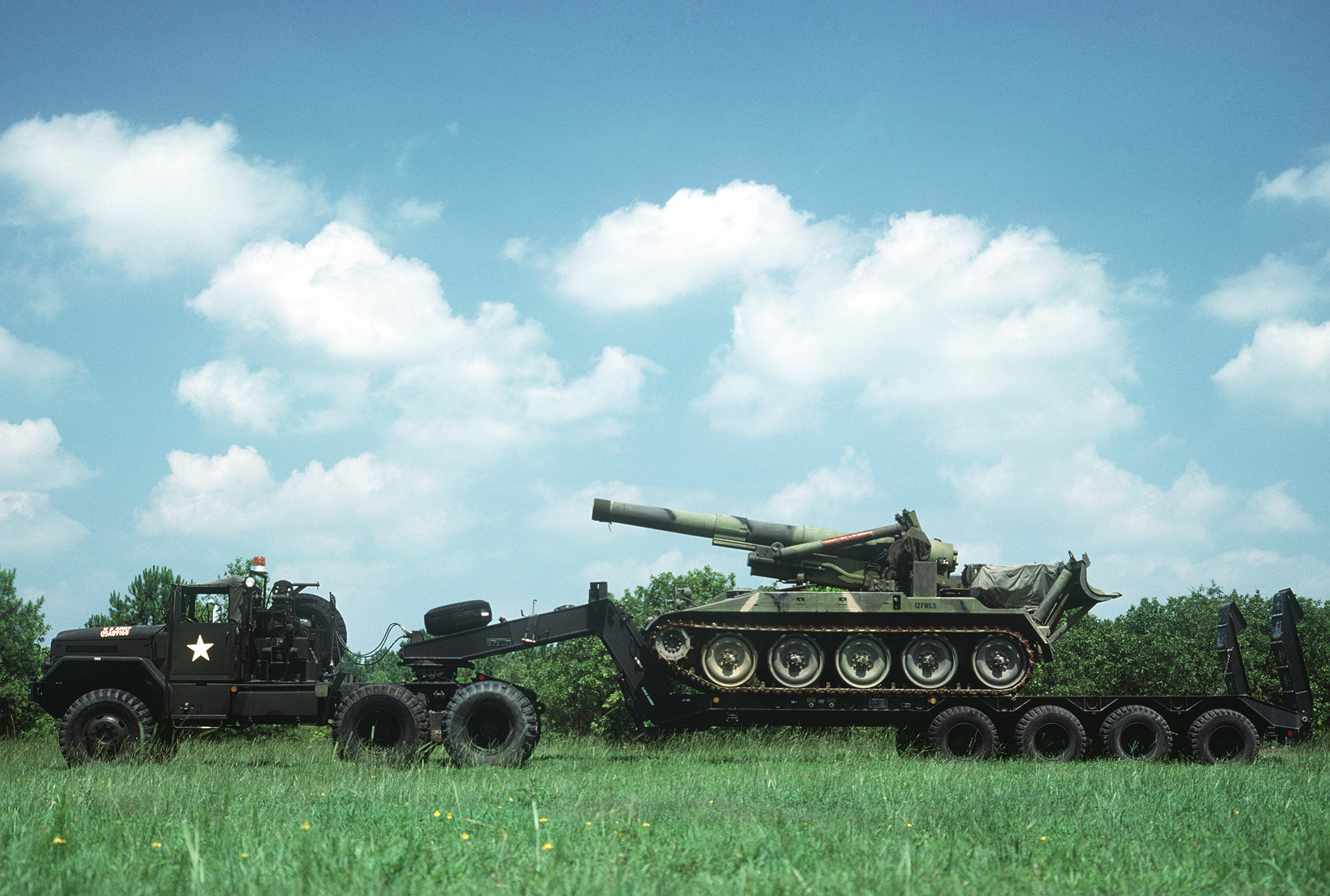
M123 towing M747 trailer with M110 203 mm self-propelled howitzer

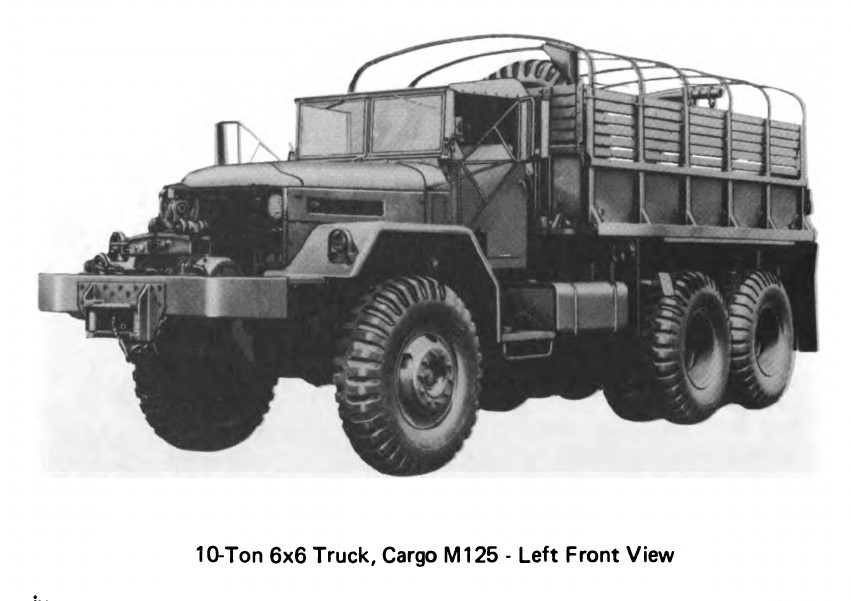
M125

== See also ==
- List of U.S. military vehicles by model number
- List of supply catalog G-numbers
- Mack EH
- Mack NM Truck, 6-Ton, 6x6, Cargo
- Mack Trucks
