= Mack NR =

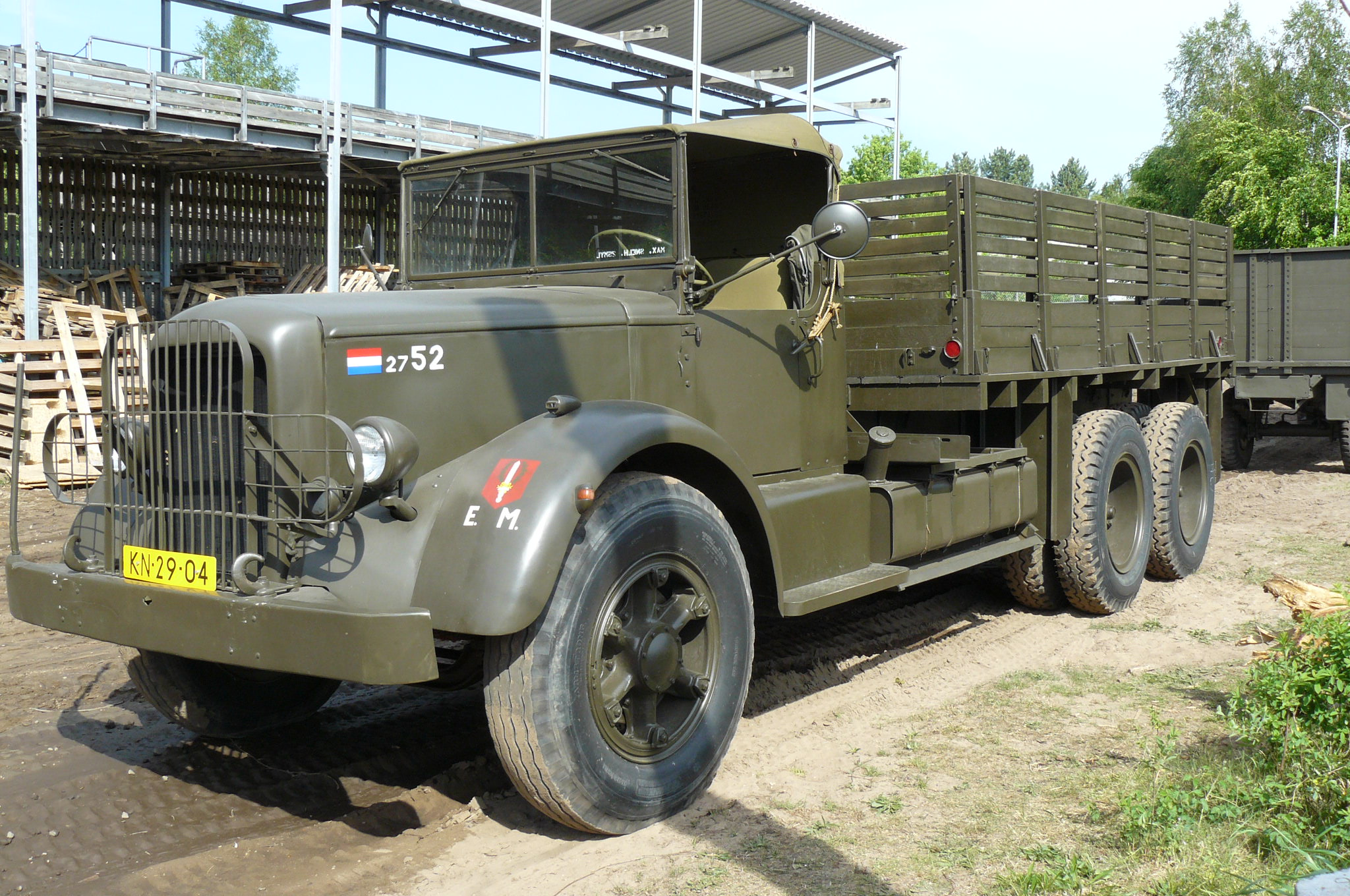
- Mack NR truck; Bridgehead, Bussum, Netherlands
- Type: Cargo truck
- Place of origin: United States

Production history
- No. built: over 16,000 built

Specifications
- Mass: 9.2 ton (empty)
- Length: 8,200 mm (322.8 in)
- Width: 2,600 mm (102.4 in)
- Height: 2,500 mm (98.4 in)
- Crew: 1 driver
- Armor: none
- Secondary armament: none
- Engine: Mack-Lanova ED diesel engine, 6-cylinders 131 hp
- Payload capacity: 10 ton (cargo capacity)
- Suspension: wheels, 6x6

The Mack NR was a heavy 6x4 cargo truck designed and produced in the 1940s by the American manufacturer Mack Trucks. It was used mainly by the British Army to transport cargo and materiel over long distances during World War II. The official U.S. Army designation was: Truck, 10 ton, 6x4, Cargo. Its G-number was (G-528).

== History ==
Before the outbreak of World War II France had bought in United States 210 Mack EXBX heavy trucks as 4,800 US gallons (18,000 L; 4,000 imp gal) tankers. The outcome of the Battle of France prevented the delivery of these trucks to France, and Great Britain received them instead and used them for transporting tanks. The British Purchasing Commission acting in the United States contracted the provision of Mack heavy trucks for military use; this resulted in the NR series. Every order was given its own number even if the performance remained unchanged or the differences were minimal; this resulted in the NR-1 to NR-20 designations.

=== NR-1 to NR-7 ===
In 1940 an initial order was placed with Mack for 90 heavy trucks in the 10-ton category under the designation NR-1. These trucks were similar to those provided to the British troops through the French order, but were not specifically equipped for tank transport. The NR-1 was a variant of a basic civilian version that was marketed in the 1930s by Mack; however with a solid grill to protect the radiator and headlamps, and an extra roof above the cab to prevent overheating. These vehicles were assigned to the Middle East and the Far East theatres. The trucks were powered by a six-cylinder Mack-Lanova ED engine which could deliver 131 HP at 2,000 rpm; driving a TR 12 Duplex transmission with five gears. The rear wheels, with tyre size 13.50-20, were the only with power, hence the 6x4 designation; the front wheels had a different tire size, namely 10.50-24. The empty weight was just over 10 tons. The cost per vehicle was around $9,000.

The initial order was quickly followed by two follow-up orders, for the NR-2 and NR-3 models. The NR-2 was a military version of the Model 270 driver's cab and it differed in small details; this cab was used until the introduction of the open cabin. The British ordered 330 units of this model. In 1941 61 units of the NR-3 model were ordered; this was meant for long-distance transport in the Middle East by the logistics department of the British Army, the Royal Army Service Corps (RASC). The dimensions were 8.2 meters long, 2.6 meters wide and 2.5 meters high. The empty weight was 9.3 tons, and this version had a slightly different wheel size (11.00-24 front and 14.00-20 rear).

The NR-4 variant was like the Mack EXBX, a special version for tank transport. On August 21, 1941, an order was placed for 200 units. They were identical to the NR-3 but with a flat-floor cargo area, a winch, and ramps to upload the tank to the cargo area. The empty weight was about 11.7 metric tons, and the total weight load was less than 22.7 tons. The vehicle was designed to transport the M3 Stuart light tank, which weighed almost 13 tons, but could also be used for transporting the Cruiser Mk II A10, and Valentine tank.

The NR-5 variant had a Duplex TRD 37 gearbox, but was otherwise identical to the NR-3.

=== Introduction of the open driver's cab ===
In NR-8, a new cab was introduced. The full metal cab was replaced with an open cabin that could be covered with a canvas roof.

The NR-9 to NR-13 variants were very similar to the NR-8. In the NR-14, produced in 1944, the rear wheels were dual (wheel size 11.00-24). Many copies of the NR-15 were shipped to Iran and played a key role in the transport of war materials to the Soviet Union via the Persian Corridor The two fuel tanks had a capacity of 280 liters (75 US-gallon) and were mounted on either side of the vehicle.

The NR-16 was in fact the last order placed during the war; 455 units were delivered in 1945. The order for the NR-17 was canceled at the end of World War II. After the war, the Americans ordered 600 units for the European armies then being re-established; Belgium and Netherlands each received 150 vehicles (NR-18 and NR-19) and France received 300 units (NR-20).

In total, 16 548 examples of the NR series were produced, and due to their good quality most remained in service until well after the war.

== Description ==
The vehicle had a typical configuration, with a hooded front engine behind which there was a large driver cabin, and a rear cargo area.

== Variants ==
In total, 16 548 vehicles were built, in 20 variants as described in the following table.

Type	Model	Number Built	Years Produced
Cargo transport (civil cabin)	NR-1	90	1940
Cargo transport (Model 270 cabin)	NR-2	330	1941
Cargo transport	NR-3	61	1941 to 1942
Tank transporter	NR-4	200	1941 to 1942
Cargo transport	NR-5	189	1941 to 1942
Cargo transport	NR-6	500	1942
Cargo transport	NR-7	500	1942 to 1943
Cargo transport	NR-8	700 (150 + 550)	1942 to 1943
Cargo transport	NR-9	900	1943 to 1944
Cargo transport	NR-10	1,257	1943 to 1944
Cargo transport	NR-11	239	1943 to 1944
Cargo transport	NR-12	1,320	1943 to 1944
Cargo transport	NR-13	1,280	1943 to 1944
Cargo transport (open cab, twin rear wheels)	NR-14	7,080	1944 to 1945
Cargo transport	NR-15	847	1945
Cargo transport	NR-16	445	1945
Cargo transport	NR-17	none	order cancelled
Cargo transport (Belgium)	NR-18	150	Post-war
Cargo transport (Netherlands)	NR-19	150	Post-war
Cargo transport (France)	NR-20	300	Post-war

== See also ==
- List of U.S. military vehicles by supply catalog designation (G-528)
- List of U.S. military vehicles by model number
- Mack Trucks
- Mack model EH trucks
- Mack NJU
- Mack NM
- Mack NO
- White-Ruxtall 922
