= Dodge T-Rex =

Concept car developed by Dodge

Overview
- Manufacturer: Dodge (Chrysler)
- Model years: 1997

Body and chassis
- Class: Concept vehicle

Powertrain
- Engine: 8.0 L (488 cu in) 20-valve 90° Magnum V-10
- Transmission: Chrysler 47RE

The Dodge T-Rex was a Ram-based concept vehicle produced by Dodge in 1997 with three axles and six-wheel drive.

It was powered by the 8.0-liter Magnum V10 engine, borrowed from the production 1990s era Ram 2500/3500 V-10. The heavy-duty Ram engine made 300 horsepower and 450-pound feet of torque. Power was never officially rated for the T-Rex, although dodgeram.org suggested more than stock.

Daimler AG (then known as Daimler-Benz AG which would merge with Chrysler in 1998 to form DaimlerChrysler) later produced a 6X6 version of the G63 AMG SUV/truck.

A version of the T-Rex was featured as an unlockable vehicle in the 2001 driving game Test Drive: Off-Road Wide Open, as well as the PS1 game Test Drive Off Road 3.
