= Six-wheel drive =

Type of drivetrain with all six wheels driven

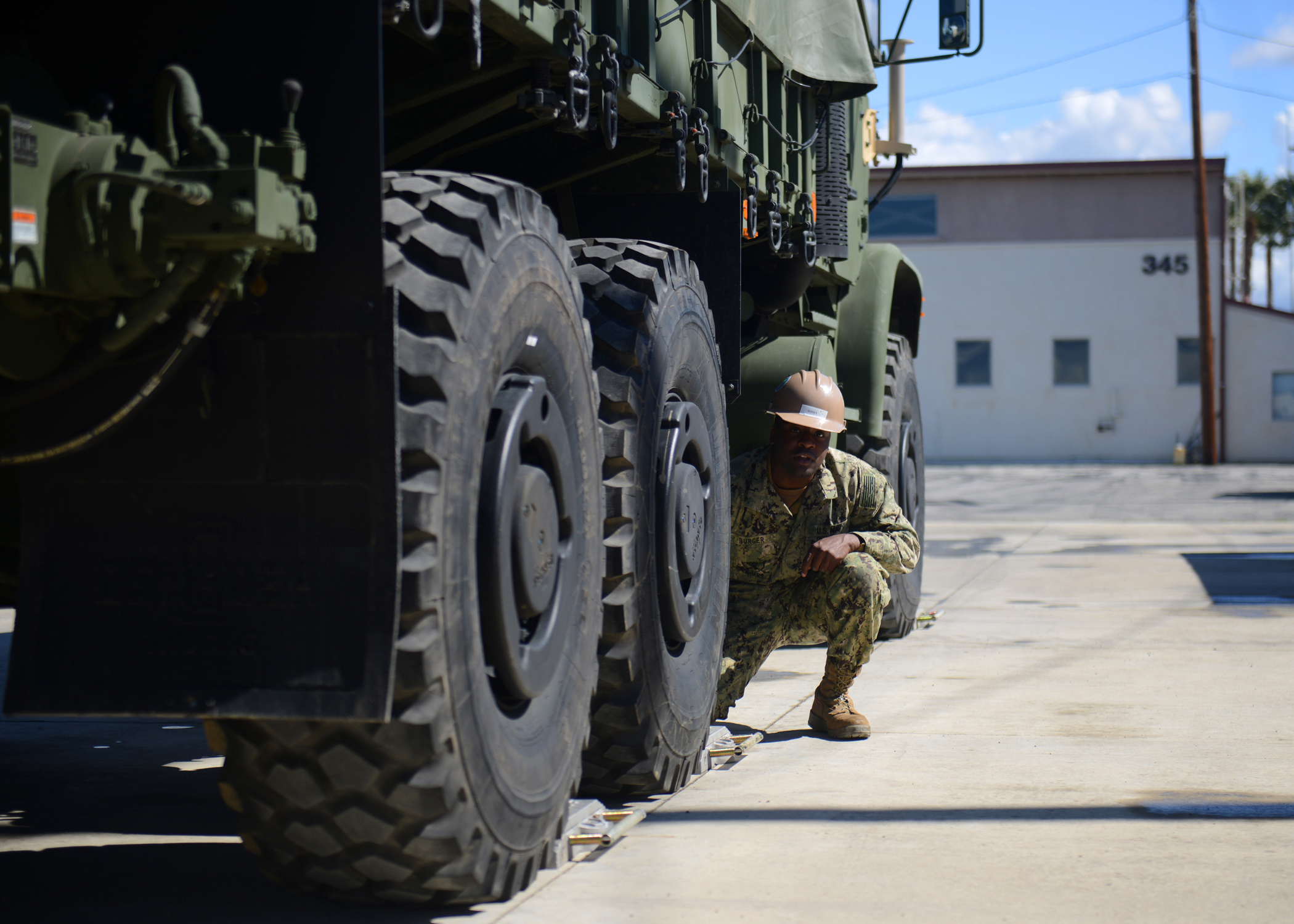
A United States Navy Oshkosh MTVR, a six-wheel drive military truck with full-time all-wheel drive and super-single tires on all axles

Six-wheel drive (6WD or 6×6) is an all-wheel drive drivetrain configuration of three axles with at least two wheels on each axle capable of being driven simultaneously by the vehicle's engine. Unlike four-wheel drive drivetrains, the configuration is largely confined to heavy-duty off-road and military vehicles, such as all-terrain vehicles, armored vehicles, and prime movers.

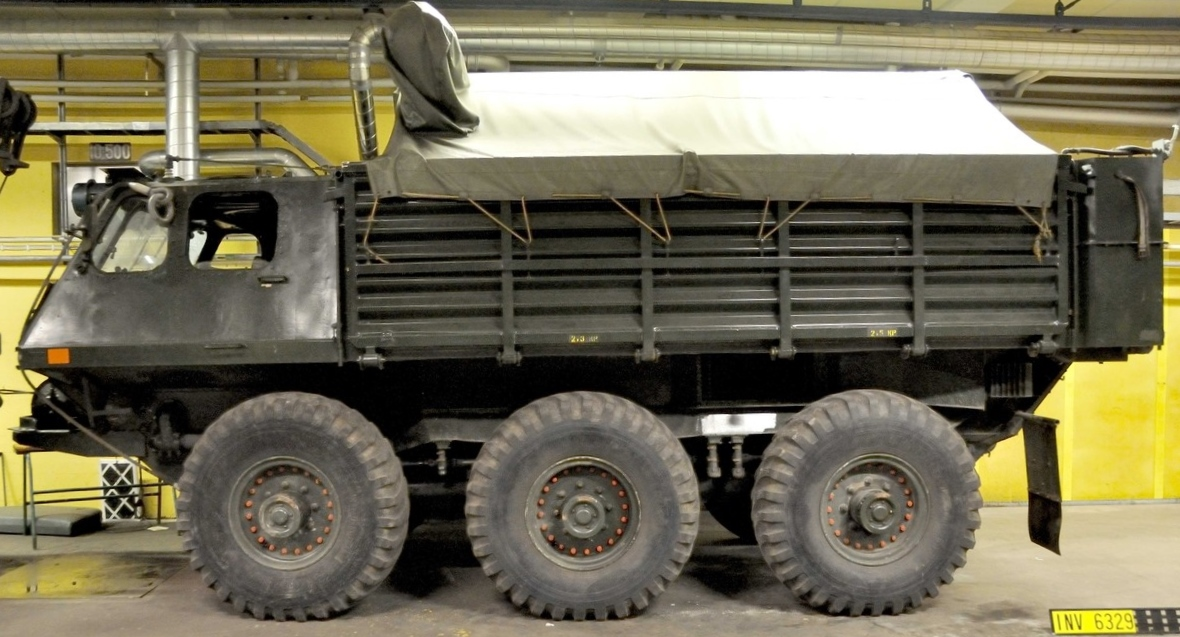
6-wheel British-manufactured military Alvis Stalwart 6×6 with three evenly spaced axles and full-time 6x6 H-drive

When such a vehicle only has six wheels by definition all are driven. When it has ten—with two pairs of ganged "dual" wheels on each rear axle as on a GMC CCKW—all are also driven but the 6×6 designation remains. For most military applications where traction and mobility are considered more important than payload capability, single wheels on each axle (often referred to as super singles) are the norm.

Heavy hauler and ballast tractor 6×6s have had a long history as prime movers both in the military (as tank transports and artillery tractors), and commercially in logging and heavy equipment hauling both on- and off-road.

Most six-wheel drive vehicles have a forward axle and two at the rear (with only the front pair steering), or three evenly spaced in varying steering configurations. Depending on the vehicle's role, the number of wheels varies between six (in three pairs) and ten (with two in the front and two dual axles with four wheels apiece in the rear). Drive may be limited to the rear two axles for on-road use.

== Examples ==
=== Military ===
- British Alvis FV600 series: Saladin, Saracen, Salamander and Stalwart
- Finland Sisu SA-240 & SA-241
- French Renault TRM 10000
- French ACMAT VLRA
- German Mercedes-Benz G300 CDI G-Class 6x6
- German MAN/RMMV SX44
- German MAN LX and FX
- German RMMV HX58, HX61 & HX42M
- Austrian Pinzgauer High Mobility All-Terrain Vehicle
- Italian Astra Veicoli Industriali tactical range SM66.40
- Poland Star 266
- Serbian FAP 2026
- U.S. M25 tank transporter
- U.S. Mack NO heavy cargo truck
- U.S. CCKW 2 1/2 ton medium cargo truck
- U.S. M35 2 1/2 ton medium cargo truck
- U.S. M561 Gama Goat
- U.S. M939 heavy cargo truck
- U.S. MTVR all-terrain cargo truck
- U.S. FMTV MTV
- U.S. M123/123A, M125/125A prime mover/heavy cargo truck
- Indian Ashok Leyland FAT 6×6 cargo truck

=== Military/commercial ===
- Canada Western Star Trucks
- Czech Tatra T815
- German Mercedes-Benz Actros
- German Mercedes-Benz Zetros
- Russian Ural-4320
- Russian ZIL-131
- Ukrainian KrAZ-255
- U.S. Oshkosh M911 (also produced as 8x6 with a liftable second axle)

=== Commercial ===
- Commercial 6×6 prime movers were made by Hayes Manufacturing and Pacific Trucks. which also produced heavy haul ballast tractors. The Freightliner Business Class M2 is a commercial medium-duty truck sold in the United States and available in a 6×6 configuration.

=== Conversions ===
- Six-by-six conversions of four-wheel drive trucks are made, such as the Australian Army's Perentie Land Rover Defender and "Landcruiser Sherman"), as are 6×4 versions (with only front and rear or front and middle axles driven).

=== Recreational ATV/UTV ===
- Polaris Industries has produced a number of six-wheel drive ATVs and UTVs for many years, based on a standard Magnum, Sportsman or Ranger with an extra axle and a cargo box over the rear wheels.

=== Concept cars ===
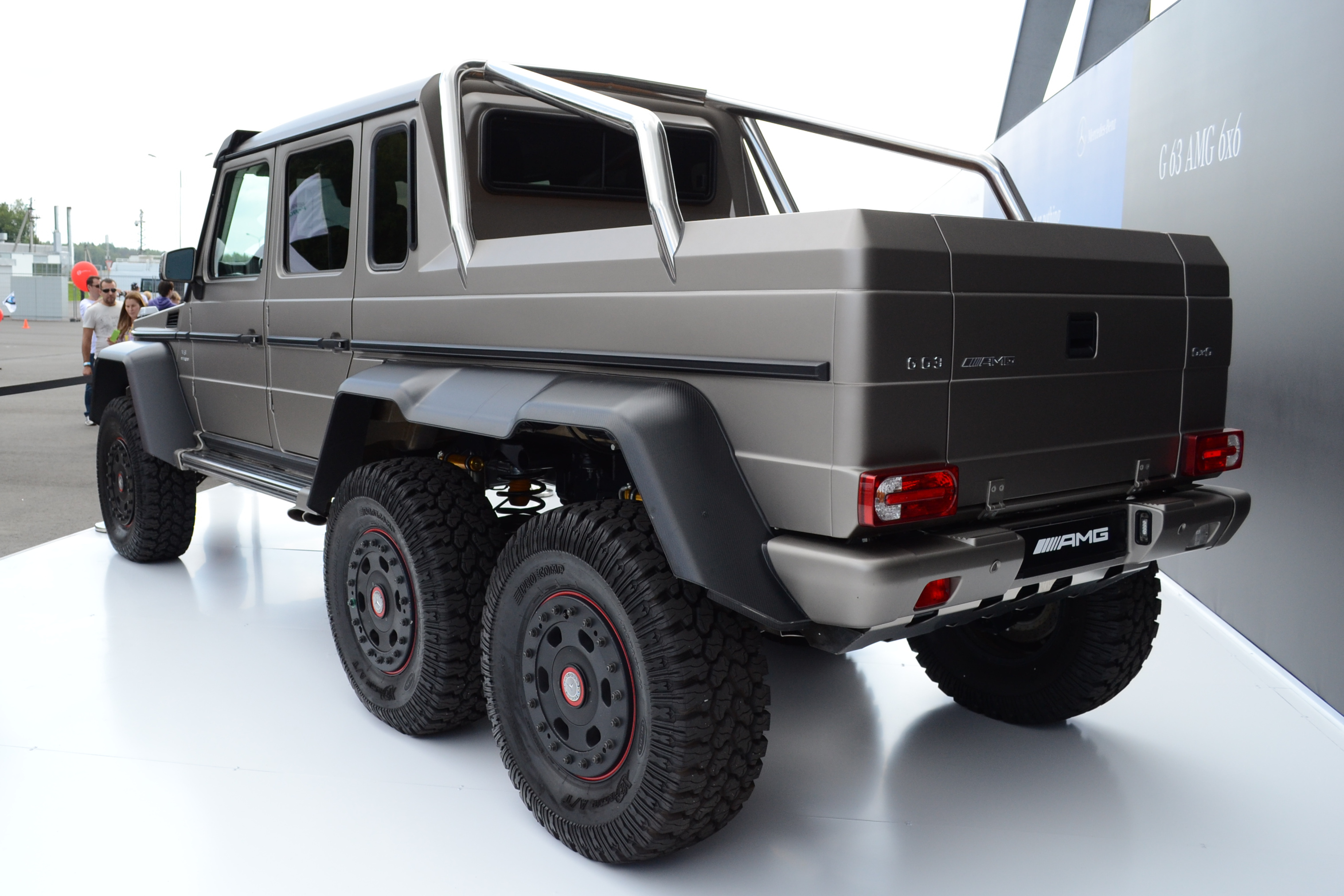
Mercedes-Benz G63 AMG 6x6 with twin rear axles

Concept car, testbed, and limited production commercial examples include:

- Hennessey Ford VelociRaptor 6×6, with a 30-inch extended frame and six driven wheels
- 6x6 Six Wheel Drive Jeep – Fully custom chassis, body and drive-line

=== Twin front axle ===
- Ford Seattle-ite XXI (concept car)

=== Twin rear axle ===
- Bogie-drive (Twin axle) 6x6 vehicles are built by 6x6 Australia Pty Ltd and have full load-sharing coil-spring rear suspension with full-time bogie-drive

(Twin axle) drive in the rear, and an integrated "roll steer" function built into the suspension design. All 6x6 Australia Pty Ltd vehicles are ADR-compliant with IPA for both "heavy" and "light" vehicles.

- Dodge T-Rex
- Mercedes-AMG G 63 6x6 4x4 plus two without load-share, meaning far less wheel articulation for off-road, needing five differential locks to operate

== Image gallery ==
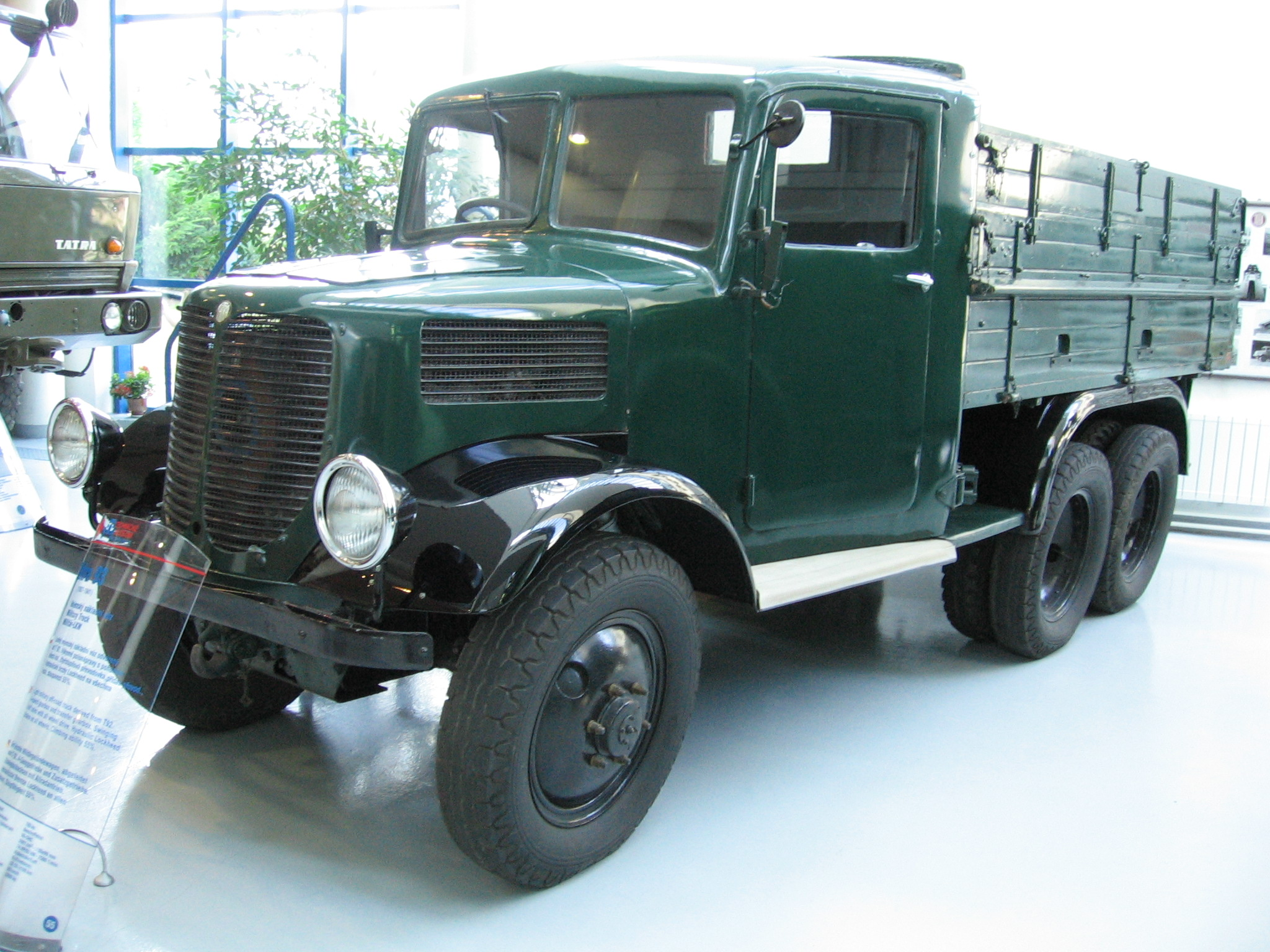
6x6 Tatra 93 (1938)

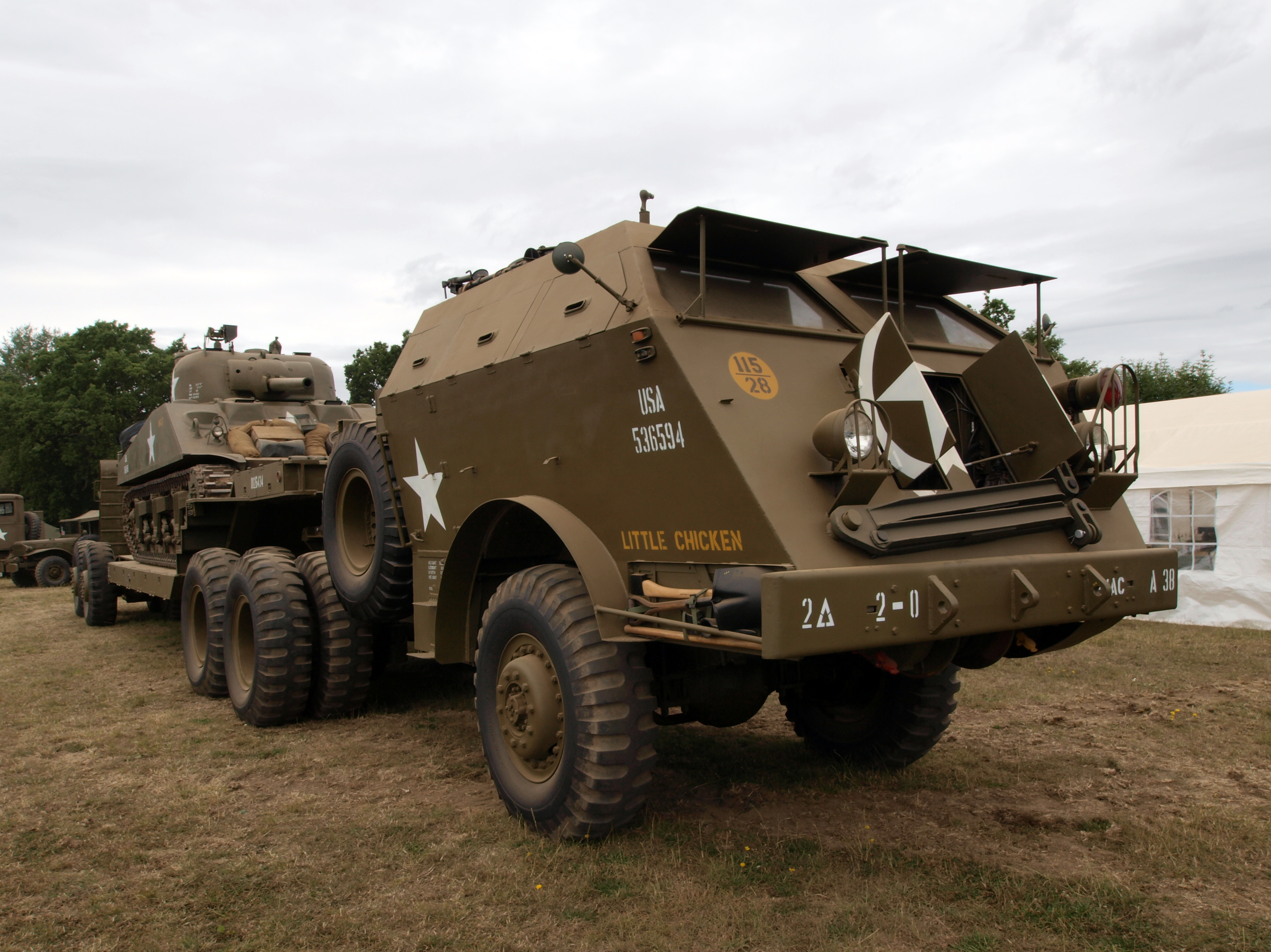
10-wheel U.S. Army 6×6 Pacific Car & Foundry Co.-built M26 armored tank transporter tractor unit

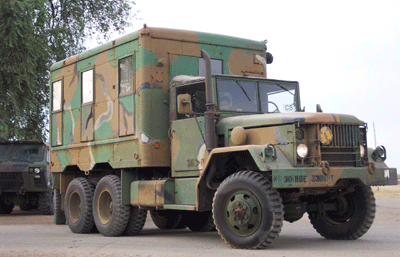
10-wheel U.S. Army 6×6 M35 2½ ton cargo truck, with one front and two rear axles

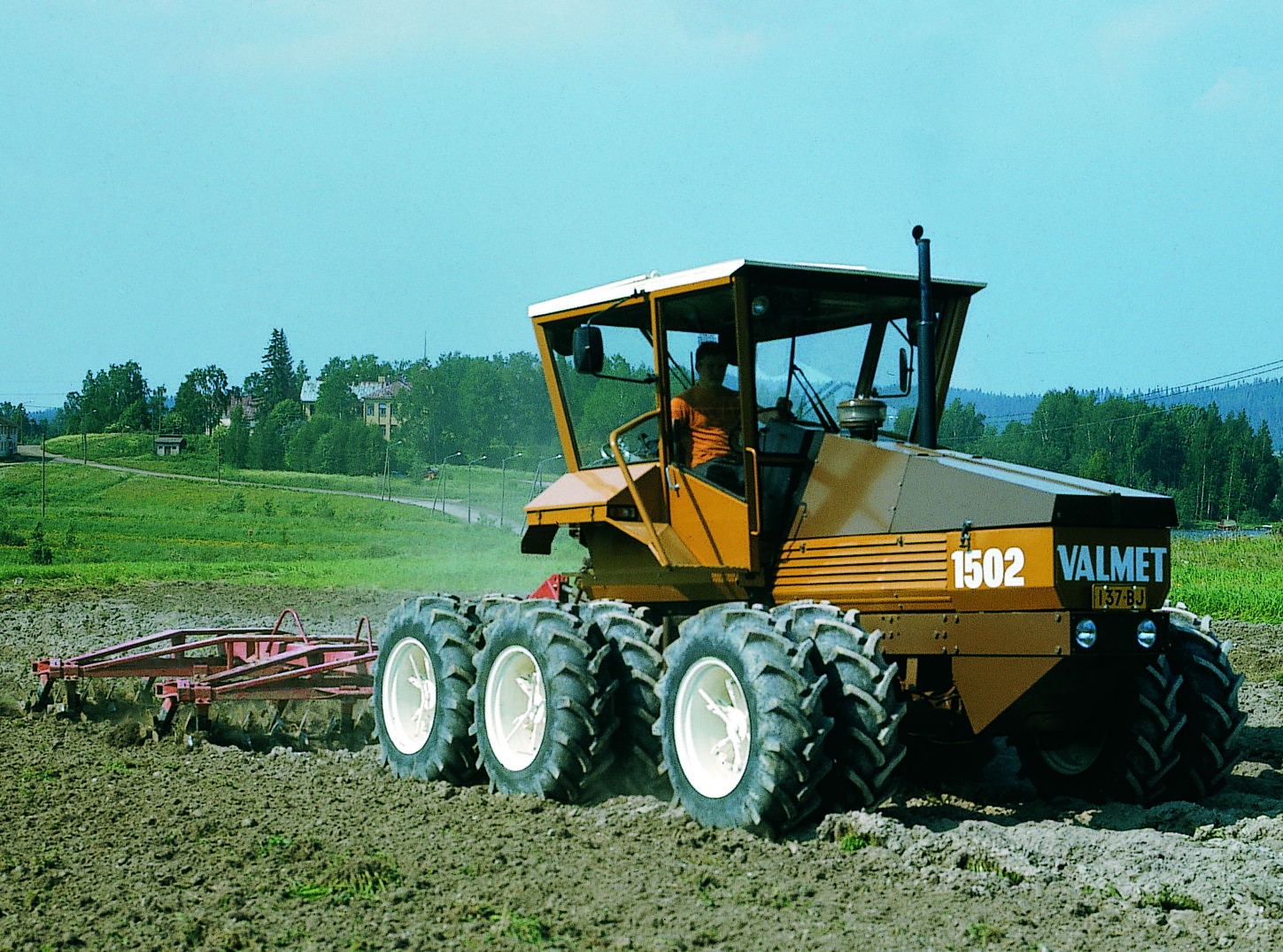
Six-wheeled Valmet 1502 tractor, with a bogie axle at the rear

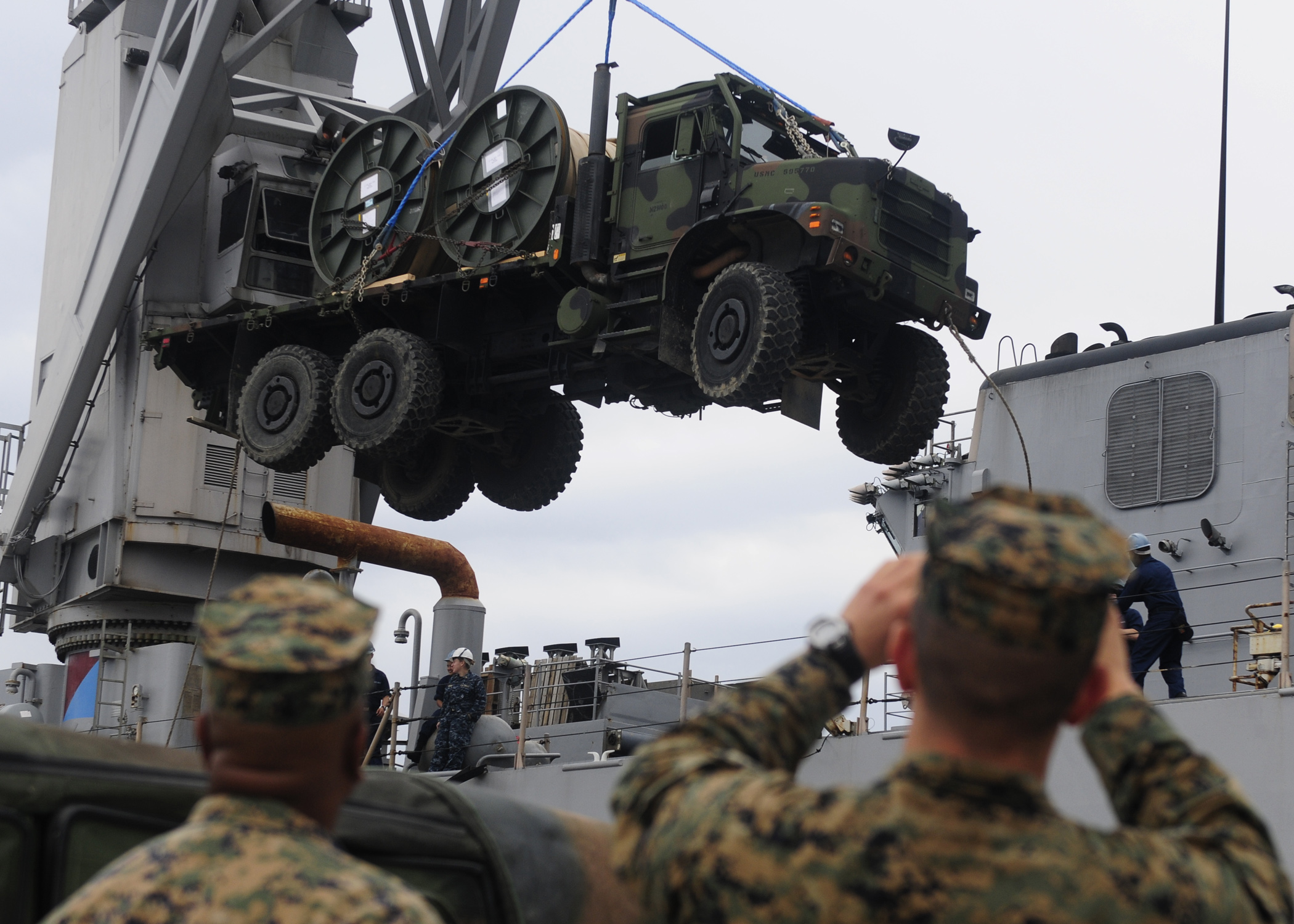
6-wheel U.S. Marines 6×6 MTVR, with one front and two rear axles

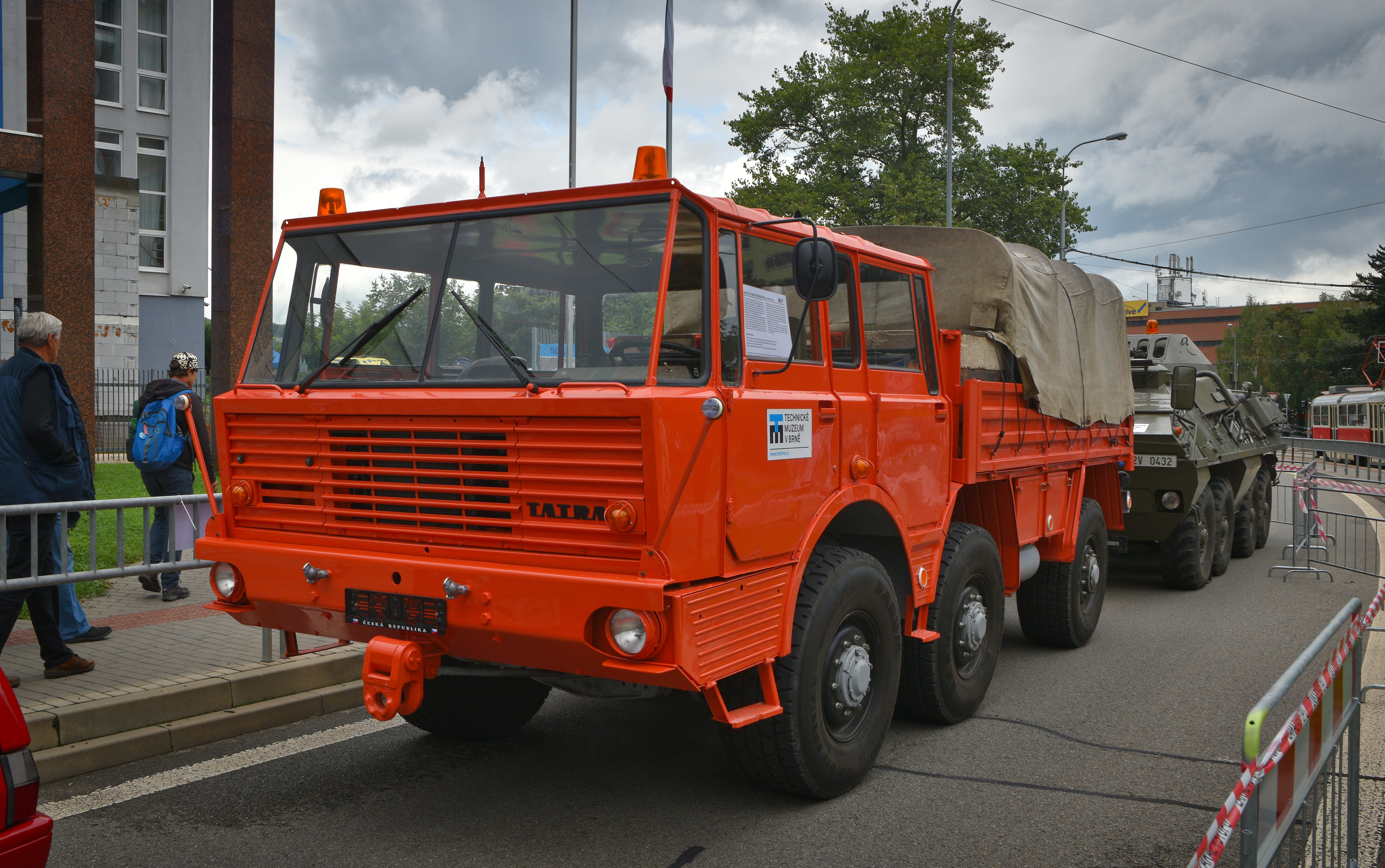
Unusual two forward and one rear axle configuration of the Czech Tatra 813

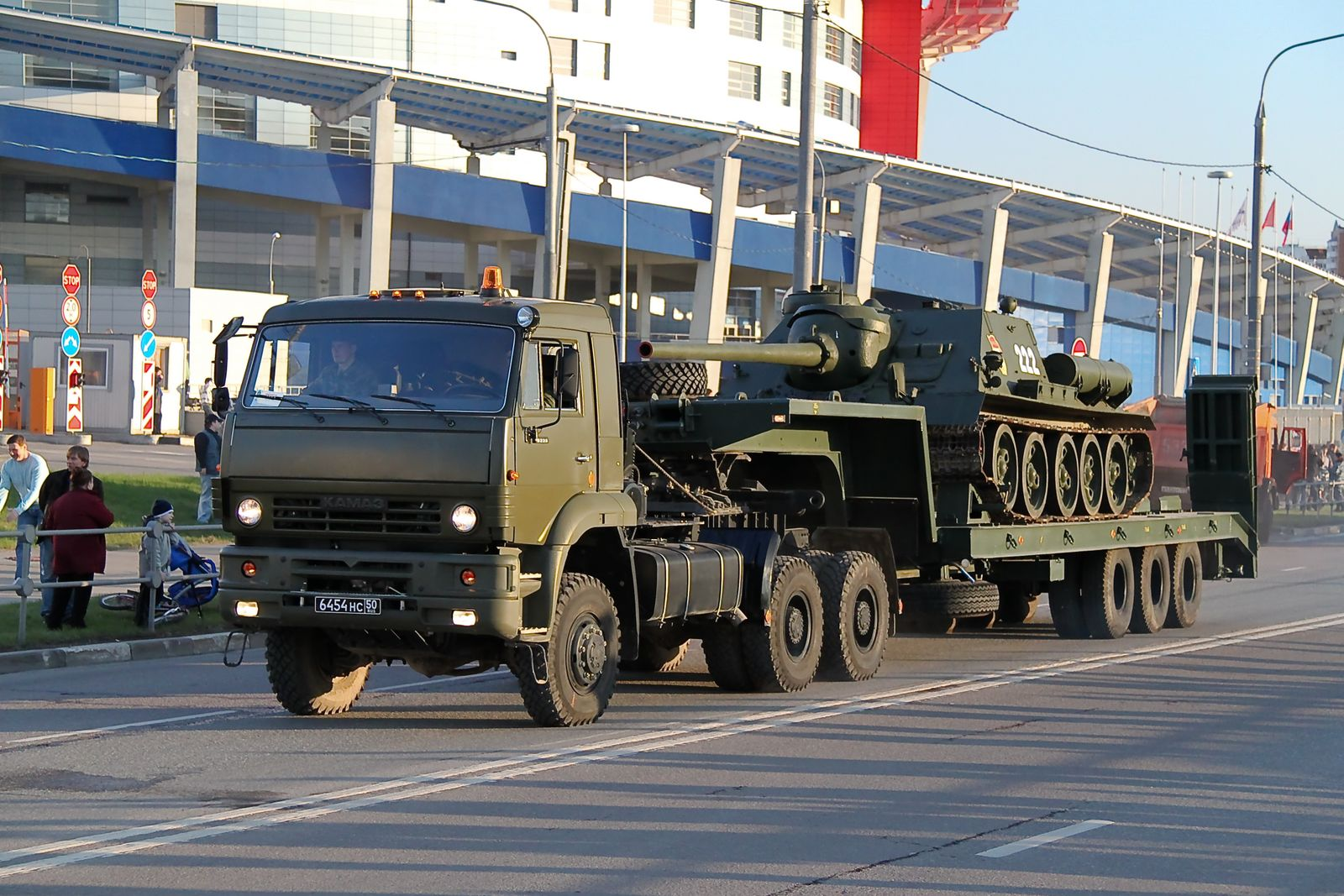
A Russian Army KamAZ military tank transporter carrying an SU-85M

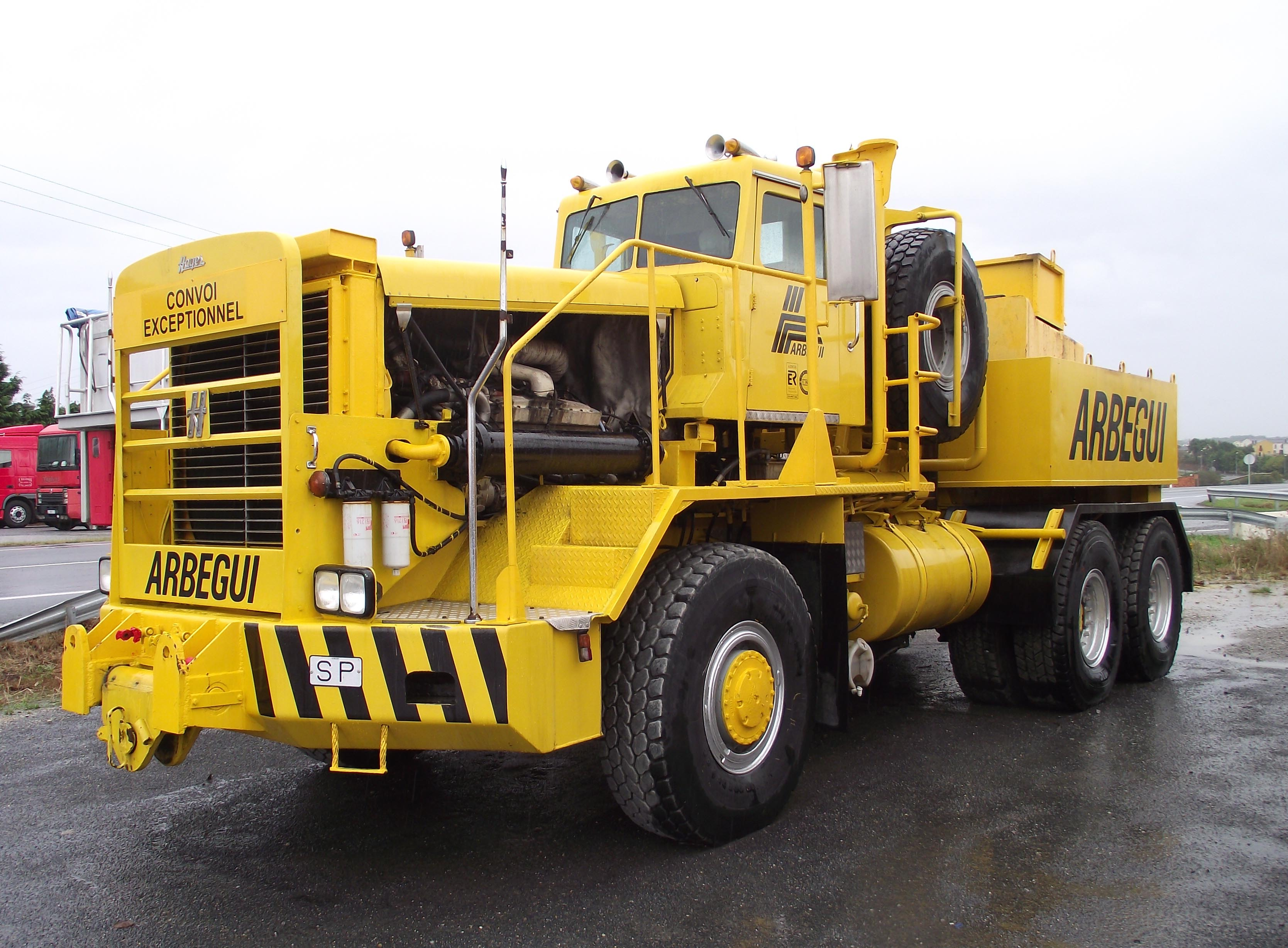
Hayes extra-heavy 6x6 (10-wheel) truck operated in Spain by Transportes Arbegui

== See also ==
- 6×4
- Driveline windup
- Eight-wheel drive
- Four-wheel drive
- H-drive
