= Mack NJU 5-ton 4x4 truck =

Truck Tractor, Ponton, C. O. E., 5-6 ton, 4x4 (Mack Model NJU-1)
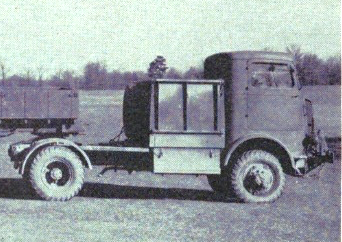
- Mack NJU-1 Ponton tractor
- Type: 5- to 6-ton 4x4 semi-tractor
- Place of origin: United States

Production history
- Manufacturer: Mack Trucks
- Produced: 1941-1942
- No. built: 692 (+8 NJU-2)
- Variants: NJU-2

Specifications (NJU-1)
- Mass: 16,580 lb (7,520 kg)
- Length: 19 ft 9 in (6.02 m)
- Width: 8 ft (2.44 m)
- Height: 9 ft 6 in (2.90 m)
- Engine: Mack EN532; 136 hp (101 kW)
- Transmission: 5 speed x 2 range trf case
- Suspension: Live axles on leaf springs

The Mack NJU 5- to 6-ton 4x4 Ponton tractor (G639) was a semi-tractor designed to haul bridging equipment during World War II. Of the 700 built 119 were supplied to the British in Egypt, 8 were built with van bodies, and the rest were used as a substitute standard by the US Army.

== History ==
In 1940 the US Army ordered 700 Mack 4 x 4 truck tractors, intended to tow pontoon-carrying semi-trailers. 694 were delivered in 1941 and the last 6 in 1942. An Autocar design was standardized by the US Army and only 700 NJUs were built.

692 NJU-1 tractors and 8 NJU-2 vans designed to tow topographical trailers were delivered.

In November 1941 119 semi-tractors were delivered to the British army in Egypt, where they bore War Department H-numbers.

Some NJU-1's went into French Army service post war.

== Design ==
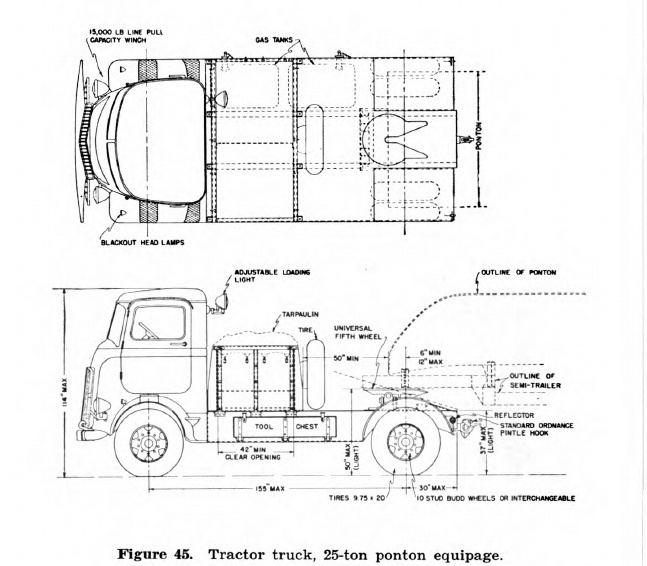
Mack NJU-1

The design was a militarized version of a civilian Cab Over Engine (COE) model, partly redesigned to make it 4WD. A Mack engine and transmission were matched with a Timken 2-speed transfer case and double-reduction axles. The EN532 engine was a 532 cu in (8.7 L) L-head inline 6 cylinder gasoline engine developing 136 hp (101 kW) at 2500 rpm. The 5-speed transmission drove the separate transfer case.

A ladder frame had two live beam axles on leaf springs with a 155 inches (3.94 m) wheelbase. There was a 15,000 pounds (6,800 kg) winch behind the front bumper and a pintle hitch at the rear. A civilian type closed cab was used, right behind the cab was an open cargo box used to carry engineer tools, outboard motors, and other equipment.

Early semi-tractors and all vans used 9.75x20 tires, later semi-tractors had 12.00x20 tires. All trucks had dual rear tires. All trucks had full-air brakes.

== Gallery ==
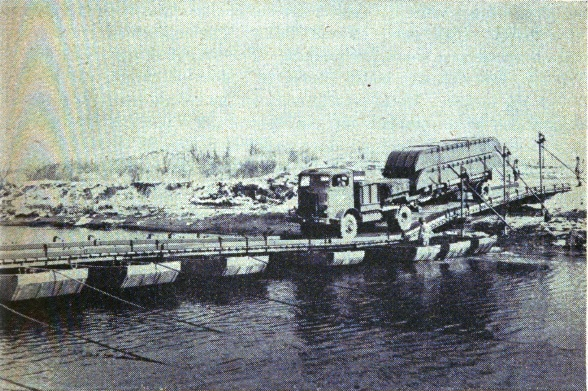
Mack NJU-1.1

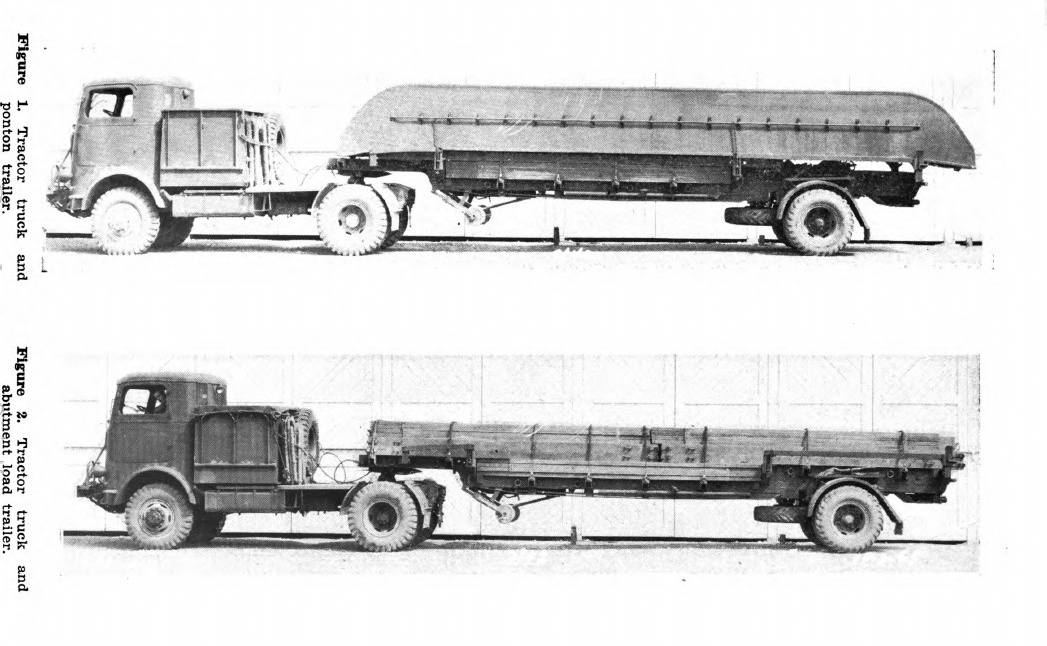
Mack NJU-1.3

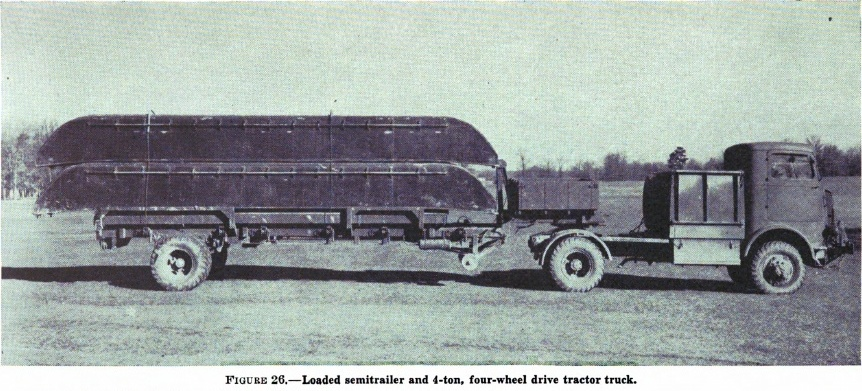
Mack NJU-1.6
