= Mack NO 7½-ton 6x6 truck =

American military heavy cargo truck

Mack NO series
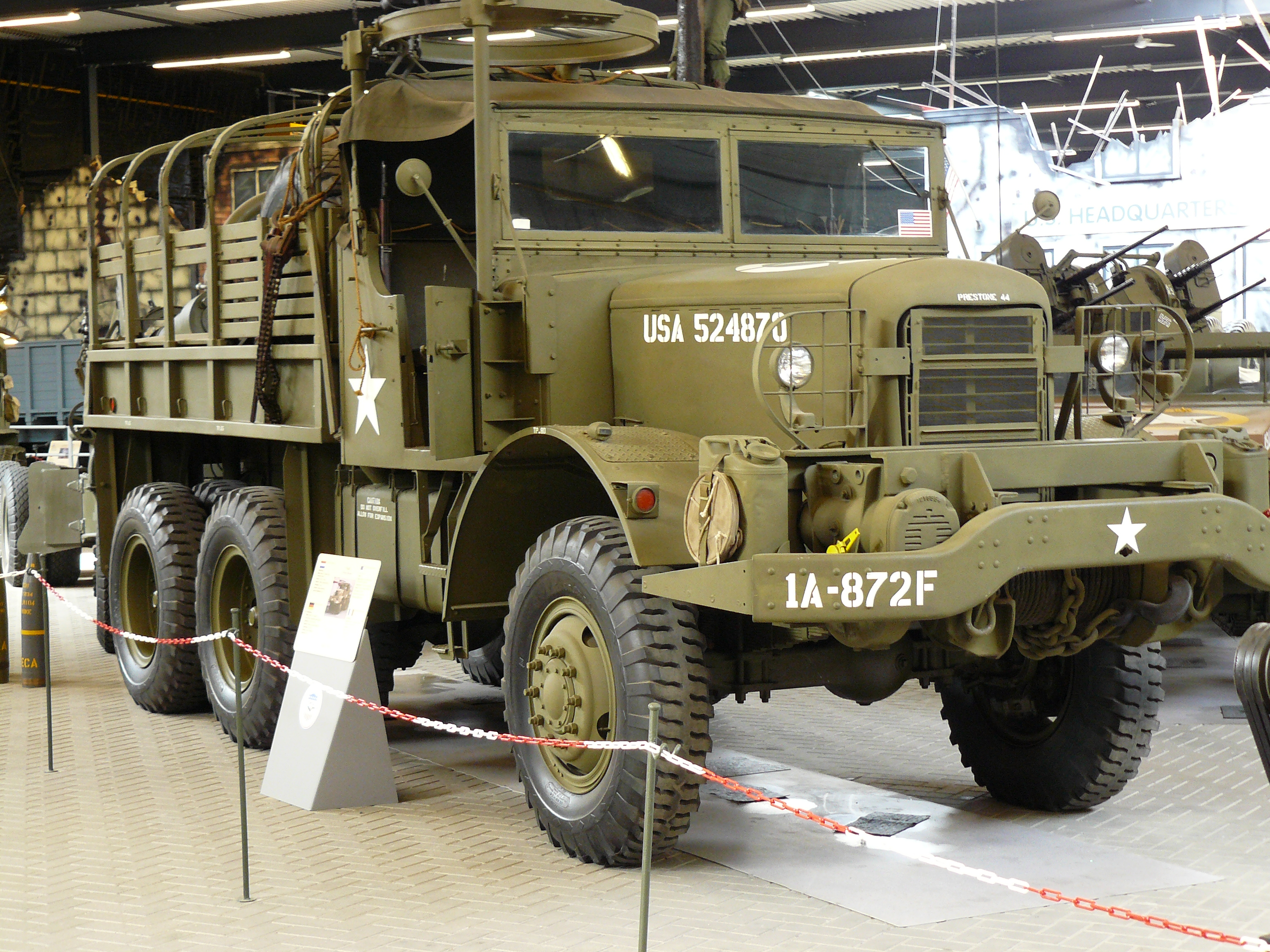
- Mack NO-6 truck; Overloon War Museum, Netherlands
- Type: 7 1/2-ton (6,803kg) 6x6 Prime mover
- Place of origin: United States

Production history
- Manufacturer: Mack Trucks
- Produced: 1943–1945
- No. built: 2,050 (total all models)
- Variants: NO2, NO3, NO6, NO7

Specifications (NO7)
- Mass: 29,103 lb (13,201 kg) empty
- Length: 24 feet 8 inches (7.52 m)
- Width: 8 feet 6 inches (2.59 m)
- Height: 10 feet 4 inches (3.15 m)
- Engine: Mack EY; 159 hp (119 kW) at 2,100 rpm
- Transmission: 5 speed dual range transfer case
- Suspension: Beam axles on leaf springs
- Fuel capacity: 160 US gal (610 L)
- Operational range: 400 mi (643.7 km) on road
- Maximum speed: 32 mph (51 km/h) on road

The Mack NO 7 1/2-ton 6x6 truck was a heavy 6x6 cargo truck designed in the 1940s by the American manufacturer Mack Trucks. It was used by the U.S. Army as an artillery tractor for heavy artillery during and after World War II. The official U.S. Army designation was: Truck, 7 1/2 ton, 6x6, Prime Mover. Its G-number was (G-532).

== History ==
In 1940, Mack Trucks started the development of a wheeled artillery tractor for the U.S. Army, with an off-road payload of 7 1/2 tons (6,803 kg), to tow the 155 mm gun, the 8 inch howitzer, the 8 inch gun, and the 240 mm howitzer. A contract for the production of the vehicle was awarded in September 1940, and in January 1942 a vehicle of the NO-1 type towed the first 240 mm howitzer carriage from the Bucyrus plant in South Milwaukee, Wisconsin to the Aberdeen Proving Ground test facility.

The NO-1 was the first in a series of five very similar prime mover vehicles. The NO-2 differed in details, among them a canvas cabin roof (the NO-1 had a metal roof) and the winch behind the front bumper (above the bumper in the NO-1). A total of 403 units of the NO-2 were delivered in 1943. The next prime mover models, which marginally differed from the NO-2, were the NO-3 and NO-6. A total of 1,097 units of these were ordered and delivered in 1943 and 1944. The last of the series was the NO−7 model, of which 188 were delivered in 1944 and 362 in 1945. Several NO-7 were provided after the war to the European armies being rebuilt, including those of United Kingdom, France, Belgium and Netherlands.

The models NO-4 and NO-5 were prototypes of heavy salvage vehicles, equipped with a Gar Wood crane which could swivel to the left and right. Neither model was put in production.

== Description ==
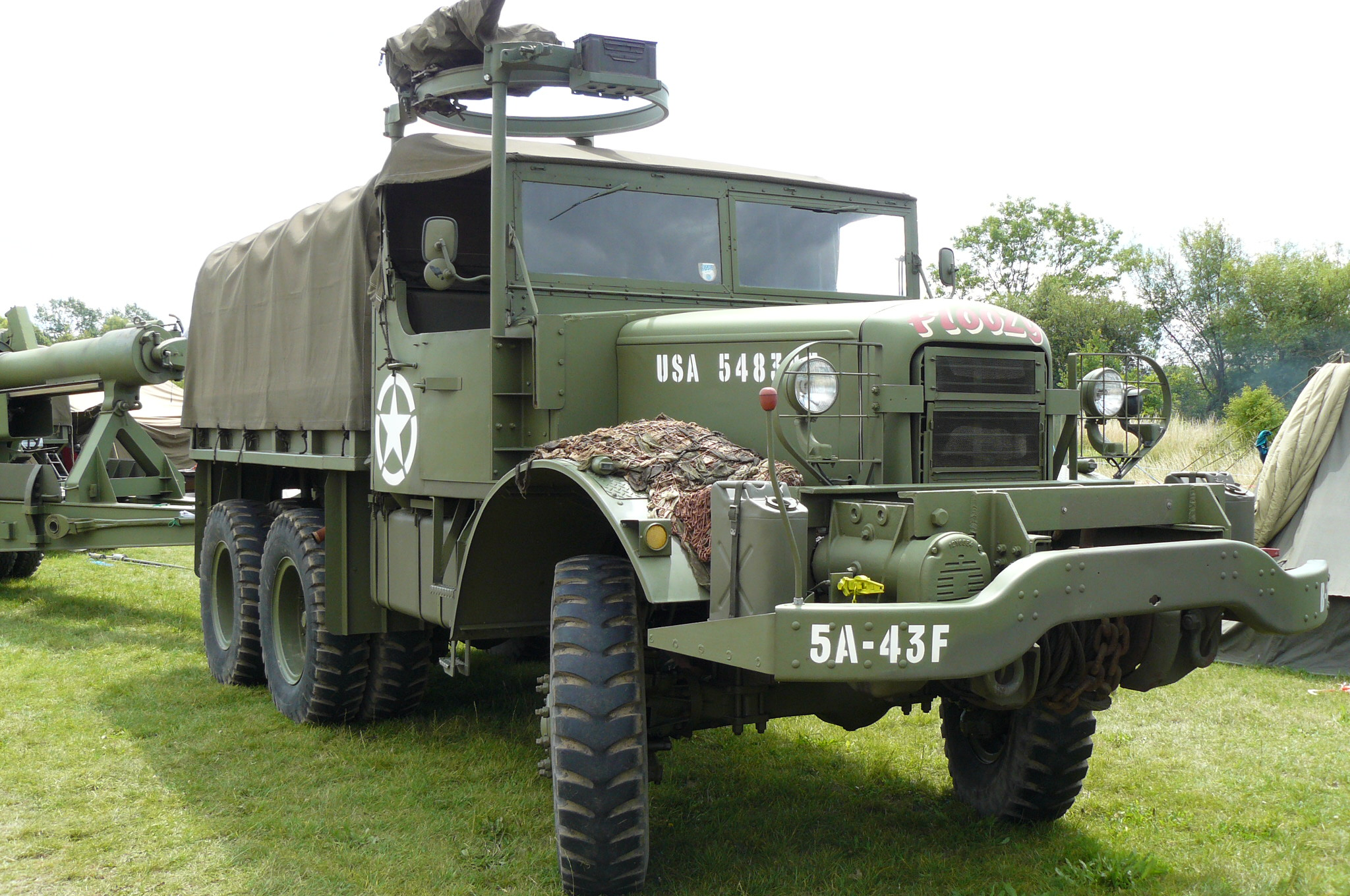
Mack NO towing a gun; War and Peace show

The vehicle had a typical configuration, with a hooded front engine behind which was a large driver cabin that could seat five soldiers, and a rear cargo area.

The engine was a Mack EY, 6-cylinder gasoline with a displacement of 707 cu in (11.6 L); generating 159 hp (119 kW) at 2100 rpm and 534 lbf⋅ft (724 N⋅m) at 800 rpm. The transmission had 5 gears forward and one reverse. The installation of a transfer case with an additional reduction gear allowed high and low gearing (5F1Rx2). Traction was in all six wheels (6x6), with 14.00-24 tires. The empty weight of the vehicle was 29,103 lb (13,201 kg), and 44,453 lb (20,164 kg) fully loaded.

The gas tanks were located on both sides of the vehicle, with a total capacity of 170 US gallons (640 L; 140 imp gal). At the front of the vehicle a Garwood winch was installed with a pulling capacity of 40,000 lb (18,000 kg). It could be used to assist in placing the gun, or to help moving the vehicle if it was stuck.

The cargo area was 11 ft (3.35 m) long by 8 ft (2.44 m) wide and could carry 7 1/2 tons (6,803 kg) of cargo. Starting with the NO-2 model, at the rear of the cargo compartment a small crane was installed to assist in placing the gun. The maximum towed load of the vehicle was 50,000 lb (22,680 kg)

== Variants ==
In total 2,053 Mack NO vehicles were built, in 7 variants as described in the following table.

Type	Model	Years Produced	Number Built
Artillery tractor	NO-1		1
Artillery tractor	NO-2	1943	403
Artillery tractor	NO-3 & NO-6	1943 to 1944	1,097
Salvage vehicle	NO-4		1
Salvage vehicle	NO-5		1
Artillery tractor	NO-7	1944 and 1945	550 (188 + 362)

== See also ==
- List of U.S. military vehicles by supply catalog designation (G-532)
- List of U.S. military vehicles by model number
- Mack Trucks
- Mack NR
