= List of soft-skinned vehicles of the British Empire's militaries in the First World War =

External image
- Aveling and Porter YLD road locomotive

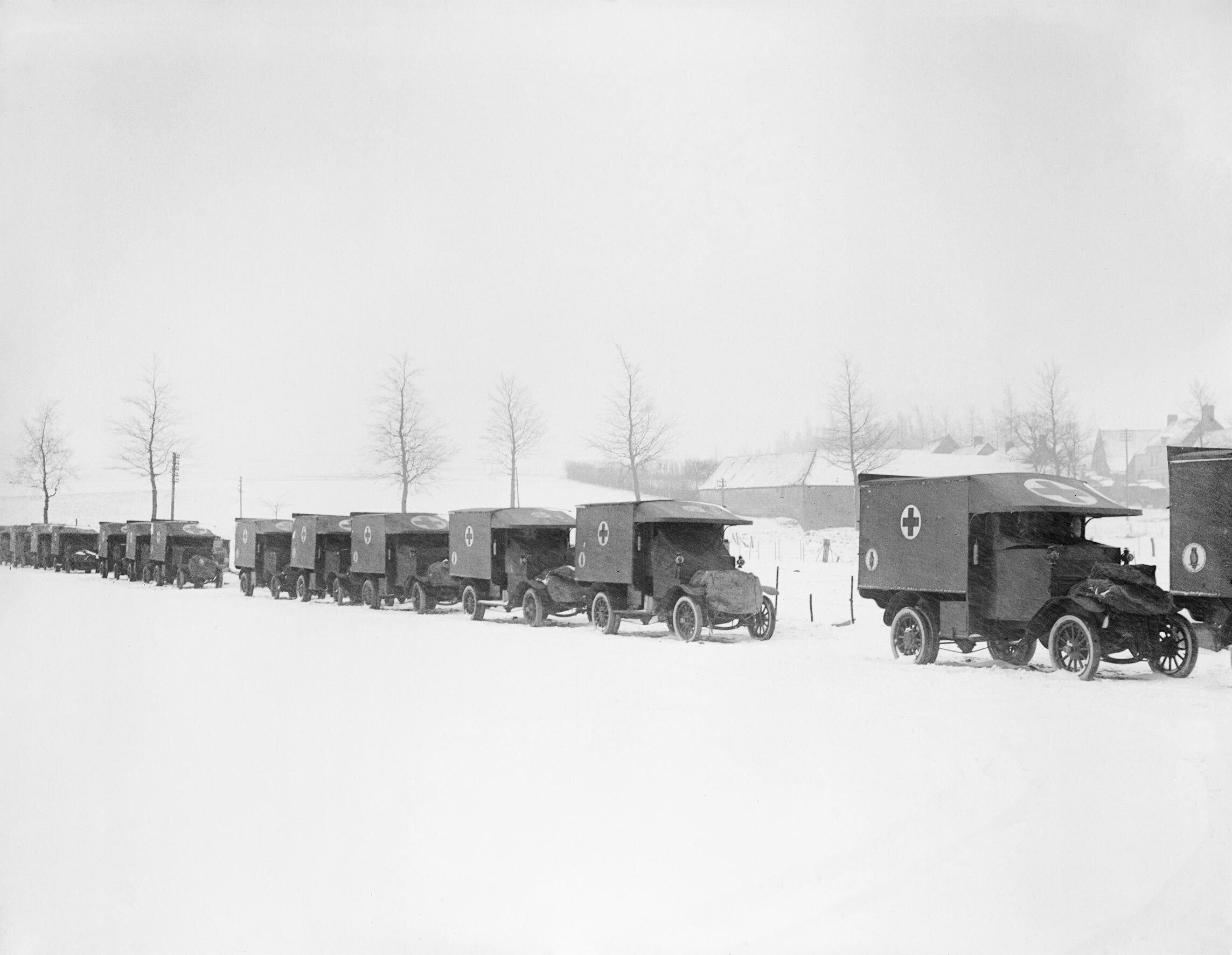
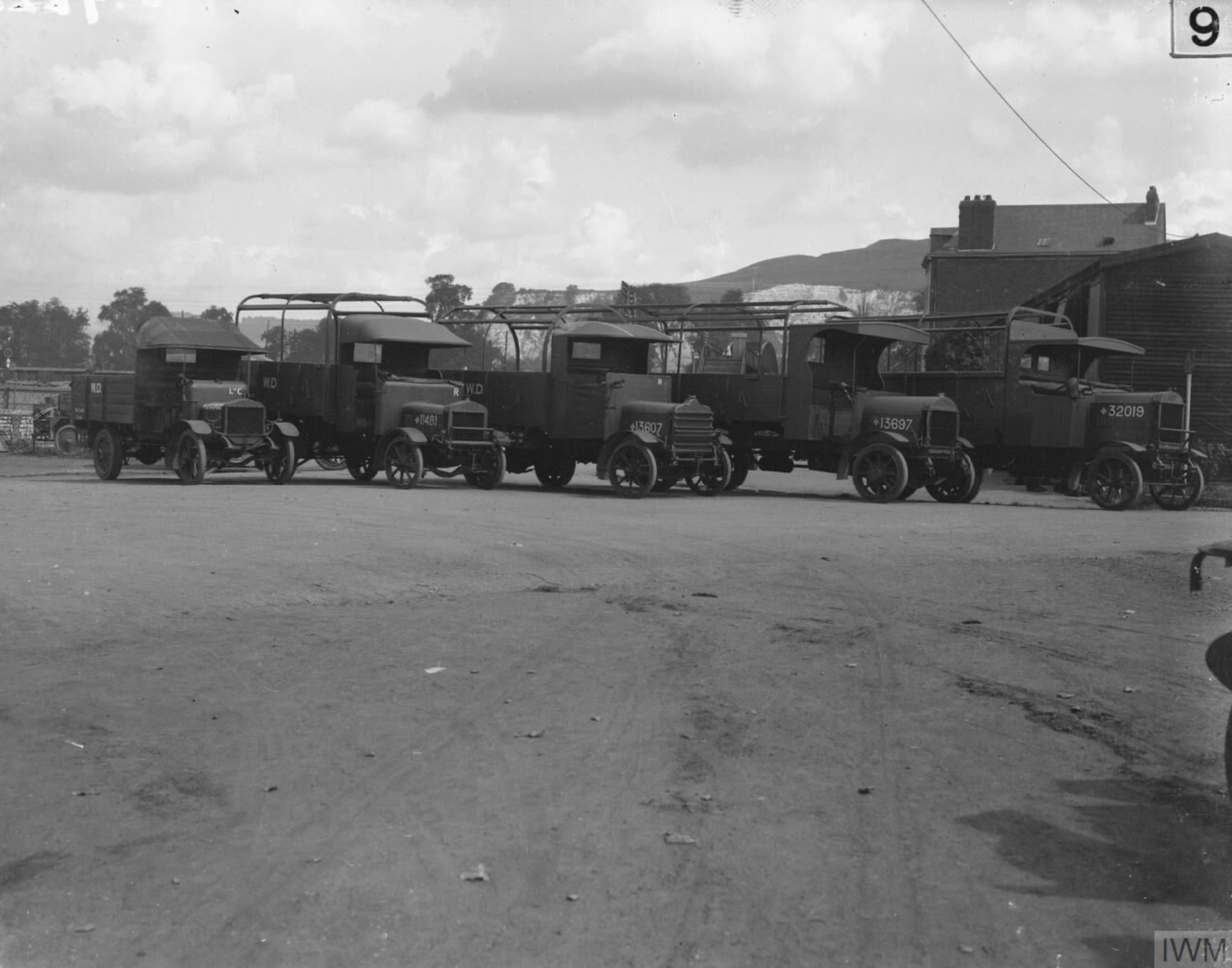
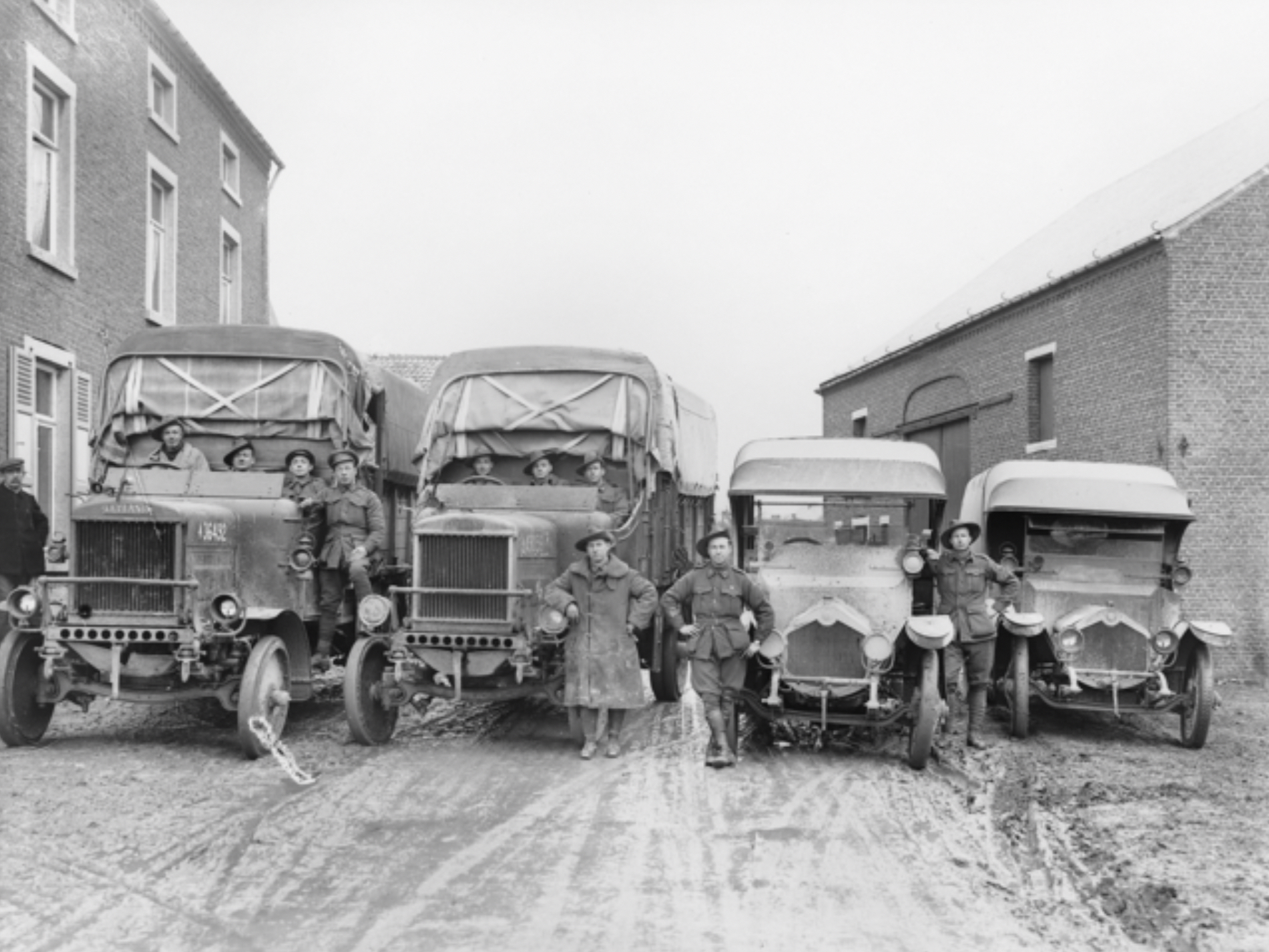
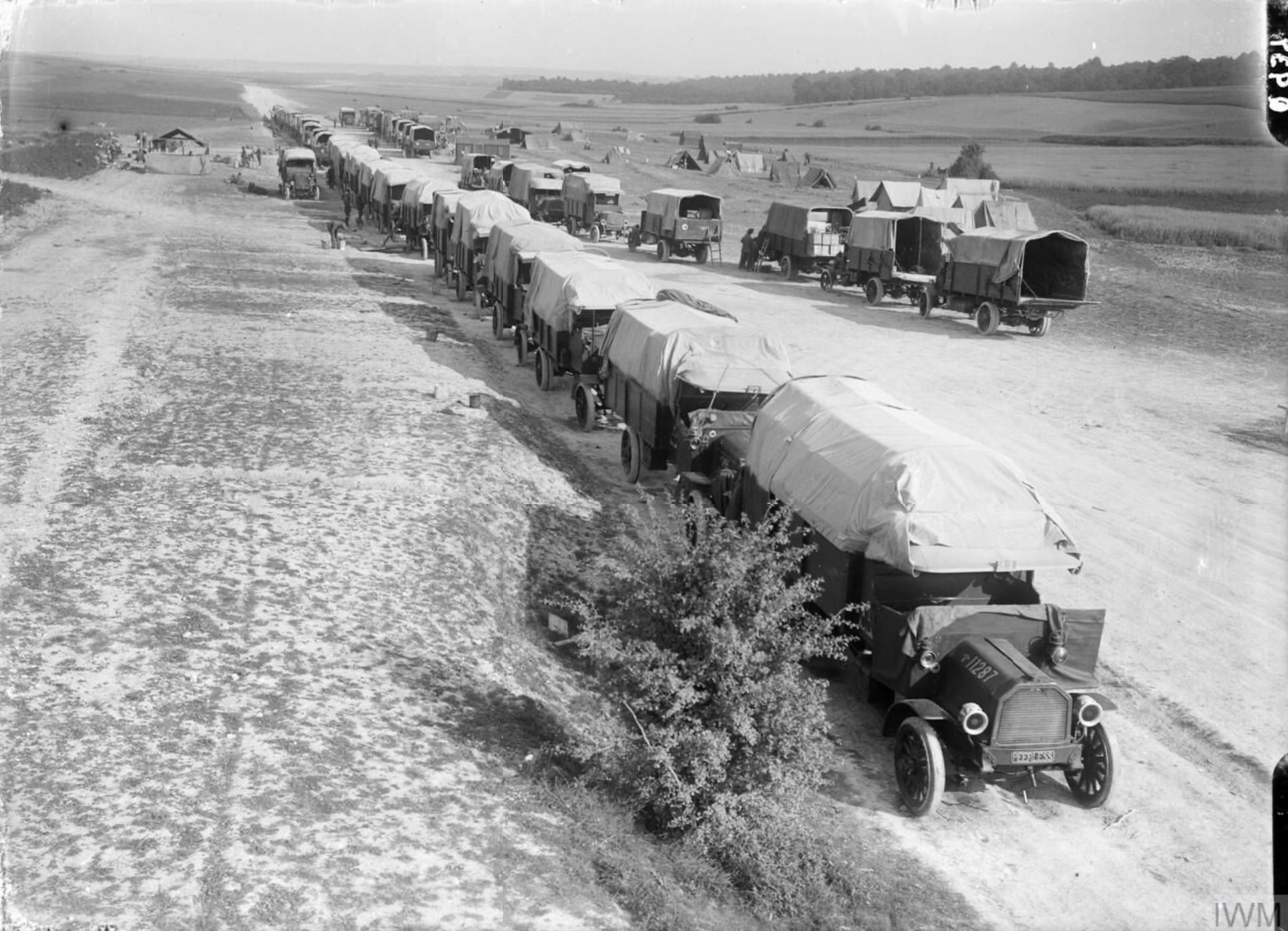

This is a list of soft-skinned vehicles of the British Empire's militaries in the First World War, including military lorry, motorcycle, steam wagon and tractor models that saw active service with a military arm of any country within the British Empire during the First World War.

== Historical overview ==
In 1911, the British War Office revised the terms of their motor vehicle "subsidy scheme", which sought to provide a financial subsidy to commercial truck operators to purchase approved vehicles that were suitable for military service. In exchange for the subsidy, in the event of a national emergency the vehicle had to be handed over to the War Office for issue to the military.

The subsidy scheme divided lorries into two classes defined by payload capacity, A-type for lorries of 3-ton payload capacity, and B-type for lorries of 30-cwt payload capacity. The lorries all had to meet a number of requirements, including a petrol 4-cylinder engine of greater than 30 hp (22 kW), a 4-forward 1-reverse transmission, leaf spring suspension, standardised controls and standardised weight and dimensions. To be deemed eligible for the subsidy, lorry manufacturers had to complete a trial run by the War Office. By December 1913, approximately 1,000 lorries were enrolled in the scheme.

On the outbreak of the First World War the majority of vehicles available to the British military were subsidy scheme lorries. Despite most manufacturers turning over their entire production capacity to the war effort for the duration of the conflict, throughout the war large numbers of additional vehicles were sourced from overseas, particularly from the United States. The war saw the introduction and development of many specialist vehicle types, including ambulances, staff cars, repair trucks and artillery tractors.

By the time of the Armistice in 1918, 48,177 motorcycles, 43,187 cars and ambulances, 66,352 lorries, 1,293 steam wagons and 6,121 tractors and other miscellaneous vehicles were in British military service. These were spread across multiple theatres including France, Flanders, Italy, Mesopotamia and East Africa, as well as respective home countries of the Empire.

== Classification ==
Within the armies of the Empire, wheeled soft-skinned vehicles were usually classified by weight class (Note: Refers to the nominal military payload ratings.) and drive. The most common weight classes being:

- 8-cwt = 8 long hundredweight, 0.40 long tons, 0.41 tonnes, 0.45 short tons
- 15-cwt = 15 long hundredweight, 0.75 long tons, 0.76 tonnes, 0.84 short tons
- 30-cwt = 30 long hundredweight, 1.5 long tons, 1.5 tonnes, 1.7 short tons
- 3-ton = 60 long hundredweight, 3.0 long tons, 3.0 tonnes, 3.4 short tons

== Motorcycles ==
Name	Image	Notes
A.G. Healing Precision Big Four		Motorcycle produced by Melbourne firm A.G. Healing with 4 1/4 HP engine.
BSA 3 1/2 HP, 4 HP & 4 1/2 HP		Motorcycles produced by the Birmingham Small Arms Company, 537 of the 4 HP model were in British service in 1918, as well as 551 of the 3 1/2 HP and 4 1/2 HP models.
Clyno/Vickers 5–6 HP		A motorcycle with sidecar jointly developed by Clyno and Vickers. It was equipped with a Vickers machine gun and tripod, a similar machine carried another passenger and ammunition. Just under 1,800 were in service in 1918.
Douglas 2¾ HP		Produced by Douglas, large numbers of the 2 3/4 hp motorcycle were supplied to the forces of the British Empire. It became a standardised Army type, 13,477 were in service in 1918. Also used by the Belgian and French Armies.
Douglas 4 HP		Larger capacity motorcycle built by Douglas. It became a standardised Army type, 4,816 were in service in 1918 with the forces of the Empire.
Phelon & Moore Panther		Motorcycle produced by Phelon & Moore, was used extensively by the Royal Flying Corps / Royal Air Force and other Flying Corps of the Empire. Powered by a 3 1/2 bhp (2.6 kW) engine, the Royal Flying Corps purchased almost the entirety of Phelon & Moore's wartime output.
Scott 486 cc		Scott Motorcycle Company motorcycle.
Triumph Trusty		Motorcycle produced by Triumph. Known as the 'Trusty' in service, it became a standardised Army type and over 17,000 were in service in 1918. Also used by the French Army.

== Cars, ambulances and light lorries ==
Name	Image	Type	Drive	Notes
Commer MC		1-ton lorry	Worm / RWD	1-ton lorry produced by Commer.
Crossley 20/25 HP		15-cwt tender / van / ambulance / staff car	Worm / RWD	The Crossley 20/25 HP was 15-cwt chassis that was produced with a number of bodies including light tender, van, ambulance and 4-seat staff car. The staff car was used exclusively by the Royal Flying Corps/Royal Air Force as well as the Flying Corps' of other countries from the Empire, the tender was produced in much larger numbers for general service duties on airfields. It was powered by a 4-cylinder 44 bhp (33 kW) engine and had a 11 ft 3 in (3.43 m) wheelbase. Approximately 6,000 vehicles were produced between 1914 and 1918, some remained in service until 1930.
Daimler TR 20 HP		4-seat car	Worm / RWD	The most numerous Daimler vehicle model in service during the war, it was commonly bodied as a 4-seat staff car but other body types were produced. It was powered by a 4-cylinder 35 bhp (26 kW) Knight sleeve valve engine and had a 10 ft 11 in (3.33 m) wheelbase.
Ford Model T		8–10-cwt lorry / car / ambulance	Worm / RWD	Produced by the Ford Motor Company, it was produced in a number of body types including light 8–10 cwt trucks, vans, staff cars, soup kitchens and ambulances. Powered by a 4-cylinder 20 bhp (15 kW) engine, it was produced in both standard 8 ft 4 in (2.54 m) and long wheelbases. At the end of the war 18,984 Model Ts were in service, in addition to US built vehicles, Model Ts were built in the UK, Canada and Ireland.
Garford Model 64		3/4-ton lorry	Chain / RWD	Produced by the American firm Garford Motor Truck Co of Ohio, small numbers of the 3/4-ton chain driven Model 64 were purchased by the War Office and used primarily as water carriers. It proved to be unreliable in service.
Garford Model 75		1-ton lorry	Worm / RWD	Produced by the American firm Garford Motor Truck Co of Ohio, as supply of the 1-ton Willys Model 65XT ceased, the War Office began purchasing the 1-ton worm driven Garford Model 75, primarily equipping them as water carriers. Like the Garford Model 64, the Model 75 proved to be unreliable in service.
Gramm-Bernstein WIL		1-ton lorry	RWD	1-ton lorry produced by the American firm Gramm-Bernstein, in 1915 small numbers were purchased by the War Office. They were found to be unreliable, and no further orders were placed.
Lanchester Model 19B		Staff car / ambulance / 15-cwt tender	Worm / RWD	Based on the Lanchester Motor Company's unusual 38 hp car, which mounted the engine next to the driver, the Model 19B chassis was variously bodied as a staff car, ambulance and 15-cwt tender. It was predominantly used by the Royal Naval Air Service. The chassis was also used in the Lanchester armoured car.
Napier 16/22 HP		15-cwt lorry / ambulance	RWD	A light lorry produced by Napier, it was based on a reinforced Napier car chassis. Approximately 2,000 Napier vehicles of various types saw service in the war.
Rolls-Royce 40/50 HP		Staff car / 15-cwt tender	Worm / RWD	Produced by Rolls-Royce, the 40/50 HP, also known as the Silver Ghost, was used in a number of roles during the war including open topped and closed top staff cars, and a 15-cwt tender. It was powered by a 6-cylinder 50 bhp (37 kW) engine and had a 11 ft 11 1/2 in (3.64 m) wheelbase. 321 were in service in 1918, the 40/50 HP also formed the basis of the Rolls-Royce armoured car.
Siddeley-Deasy Ambulance Van		Ambulance	Worm / RWD	Heavy ambulance produced by Siddeley-Deasy, over 500 served with the forces of the Empire during the war.
Studebaker		Staff car	Worm / RWD	Car produced by the American automaker Studebaker, 1,447 were in British service in 1918.
Sunbeam T 12/16 HP		Ambulance / car	Worm / RWD	Developed by the Sunbeam, the T 12/16 HP chassis was the basis for the standardised staff cars and heavy ambulances for the armies of the Empire from during the war. Powered by a 4-cylinder 201.9 cu in (3,308 cc) 33 bhp (25 kW) engine, it had a 10 ft 4 in (3.15 m) wheelbase. It was built in large numbers by Sunbeam as well as Rover, approximately 1,600 of the ambulances were in service in 1918.
Talbot 25/50 HP		Tourer / ambulance / 15-cwt tender	Worm / RWD	A heavy car chassis produced by Clément-Talbot, they were variously bodied as staff cars, tourers, vans, 15-cwt tenders, heavy ambulances and wireless vehicles. A number used by the Royal Naval Air Service armoured car division, in whose service several formed the basis of the Talbot armoured car. In 1919 there were 1,194 in service.
Vauxhall 25 HP D Type		Staff car / ambulance	Worm / RWD	Heavy luxury car chassis built by Vauxhall Motors, large numbers were supplied to the War Office during the war, they were bodied as a staff cars (usually with open tops, closed top cars were exclusively reserved for generals) and heavy ambulances. Powered by a 50 hp (37 kW) engine, it had a 10 ft 10 in (3.30 m) wheelbase. 1,855 were in service in 1918/1919.
Willys Model 65XT		1-ton lorry	RWD	Produced by American firm Willys, details of the Model 65XT in British service are scarce. They were powered by a 25.6 hp (19.1 kW) engine, and featured pneumatic tyres on the front and solid rubber tyres on the rear.
Wolseley 16/20, 24/30 & CA		Staff car / ambulance / 12-cwt lorry	Worm / RWD	A large number of different Wolseley Motors produced staff cars, ambulances and light lorries served with the forces of the British Empire during the war, many of which were privately donated or financed by public subscriptions. By 1919, 1,096 Wolseley cars, ambulances and light lorries of almost 40 different models remained in service.

== Buses, medium and heavy motor / steam lorries ==
Name	Image	Type	Drive	Notes
AEC (LGOC) B Type		Double-decker bus / 2-ton lorry	Worm / RWD	Produced by the Associated Equipment Company, least 900 B Type buses were purchased by the British military for use as troop transports in France and Belgium. Capable of carrying 24 soldiers, a number were also converted into pigeon lofts, ambulances and mobile kitchens, as well as being re-bodied and later produced as 2-ton WD lorries. 1,082 were in service in 1918.
AEC Y Type		3-ton lorry	Worm / RWD	First produced in March 1915 by the Associated Equipment Company, the Y Type was the most produced British heavy motor transport of the war. Initially powered by a Daimler 40 bhp (30 kW) engine and later a Tylor 49 hp (37 kW) engine, it had a 14 ft 3 in (4.34 m) wheelbase. 8,821 had been produced by the Armistice, of which 5,819 were in British service, and a number had been supplied to the American Expeditionary Forces in France.
Albion A3		30-cwt lorry	Chain / RWD	A 30-cwt chain drive lorry built by Albion Motors, a number were impressed into military service. Initially powered by a 12 hp (8.9 kW) engine, in 1914 it was upgraded with a 20 hp (15 kW) engine.
Albion A10		3-ton lorry	Chain / RWD	A 3-ton chain drive lorry built by Albion Motors, it was powered by a 32 hp (24 kW) engine and had a 13 ft 1 in (3.99 m) wheelbase. 5,563 were supplied to the forces of the British Empire during the war.
Alley & MacLellan Sentinel		5–6-ton steam wagon	RWD	Steam wagon built by Alley & MacLellan, 131 were in British military service by 1918, in GS cargo and tipper bodies.
Austin 2/3 ton		2–3-ton lorry	Worm / RWD	Produced by the Austin Motor Company, approximately 2000 were produced between 1913 and 1917. They were supplied to the British Army and Royal Navy, as well as the Imperial Russian Army. It was fitted with a number of bodies including searchlight, trench pump, workshop and field kitchen. The chassis was used in the Austin armoured car.
Autocar UF21		30-cwt lorry	Worm / RWD	Built by the American firm Autocar, it was powered by a 2-cylinder 18 hp (13 kW) engine and had a 8 ft 1 in (2.46 m) wheelbase. Some were used by Canadian forces from 1914, and almost 500 bare chassis were supplied to the British forces in 1917, 265 were bodied as water tankers and sent to France and 189 were bodied as cargo carriers and dispatched to East Africa.
Belsize lorries		2-ton & 3-ton lorries	Worm / RWD	Lorries made by Belsize Motors, the majority that served in the war were retained in the United Kingdom and used to conduct driver training. Sources contradict each other as to whether any served in France.
Berna C2		3 1/2–4-ton lorry	Worm / RWD	Lorry manufactured by Swiss firm Berna, in addition to serving with the Swiss Army, it was also purchased by the British and French militaries. Equipped with a 35 hp (26 kW) engine, the C2 was found to be exceptionally rugged in service. It remained it production until 1928 for the civilian market.
British Berna Model G		5-ton lorry	Worm / RWD	The Guildford based British Berna company was an offshoot of the Swiss Berna company. Powered by a 40 bhp (30 kW) engine, it had a 14 ft 1 in (4.29 m) wheelbase. Over 300 5-ton British Berna Model G's were supplied to the British Army during the war, in addition to 591 Swiss built examples that were in British military service by 1918.
Caledon Model B		3-ton lorry	RWD	Caledon Motors of Glasgow were originally a distributor of Commer vehicles but from 1914 experienced difficulties being supplied, so they started building their own lorries. Powered by a W.H. Dorman & Co engine, around 300 of their 3-ton Model Bs were purchased by the War Office, 76 of which were operated by the Ministry of Munitions, 50 were supplied to Imperial Russia and 40 were supplied to the American Expeditionary Forces.
Clayton steam wagon		Steam wagon	RWD	Steam wagon built by Clayton Wagons.
Commer RC		3-ton lorry	Chain / RWD	The first lorry built by Commer from 1907, in 1914 the RC qualified as a Subsidy A lorry. Powered by a 40.6 bhp (30.3 kW) engine, it had a 13 ft 3 in (4.04 m) wheelbase and enclosed chain final drive. More than 2,303 were in service by the end of the war.
Daimler Model CB & Model CC		3-ton lorry	Worm / RWD	3-ton lorries produced by Daimler, they were powered by a 40 hp (30 kW) Knight sleeve valve engine and had a 13 ft (3.96 m) wheelbase. 1,818 CBs and 366 CCs were in the service of the Empire's militaries in 1918. Body types included GS cargo and workshop.
Dennis A Type		3-ton lorry	Worm / RWD	A 3-ton Subsidy Scheme A lorry produced by Dennis Brothers from 1914, it was one of only two types produced by Dennis during the war. Powered by a 45 hp (34 kW) White and Poppe engine, it had a 13 ft 2 in (4.01 m) wheelbase. Approximately 3500 were supplied during the war, they proved popular with civilians once the War Office sold them post-war. A number were also supplied to the American Expeditionary Forces in France.
Dennis N Type		Fire engine	Worm / RWD	A fire engine produced by Dennis Brothers, a number were used by the British during the war. A number were also supplied to the American Expeditionary Forces in France.
Dennis-Stevens 3-ton		3-ton lorry	RWD	Petrol–electric lorry produced by Tilling-Stevens but utilising a Dennis Model A 3-ton chassis. The engine driven generator gave a consistent output that made it suitable to power a large searchlight mounted on the tray. 187 were in service in 1918, 113 in the UK and 74 in France.
Fiat 15 Ter		30-cwt lorry	Worm / RWD	Lorry built by Fiat from 1911, it was first used by Italian forces during the Italo-Turkish War. Powered by a 40 bhp (30 kW) engine, it had a 10 ft (3.05 m) wheelbase and worm final drive. During the First World War it served in large numbers with the Italian military, small numbers were also supplied to the French Army, the British Army and the American Expeditionary Forces. In 1918, 382 remained in British service, 294 of which were with the British Army in Italy.
Fiat 18BL		2 1/2-ton lorry	Chain / RWD	Lorry built by Fiat from the beginning of the war, it was designed at the request of the Italian War Department . Powered by a 38 bhp (28 kW) engine, it had enclosed chain final drive. In addition to service with the Italian military, small numbers were supplied to the French and the British Armies serving in Italy.
Foden 5-ton steam wagon		5-ton steam wagon	RWD	Steam wagon built by Foden, several were in British military service at the beginning of the war, but the vast majority that served through the war were civilian wagons impressed into service. 800 were in British military service by 1918, in GS cargo and tipper bodies.
FWD Model B		3-ton lorry	FWD	Produced by the Four Wheel Drive Auto Company, the Model B was one of the earliest 4x4 vehicles ever produced. First purchased by the British Army in 1914, 2925 were bought by the British during the war, including 500 produced under licence by Peerless especially for the British, it was used in much larger numbers by the American Expeditionary Forces.
Halley Model G		4-ton & 6-ton lorries	Chain / RWD	Halley Industrial Motors of Yoker, Glasgow, produced the 4-ton Model G1 and the 6-ton Model G3. Powered by a 45 hp (34 kW) engine, they had a 14 ft 1 in (4.29 m) wheelbase. Almost 600 were in service in 1918, approximately 200 of which were impressed civilian vehicles.
Halley Model W		30-cwt lorry	Chain / RWD	30-cwt War Office Subsidy B lorry by Halley Industrial Motors. Powered by a 25 hp (19 kW) engine, it had an 11 ft (3.4 m) wheelbase.
Hallford EIDI 80		3-ton lorry	Chain / RWD	3-ton War Office Subsidy A lorry produced by J & E Hall of Dartford, Kent. Powered by a 42 hp (31 kW) W.H. Dorman & Co petrol engine, they had a 13 ft 3 in (4.04 m) wheelbase and chain driven rear wheels, although the drive chains were enclosed in aluminium cases.
Karrier WDS		3-ton lorry	Worm / RWD	Produced by Karrier of Huddersfield, the WDS was a War Office 3-ton Subsidy A type. It was powered by a 50 hp (37 kW) Tylor petrol engine, the most powerful engine fitted to a War Office subsidy scheme lorry, they had a 14 ft 2 in (4.32 m) wheelbase. 1,738 were in service in 1918, additionally some were supplied to the American Expeditionary Forces.
Kelly-Springfield K40		3-ton lorry	Chain / RWD	Produced by the American firm Kelly-Springfield, in 1914 the Canadian government ordered a quantity, most of which served in Europe with the Canadian Army. A small number were also operated by British forces, they were likely impressed civilian vehicles. Kelly-Springfield lorries were quite unpopular in service, specific issues including metal fatigue and cracking, crankshaft distortion, failure prone brakes, the lack of oil gauge on the dashboard, and most notably the "utterly hopeless" radiator.
Lacre 38 HP		3-ton lorry	Chain / RWD	Produced by the Lacre Motor Car Co, this was one of a number of lorry types purchased by the Australian military in 1914.
Lacre 0 Type		2-ton articulated lorry	Chain / RWD	Produced by the Lacre Motor Car Co, the Model 0 was one of the earliest articulated lorries, it consisted of a 2-ton tractor and a two-wheeled articulated trailer. Approximately 100 provided to the British military, they were used by both the British Army and the Royal Flying Corps / Royal Air Force.
Lancia 1Z		30-cwt lorry	Worm / RWD	Lorry built by Lancia, a number were imported from Italy by Gaston, Williams and Wigmore and used by the Royal Naval Air Service as light tenders.
Leyland RAF Type		3-ton lorry	Worm / RWD	Produced by Leyland Motors, this was the first lorry to qualify as a War Office Subsidy A lorry in 1912. Powered by a 36 bhp (27 kW) engine, they had a 13 ft 10 1/2 in (4.23 m) wheelbase. 5,932 were in service in 1918, including 4,271 with the Royal Flying Corps / Royal Air Force and the Flying Corps of countries of the Empire. After the war Leyland bought back as many as they could, reconditioned them and resold them as the Leyland "RAF Type".
Leyland Subsidy B Type		30-cwt lorry	Worm / RWD	A 30-cwt lorry produced by Leyland Motors, it was the first lorry to qualify as a War Department Subsidy B lorry in 1912. In service it was found the 3-ton "RAF Type" was more useful, and production of the Subsidy B Type was discontinued.
Leyland X Type		3-ton lorry	Worm / RWD	A number of Leyland X3 Types were trialled by the War Office for exercises in 1907–1908. A number of very similar civilian vehicles were impressed into military service in 1914.
Locomobile-Riker Model B		3-ton lorry	Worm / RWD	Produced by the American firm Locomobile, the company's truck line were marketed as 'Rikers' after designer and company president Andrew Riker. During the war the approximately 3,000 3 1/2-ton Locomobile-Riker lorries were provided to the British and American militaries, 1,192 were in British service in 1918. A number of problems presented in military service, including cracking radiators and breaking half shafts.
Mack AC		3 1/2-ton & 5 1/2-ton lorries	Chain / RWD	Produced by Mack Trucks, the British purchased 2,000 3 1/2-ton and 5 1/2-ton ACs during the war. It was British soldiers who game the Mack marque the nickname 'Bulldog' as a reference to the strength, reliability and performance of the AC in military service.
Maudslay 3-ton Subsidy		3-ton lorry	Worm / RWD	Lorry built by the Maudslay Motor Company to Subsidy Scheme specifications, the model was also co-produced by Rover. Powered by a 40 hp (30 kW) engine, they had a 13 ft 8 in (4.17 m) wheelbase. The model failed to achieve subsidy certification, but was ordered by the War Department anyway. 1,547 of the 3-ton model were in service by 1918, of a total of 1,718 Maudslay lorries which included 5-ton and 6-ton variants.
Milnes-Daimler 35 HP		3-ton lorry	RWD	German Daimler lorry marketed in the United Kingdom by G. F. Milnes & Co., in 1918 there were 32 in service, mostly impressed civilian vehicles.
Napier B72		30-cwt lorry	RWD	Produced by Napier, the B72 was effectively a lighter 30-cwt version of Napier's 3-ton 30/45, 400 were in service in 1918.
Napier 30/45		3-ton lorry	RWD	3-ton lorry produced by Napier. Approximately 2,000 30-cwt and 3-ton Napier lorries were acquired by the War Office during the war.
Packard Model D		1 1/2–2-ton, 3-ton & 5-ton lorries	Worm & chain / RWD	During the war the British purchased hundreds of lorries from Packard, including 1 1/2–2-ton, 3-ton and 5-ton models. The 1 1/2–2-ton had a live worm drive rear axle, many of the heavier models' rear wheels were chain driven.
Pagefield N Type		3-ton lorry	Worm / RWD	A Subsidy A lorry produced by Walker Brothers based in Wigan, it was accepted for subsidy status in 1913. Powered by a 40 hp (30 kW) engine, they had a 12 ft 4 in (3.76 m) wheelbase. The very first War Office Subsidy Scheme lorry to be impressed with a Pagefield N Type, 492 were in service in 1918.
Peerless TC4		3-ton lorry	Chain / RWD	Produced by the American firm Peerless, over 10,000 TC4's were purchased by the British during the war, making it the most numerous lorry model in the service of British Empire's militaries in the conflict. The Peerless TC4 had chain final drive, and was built in a wide variety of body types, the last were retired from service in 1940. It also formed the basis of the Peerless armoured AA lorry, and the Peerless armoured car.
Pierce-Arrow Model R		3-ton lorry	Worm / RWD	Produced by the American firm Pierce-Arrow, during the war approximately 11,350 Model Rs were provided to the militaries of the British Empire, France and Imperial Russia. 1,705 Model Rs were in British military service by 1918. The Model R also formed the basis of the Pierce-Arrow armoured lorry and Pierce-Arrow armoured AA lorry.
Seabrook Standard		5-ton lorry	Chain / RWD	In the 1910s, brothers Herbert and Percy Seabrook began importing Standard Motor Truck Company lorries to England. They imported 2-ton, 3-ton and 5-ton chassis, calling them the Seabrook Standard. They had a 32 hp (24 kW) Continental engine and chain driven rear wheels. It is unknown how many were purchased during the war, but likely low hundreds. The chassis was used in the Seabrook armoured lorry.
Straker-Squire CO		3-ton lorry	RWD	Produced by Straker-Squire, several hundred were in service in 1918, including 58 impressed former civilian vehicles.
Thornycroft BT Type		2-ton lorry	RWD	Produced by Thornycroft before the war, approximately 70 civilian 2-ton BT Types were impressed into military service by the War Office.
Thornycroft J Type		3-ton lorry	Worm / RWD	Subsidy A lorry produced by Thornycroft, it was powered by a 45 bhp (34 kW) engine and had a 13 ft 8 in (4.17 m) wheelbase. Approximately 5,000 J Types were supplied to the War Office during the war, they were fitted with a number of bodies including GS cargo and Anti-Aircraft gun carrier, with a QF 13-pounder 6 cwt or QF 13-pounder 9 cwt gun mounted on the rear.
Thornycroft M Type		3-ton lorry	Chain / RWD	Produced by Thornycroft before the war and designed for service in Britain's colonial possessions, the M Type was designed to move over soft and uneven ground, it was equipped with a traverse sprung front axle to prevent its frame twisting. A small number of civilian M Types were impressed into military service by the War Office.
Thornycroft X Type		2-ton lorry	Worm / RWD	The majority of Thornycroft's wartime production was dedicated to the J Type, but several hundred 2-ton X Types were produced during the war. They predominantly served in India.
Tilling-Stevens		3-ton lorry	RWD	Petrol–electric lorry produced by Tilling-Stevens, as the rear wheels were electrically driven there was no need for a gearbox, reducing the complexity for the driver. Purchased in very small numbers by the War Office during the war, several hundred were purchased by the French and were used for driver training.
Vulcan D Type		3-ton lorry	RWD	3-ton lorry produced by Vulcan.
Vulcan S Type		30-cwt lorry	RWD	30-cwt lorry produced by Vulcan.
White Class A		1 1/2-ton lorry	Worm / RWD	1 1/2-ton lorry produced by White Motor Company, it was effectively a militarised version of White's Model TBC civilian lorry. White provided over 18,000 lorries to the militaries of the United States, France, Russia and the British Empire during the war, in the latter's service they predominantly served with Canadian forces, but also other forces from the Empire in much smaller numbers.
Wolseley CL		30-cwt lorry	Worm / RWD	A 30-cwt Subsidy B lorry produced by Wolseley Motors, it was powered by a 25.4 hp (18.9 kW) engine and had a 12 ft (3.66 m) wheelbase, in appearance it was a slightly smaller version of the 3-ton Wolseley CR. Only 50 Wolseley CLs had been produced by the end of the war.
Wolseley CR		3-ton lorry	Worm / RWD	A 3-ton Subsidy A lorry produced by Wolseley Motors, it was powered by a 4-cylinder 34.2 hp (25.5 kW) engine and had a 13 ft 9 in (4.19 m) wheelbase. Production totalled 385, of which 353 were still in service by the end of the war, it was produced with a number of body types including GS cargo and tanker.

== Tractors and road locomotives ==
Name	Image	Type	Drive	Notes
Aveling and Porter YLD		Road locomotive	RWD	Road locomotive produced by Aveling and Porter.
Clayton 110 HP		Artillery tractor	Half-track	Heavy artillery tractor produced by Clayton & Shuttleworth, it was very similar to the tiller wheel Holt tractors. Powered by a powered by a National Gas Engine Co. petrol-kerosene engine, it weighed approximately 13 long tons (13.2 t). Introduced in 1916, 250 were produced between 1917 and 1918.
Clayton Chain Rail		Tractor	Tracks	Crawler tractor produced by Clayton & Shuttleworth and provided to the War Office to tow the Handley Page bombers. Powered by a 35 hp (26 kW) Dorman 4-cylinder petrol/paraffin engine.
Foster-Daimler tractor		Artillery tractor	RWD	The Foster-Daimler tractor was a large petrol powered tractor built by William Foster & Co. that was purchased to haul the BL 15-inch howitzer, in the later war years they were used to tow a variety of heavy loads. 74 were in service in 1918, its engine was also used to power the early British tanks.
Fowler Lion		Road locomotive	RWD	Road locomotive produced by John Fowler & Co., it was able to tow 18 long tons (18.29 t). 75 were in service in 1918 as well as a large number of Fowler produced trailers, and 42 Fowler steam rollers.
Holt 75		Tractor	Half-track	Heavy tractor produced by the Holt Manufacturing Company, large numbers were purchased by the British and used by the militaries of the Empire throughout the war as artillery and general load tractors. Powered by a 4-cylinder 75 hp (56 kW) engine and weighing approximately 10 3/4 long tons (10.9 t), it had a single steerable tiller wheel at the front and continuous tracks at the rear. Also produced by Ruston, Proctor & Co during the war.
Holt 120		Tractor	Half-track	Larger and heavier than the Holt 75, small numbers of the Holt 120 were purchased by the British during the war. Powered by a 6-cylinder 120 hp (89 kW) engine, it weighed slightly over 12 long tons (12.2 t).
McLaren road locomotive		Road locomotive	RWD	Road locomotive produced by J&H McLaren & Co., and used to tow artillery in the early war years until replaced by Holt tractors, when they were redeployed to tow other loads. 52 served with the British military during the war.
Wallis & Steevens light		Road locomotive	RWD	Road locomotive produced by Wallis & Steevens. Capable of towing roughly 5 long tons (5.08 t), approximately 20 were in service in 1918 as well as 10 Wallis & Steevens steam rollers.

== See also ==
- List of soft-skinned vehicles of the US military
