= List of soft-skinned vehicles of the US military =

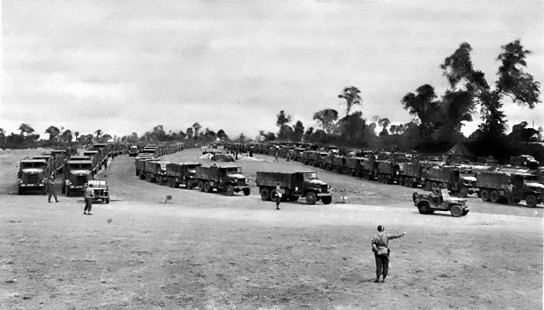
Several truck types of the Red Ball Express

This list of soft-skinned vehicles of the United States military is a list of soft-skinned vehicle models (Note: In some cases soft-skinned vehicle models listed may have received vehicle armor for crew defense.) that have seen active service in the United States Armed Forces, including military trucks, motorcycles, side-by-sides and tractors.

== Motorcycles and side-by-sides ==
Name	Image	Class (Note: Tonnage refers to the nominal off-road payload ratings. Tonnage is listed in short tons, 1 short ton = 2,000 pounds; 0.91 tonnes; 0.89 long tons.)	Drive	Service entry	Notes
Harley-Davidson Government Model		Motorcycle	2x1	1917–18	Produced by Harley-Davidson during World War I, 14,666 were supplied during the conflict.
Harley-Davidson WLA		Motorcycle	2x1	1942	Produced by Harley-Davidson during World War II, it was basically a militarized version of their WL model, with features such as a scabbard for a sub-machine gun and an ammunition box.
Harley-Davidson XA		Motorcycle	2x1	1942	Produced by Harley-Davidson during World War II.
Indian 841		Motorcycle	2x1	1941	Produced by the Indian Motorcycle Company during World War II.
John Deere M-Gator		Side-by-side	6x4	1997	A side-by-side produced by John Deere, it is based on their agricultural Gator range.
Polaris MRZR		Side-by-side	4x4	2013	Produced by Polaris, it is a militarised version of their RZR model that is used by special forces.

== Cars, jeeps and light trucks ==
Name	Image	Class	Drive	Service entry	Notes
American Bantam BRC-40		1/4-ton vehicle	4x4	1940	Produced by the American Bantam to meet US Army Quartermaster Corps request, this was the first practical Jeep design; 2,675 were built for the Army before production switched to the Willys MB.
American Motors M422 'Mighty Mite'		1/4-ton vehicle	4x4	1960	Produced by the American Motors Corporation, it was probably the smallest practical jeep model produced; around 4,000 were built for the United States Marine Corps.
AM General HMMWV		1 1/4-ton truck	4x4	1983	Produced by AM General as a replacement for a number of types in the US inventory, it is used by all branches of the US Armed Forces and various other nations; as of early 2018 over 281,000 have been produced.
Autocar Type XXI		2-ton truck	4x2	1910s	Produced by the Autocar Company from 1908, small numbers served with the National Guard, never leaving US soil.
Cadillac Type 57		Staff car	4x2	1918	Staff car produced by Cadillac from 1918, it was standardised by the US Army in both closed top and open touring versions. Either 1,956 or 2,095 were shipped to France.
Chevrolet CUCV II		1 1/4-ton truck	4x4	1987	A Commercial Utility Cargo Vehicle produced by Chevrolet when production of the original CUCV ceased; approximately 800 were purchased by the US Armed Forces.
Chevrolet LSSV		3/4–1 1/4-ton truck	4x4	2001	A range of Light Service Support Vehicle produced by Chevrolet when production of the CUCV II ceased.
CONDEC Gama Goat		1 1/4-ton truck	6x6	1969	An articulated, twin bodies, high mobility truck produced by Consolidated Diesel Electric Company (CONDEC); 14,000 were built.
Dodge M37		3/4-ton truck	4x4	1958	Produced by Dodge as a modernized equivalent of Dodge's WC series.
Dodge M880/M890 CUCV		1 1/4-ton truck	4x4 / 4x2	1976	A Commercial Utility Cargo Vehicle produced by Dodge, it was a militarised version of Dodge's W200 3/4-ton pickup.
Dodge Model 30		1/2-ton truck / staff car	4x2	1916	Produced by Dodge, first used by the US Army during the Pancho Villa Expedition, it was widely used during the First World War as a staff car, 1/2-ton light delivery truck, ambulance and light repair truck.
Dodge VC series		1/2-ton truck	4x4	1940	Produced by Dodge from a commercial design base, 4,640 were produced before production switched to the WC series.
Dodge WC series		1/2–1 1/2-ton truck	4x4 / 6x6	1941	Produced by Dodge, initially as a 1/2-ton then later an upgraded and revised 3/4-ton 4x4 truck, it was produced in a number of body types, a 1 1/2-ton 6x6 version which shared many components was also produced; more than 255,000 of all versions were manufactured during World War II.
Ford GPA 'Seep'		1/4-ton amphibian	4x4	1942	Produced by the Ford Motor Company, it mated the drivetrain of the Ford GPW with a lightweight steel hull to produce a light amphibious vehicle; 12,785 were produced during World War II with many being provided to the Soviet Union.
Ford Model T		1/2-ton truck	4x2	1917	Produced by Ford, over 12,000 were supplied to the US Army during World War I with around 7,000 serving overseas; some remained in service until the 1930s. Versions included staff cars, ambulances, van and cargo trucks and a light artillery tractor.
GMC Model 16		3/4-ton truck	4x2	1916	Produced by General Motors Company, it was used by the US Army during the Pancho Villa Expedition and World War I with a number of bodies including ambulances; 5,000 were purchased.
GM Defence ISV		1 1/2-ton truck	4x4	2020	Developed by General Motors from their Chevrolet Colorado pick-up truck to provide squad level mobility with an unarmored, off-road capable vehicle based on a commercial design for the US Army's Infantry Brigades; production of 2,065 vehicles commenced in June 2020.
GM M1009 CUCV		1 1/4-ton truck	4x4	1984	A Commercial Utility Cargo Vehicle produced by General Motors, it was a militarised diesel powered version of Chevrolet's K2500 pickup with a K3500 front axle.
International M-2-4		1-ton truck	4x4	1941	Produced by International during World War II for the USMC; the majority of the 10,450 produced were light cargo trucks.
Kaiser M715		1 1/4-ton truck	4x4	1967	Produced by Kaiser Jeep as a militarised version of their commercial Gladiator model pickup truck; 20,680 were produced for the US Army.
Land Rover RSOV		Special Operations Vehicle	4x4	1992	Produced by Land Rover it is based on the Land Rover Defender, it was purchased by the US Army after the Gulf War to provide an off-road, air-portable, rapid reaction weapons platform to replace the M151 in Special Forces use; 60 were purchased and as of 2020 remained in service with the 75th Ranger Regiment.
Locomobile Model 48		Staff car	4x2	1917–1918	Luxury staff car produced by Locomobile, these cars were reserved for the highest ranked officers within the American Expeditionary Forces during the First World War. Two were specially built for General Pershing with narrower chassis and V-shaped windscreens to reduce wind resistance.
M151 'MUTT'		1/4-ton vehicle	4x4	1960	Designed by Ford and produced by Ford, Kaiser and AM General, around 432,000 were produced from 1960 to 1988, it served with over 100 militaries worldwide.
M1161 Growler		1-ton vehicle	4x4	2009	Developed by American Growler as a vehicle for the USMC that could be transported internally in a V-22 Osprey.
Vauxhall B-Type		Staff car	4x2	1917–1918	Touring car produced by Vauxhall, during the First World War an unknown number of B-Types were used by the Services of Supply branch of the American Expeditionary Forces in England.
Willys MB / Ford GPW		1/4-ton vehicle	4x4	1941	Produced by Willys to meet a requirement from the US Army Quartermaster Corps, Willys were unable to meet production demands for the Willys MB so Ford also commenced production of the almost identical Ford GPW; a combined 639,245 MBs/GPWs were produced during World War II and were used by all US services and all Allies in every theater of the war.
Willys M38		1/4-ton vehicle	4x4	1949	Produced by Willys as a militarized version of their civilian CJ-3 model, it supplemented the venerable wartime Willys MBs/Ford GPWs in US service as they began to wear out. 50,000 were built.
Willys M38A1		1/4-ton vehicle	4x4	1952	Produced by Willys as a follow on from the M38; 101,488 were built.
Willys M274 'Mechanical Mule'		1/2-ton load carrier	4x4	1956	Produced by Willys as a low-profile load carrier to transport ammunition and stores.

== Medium and heavy trucks ==
Name	Image	Class	Drive	Service entry	Notes
6-ton 6×6 truck '666'		6-ton truck	6x6	1941	The US Army's standard 6-ton truck during World War II, it was built by Brockway, Corbitt, FWD, Ward LaFrance and White in three chassis lengths and several body types.
7½-ton 6×6 truck		7 1/2-ton truck	6x6	1940s	A standardized 7 1/2-ton truck used during World War II; it was produced by Biederman, Federal and REO. The F1 tractor was used by the US Army Air Force as a semi-tractor to tow fuel tanker trailer, the C2 wrecker was used by the US Army Air Force and US Navy to lift disabled aircraft onto trailers that could be towed by the wrecker's own fifth-wheel.
AEC Y Type		3-ton truck	4x2	1917	British truck built by the Associated Equipment Company that was used by the American Expeditionary Forces in France during World War I.
AM General M809 series		5-ton truck	6x6	1970	A 5-ton 6×6 truck produced by AM General as a replacement for the M39 series; at least 38,000 were produced in a number of variants.
AM General M939 series		5-ton truck	6x6	1982	A 5-ton 6×6 truck produced by AM General as a product-improvement of the M809 series; at least 25,000 were produced in a number of variants.
Austin K2/Y		2-ton ambulance	4x2	1940s	The Austin K2 was a British truck built by the Austin during World War II, approximately half of the 13,102 built were bodied as Austin K2/Y ambulances; it was the most widely used ambulance during the war with some being provided to the US military as well as the militaries of France, Norway and Russia.
Autocar U7144T		4–5-ton semi-tractor	4x4	1941	Produced by Autocar as a semi-tractor intended to tow a 6-ton trailer or 2000-gallon fuel-servicing trailer; 13,856 were produced during World War II.
Autocar U8144T		5–6-ton semi-tractor	4x4	1941	Produced by Autocar as a semi-tractor intended to tow bridging equipment semi-trailers; 2,700 were produced during World War II. Additionally, 607 were produced with van bodies during the war as the K-30 and K-31 trucks.
Caledon Model B		3-ton truck	4x2	1917	Caledon Motors of Glasgow were originally a distributor of Commer vehicles but from 1914 experienced difficulties being supplied, so they started building their own lorries. Powered by a W.H. Dorman & Co engine, around 300 of their 3-ton Model Bs were purchased by the British War Office, 40 of which were supplied to the American Expeditionary Forces and 50 were supplied to Imperial Russia.
Caterpillar M520 series 'Goer'		8-ton truck	4x4	1972	An articulated, amphibious 8-ton truck produced by Caterpillar, 1,300 vehicles were produced.
Chevrolet G506		1 1/2-ton truck	4x4	1940	The US Army's standard 1 1/2-ton truck during World War II, it was produced by Chevrolet; 168,603 were produced during the war. A large number of variants were produced including some with a fifth-wheel, the majority were produced with a steel cargo body.
Commer RC		3-ton truck	4x2	1917	British truck built by Commer that was supplied by the British to the American Expeditionary Forces in France during World War I.
Dennis A Type		3-ton truck	4x2	1917	British truck built by Dennis Brothers that was supplied to the American Expeditionary Forces in France during World War I.
Diamond T 4-ton truck		4-ton truck	6x6	1940	The US Army's standard 4-ton truck during World War II, it was produced by Diamond T; almost 31,500 were produced during the war in two wheelbase lengths and with a number of bodies.
Diamond T 980		Tank transporter	6x4	1941	Designed to meet a British Army requirement, it was subsequently adopted by the US Army as a "substitute standard" tank transporter during World War II; approximately 6,500 were produced during the war of which 2,255 were purchased by the British.
Dodge T-234 'Burma truck'		3-ton truck	4x2	1944	
Foden 5-ton steam wagon		5-ton steam wagon	4x2	1917	Steam wagon built by Foden, 800 were in British military service by 1918, additionally the American Expeditionary Forces purchased a number from the British War Office.
Ford GTB 'Burma Jeep'		1 1/2-ton truck	4x4	1943	Developed as a low-profile, cab forward truck for the US Army Quartermaster Corps, it was produced by the Ford Motor Company; 15,274 were built seeing service with the US Army and US Navy during World War II.
Ford M656		5-ton truck	8x8	1968	Produced by Ford to meet an Army contract, it came in several versions including cargo, semi-tractor and van trucks; it was typically used to support the Pershing 1a missile.
FWD HAR-1		4-ton truck	4x4	1943	Produced by FWD during World War II, many were purchased by Canada and in 1943 the US Army placed an order and between 7,000 and 9,000 were produced for them, although most of these were supplied to allies under Lend-Lease as it was a non-standardized type with little inter-changeability of parts with other trucks in US service.
FWD Model B		3-ton truck	4x4	1916	Produced by FWD, it entered service with the US Army in 1916 and some were used on the Pancho Villa Expedition into Mexico. Over 16,000 were supplied to the US Army with many being sent to Europe during World War I.
FWD SU-COE		5–6-ton truck	4x4	1944	Produced by FWD during World War II, most of the chassis produced were supplied to Britain under Lend-Lease or Canada where they were used as general cargo trucks, artillery tractors and snowplows, although some short-wheelbase versions with open caps were used by the USMC as artillery tractors.
Garford Model 70		2-ton truck	4x2	1917	Produced by the Garford Motor Truck Co of Ohio, upon America's entry into the First World War the US Quartermaster Corps placed an order for 5,010 Garford Model 70s. Garford delivered 1,010 Model 70s before the end of the war, of which 499 had arrived in France before the Armistice.
GMC CCKW 'Jimmy'		2 1/2-ton truck	6x6	1941	One of the most significant trucks of World War II, it was a 2½-ton 6×6 truck produced by Yellow Truck and Coach Co a subsidiary of General Motors Company (GMC); 562,750 were produced in different chassis lengths and many body styles.
GMC M135		2 1/2-ton truck	6x6	1950s	A 2½-ton 6×6 truck produced by General Motors Company in the 1950s, it was an evolution of and intended to replace the ageing GMC CCKW, although the REO M35 was the military's standardized CCKW replacement.
International M-5H-6		2 1/2-ton truck	6x6	1941	Produced by International Harvester it was the USMC's standard 2½-ton 6×6 truck during World War II; around 40,000 were produced in two chassis lengths and several body styles, some were also supplied to the US Navy and the Soviet Union.
International M425/426		5-ton semi-tractor	4x2	1944	Produced by International Harvester although production was also sub-contracted to Kenworth and Marmon-Herrington, it was a semi-tractor used during World War II primarily for long distance supply routes such as the Red Ball Express; 15,618 were produced.
International M39 series		5-ton truck	6x6	1950	A 5-ton 6×6 truck produced during the Cold War.
Jeffery Quad (Nash Quad)		1 1/2-ton truck	4x4	1916	Produced by Jeffery and later by Nash, it was introduced into US Army service in time for the 1916 Pancho Villa Expedition into Mexico. Over 11,500 saw military service, the model was extensively used during World War I.
Karrier WDS		3-ton truck	4x2	1917–18	Produced by British firm Karrier of Huddersfield, the WDS was a 3-ton British War Office type. 1,738 were in British service in 1918, additionally some were supplied to the American Expeditionary Forces.
Liberty truck		3–5-ton truck	4x2	1918	Designed in 1917 to meet the demands of the US forces participating in World War I, 9,452 were produced during the war by a number of manufacturers.
Locomobile Model A		5-ton truck	4x2	1912-14	Produced by the Locomobile Company of America, at least 40 were purchased by the US Army Corps of Engineers. Fitted with tipping bodies, they were used by them for several large construction projects.
Locomobile-Riker Model B		3-ton truck	4x2	1916	Produced by the Locomobile Company of America, it was first used by the US Army during the Pancho Villa Expedition, and a further 1,690 were delivered during the First World War.
M1 wrecker		10-ton recovery truck	6x6	1943	Produced by Ward LaFrance and Kenworth, it was the US Army's standard heavy recovery truck during World War II; 5,735 were produced during the war.
M900 series		Semi-tractors / dump trucks / other types	6x4 / 6x6 / 8x6	1978	A series of trucks based on commercial truck models with minimal modifications to make them suitable for military service, they include M915 series of 14-ton 6x4 semi-tractors built by AM General and later Freightliner, the M916 20-ton 6x6 semi-tractors built by Freightliner, the M917 dump trucks initially Freightliner 18.5-ton 8x6 vehicles and later Mack 27-ton 8x8 vehicles, and the M918 bitumen spreader, M919 8x6 concrete mixer and M920 20-ton 8x6 semi-tractors all built by Freightliner.
Mack AC		3 1/2–7 1/2-ton truck	4x2	1916	Produced by Mack, approximately 4,500 were delivered to the US government in 3 1/2, 5 1/2 and 7 1/2-ton versions, it saw extensive service during World War I.
Mack EH		5-ton truck	4x2	1943	
Mack M123 / M125		10-ton truck / tank transporter	6x6	1955	A heavy truck produced by Mack during the Cold War, the M123 was a tank transport prime mover whilst the M125 was primarily used as an artillery tractor.
Mack NJU		5–6-ton semi-tractor	4x4	1941	Produced by Mack during World War II, it was a semi-tractor primarily used to pontoon trailers; 692 were produced.
Mack NM		6-ton truck	6x6	1940	Produced by Mack, it was a non-standard 6-ton 6x6 truck during World War II; 7,436 were produced in seven different models.
Mack NO		7 1/2-ton truck	6x6	1941	Produced by Mack as an artillery tractor for the 155 mm gun M1, 8 inch Howitzer M1 and 240 mm howitzer M1 during World War II, longer wheelbase versions were made as heavy recovery trucks. 2,050 were produced during the war.
Militor truck		3-ton truck	4x4	1918	Designed by the Ordnance Department as a standardized four-wheel drive 3-ton truck and artillery tractor, produced by the Militor corporation with the end World War I orders were cancelled after either 75 or 150 were built; those built were issued to the Artillery Corps.
Oshkosh HEMTT		10-ton truck	8x8	1982	Produced by Oshkosh it is the US Army's standard heavy truck; as of September 2020 an estimated 35,800 had been built.
Oshkosh LVS		10–12 1/2-ton truck	8x8	1985	Produced by Oshkosh, it is a heavy, articulating truck operated by the USMC; 3,754 were built in several variants.
Oshkosh LVSR		16 1/2-ton truck	10x10	2009	Produced by Oshkosh, it is a heavy truck designed to replace the Oshkosh LVS in USMC service; 2,020 have been delivered to the USMC.
Oshkosh M911		Tank transporter	8x6 / 6x6	1976	A tank transporter produced by Oshkosh; at least 1,722 were produced.
Oshkosh M1070		Tank transporter	8x8	1992	A tank transporter produced by Oshkosh that is capable of transporting the M1 Abrams.
Oshkosh MTVR		7-ton truck	6x6	2001	A family trucks produced by Oshkosh that are designed to replace the remaining 5-ton 6×6 trucks in USMC service.
Oshkosh PLS		16 1/2-ton truck	10x10	1993	A family heavy trucks produced by Oshkosh to supplement the HEMTT in the US Army.
Pacific TR1 'Dragon Wagon'		Tank transporter	6x6	1943	Produced by the Pacific Car & Foundry Co. as a more capable tank transporter than the Diamond T 980; 1,372 were produced during World War II.
Packard Model 1½D		1 1/2-ton truck	4x2	1917–18	Produced by Packard and used during World War I, 526 were sent to Europe with the American Expeditionary Forces.
Packard Model 3D		3-ton truck	4x2	1916–18	Produced by Packard and used during World War I, 4,856 were delivered by November 1918, 3,479 of which were sent to Europe with the American Expeditionary Forces.
Peerless TC4		3-ton lorry	4x2	1917–18	Produced by Peerless, over 10,000 TC4's were purchased by the British War Office during the First World War, making it the most numerous lorry model in the service of British Empire's militaries in the conflict. Small numbers were also used by the American Expeditionary Forces during the war.
Pierce-Arrow Model X		2-ton truck	4x2	1917	Produced by Pierce-Arrow Motor Car Company; it was used by the US Army during World War I.
REO M35		2 1/2-ton truck	6x6	1950	A family of 2½-ton 6×6 trucks developed by REO and built several manufacturers; by 1980 more than 150,000 had been produced.
Standard Motor Truck Co 2½ ton		2 1/2-ton truck	4x2	1917	Truck produced by the Standard Motor Truck Co of Detroit, the US Army purchased an unspecified number of their chain-driven 2 1/2-ton trucks, destined for the Spruce Production Division.
Standard Motor Truck Co 3½ ton		3 1/2-ton truck	4x2	1917	Larger model truck produced by the Standard Motor Truck Co of Detroit, the US Army purchased 287 of their chain-driven 3 1/2-ton trucks, destined for the Spruce Production Division.
Stewart & Stevenson FMTV		2 1/2–5-ton truck	4x4 / 6x6	1996	Originally produced by Stewart & Stevenson to replace the aging 2 1/2-ton and 5-ton trucks in the US inventory it is produced in two basic variants, the 4x4 Light Medium Tactical Vehicle (LMTV) which was initially rated for 2 1/2-ton payloads and the 6x6 Medium Tactical Vehicle (MTV) which was initially rated for 5-ton payloads.
Studebaker US6		2 1/2-ton truck	6x6	1941	A 2½-ton 6×6 truck produced by Studebaker, it was similar to the GMC CCKW; over 200,000 were produced during World War II including 8,640 6x4 semi-tractors rated for 5-ton loads.
White truck		1–3-ton trucks	4x2	1917	Produced by White Motor Company, 1 to 3-ton White trucks were standardized by the US Army during World War I and over 18,000 were delivered; they were also used by the militaries of Britain, Canada, France and Russia.

== Tractors and specialist carriers ==
Name	Image	Class	Drive	Service entry	Notes
Dennis N Type		Fire engine	4x2	1917	Fire engine produced by British firm Dennis Brothers, a number were used by the American Expeditionary Forces in France during the First World War.
GMC DUKW 'Duck'		2 1/2-ton amphibian	6x6	1942	Produced by GMC's Yellow Truck and Coach Co during World War II, it combined then cab forward version of the GMC CCKW (the AFKWX) with a steel hull to produce a 2 1/2-ton amphibious truck; 21,147 were produced.
Holt 45		Tractor	Tracked	1917	Commercial tracked tractor produced by Holt which was used by both the US Army and the USMC during the First World War to tow medium artillery pieces such as the 155 mm Schneider model 1917 howitzer, as well as to tow stores. Initially the US military ordered 1,800 Holt 45s, but the 45 was supplanted in production by specially designed models.
Holt 75		Tractor	Half-track	1916	Commercial tracked tractor produced by Holt that saw widespread service with the militaries of the British Empire during the First World War. 267 were purchased for service with the US military as both an artillery tractor and for resupply, a number were used during the Pancho Villa Expedition and 232 were sent to France for service with the American Expeditionary Forces.
Holt 120		Tractor	Half-track	1917	Designed by Holt in response to a request from the US government for a heavy artillery tractor, 433 Holt 120s were delivered to the US military. In service it was found to be less effective than the smaller Holt 75.
LARC-V		5-ton amphibian	4x4	1963	Developed as an amphibious transport; approximately 950 were built and as of May 2020 38 remained in US service.
LARC-XV		15-ton amphibian	4x4	1960	An amphibious transport developed to transport non-mobile general cargo and lighter mobile cargo from ship to shore, across the beach and over roads.
LARC-LX		60-ton amphibian	4x4	1952	The first of LARC family of amphibious transports to be produced, it was developed to transport heavy and bulky equipment from ship to shore and across unimproved beaches.
Latil TAR		Artillery tractor	4x4	1917–18	Four-wheel drive artillery tractor produced by Latil, it was used by the French Army during the First World War to tow heavy artillery pieces such as the Canon de 155 mm GPF. During the conflict a number also were also supplied to the American Expeditionary Forces.
Latil TP		Balloon winch truck	4x4	1917–18	Four-wheel drive artillery tractor produced by Latil, it was used by the French Army during the First World War as a light artillery tractor and portée. During the conflict 50 were supplied to the US Army Balloon Service of the American Expeditionary Forces fitted as balloon winch trucks, and a further 15 fitted as support trucks carrying specialist equipment used by the Balloon Service.
M1 heavy tractor		Tractor	Tracked	1940s	A blanket designation for several commercially produced tracked tractor models that were used during World War II.
M1 light tractor		Tractor	Tracked	1941	A blanket designation for several commercially produced tracked tractor models that were used during World War II to tow a variety of loads, they were usually used to as a general engineer tractor.
M1 medium tractor		Tractor	Tracked	1940s	A blanket designation for several commercially produced tracked tractor models that were used during World War II.
M2 high-speed tractor		Tractor	Tracked	1941	Produced during World War II to tow heavy bomber aircraft around airfields.
M2 light tractor		Tractor	Tracked	1940s	
M4 high-speed tractor		Artillery tractor	Tracked	1943	Produced as an artillery tractor during World War II, it was used to tow the 90 mm AA Gun M1, 155 mm gun M1, 8 inch Howitzer M1 and 240 mm howitzer M1.
M5 high-speed tractor		Artillery tractor	Tracked	1942	Produced as an artillery tractor during World War II, it was used to tow the 105 mm Howitzer M2, 4.5-inch gun M1 and 155 mm Howitzer M1.
M6 high-speed tractor		Artillery tractor	Tracked	1944	Produced as an artillery tractor during World War II, it was used to tow the 120 mm AA Gun M1, 8-inch gun M1 and 240 mm howitzer M1.
M7 snow tractor		Snow tractor	Half-track	1943	Produced during World War II to carry small loads over snow-covered terrain, it shared many components from the Willys MB and a ski-mounted trailer.
M8 high-speed tractor		Artillery tractor	Tracked	1950	Heavy artillery tractor used by the US Army and USMC.
M29 Weasel		Load carrier	Tracked	1943	Produced during World War II as a specialist cargo carrier for snow-covered terrain, it was initially produced as the M28, then the improved M29 and finally the amphibious M29C.
M76 Otter		1 1/2-ton load carrier	Tracked	1950s	Developed by Pontiac, it was a lightweight amphibious cargo carrier designed to have a greater payload than the M29 Weasel; initially tested by the US Army it was adopted by the USMC.
M116 Husky		1 1/2-ton load carrier	Tracked	1960	Designed by Pacific Car & Foundry and built by Blaw-Knox, it was a lightweight amphibious cargo carrier designed to replace the M29 Weasel and the M76 Otter; 197 were built for the USMC.
M973 SUSV		Load carrier	Tracked	1983	Developed by Hägglund & Söner it is a version of the Bandvagn 206; approximately 1,100 have been purchased by the US Army and predominantly issued to the Alaska-based 172nd Infantry Brigade and the Alaska Army National Guard.
Renault EG		Artillery tractor	4x4	1917–18	Four-wheel drive artillery tractor produced by Renault, it was used by the French Army during the First World War to tow heavy artillery pieces such as the Canon de 155 mm GPF. During the conflict a number also were also supplied to the American Expeditionary Forces.

== See also ==
- List of land vehicles of the U.S. Armed Forces
- List of currently active United States military land vehicles
- List of vehicles of the United States Marine Corps
