= Leyland RAF Type =

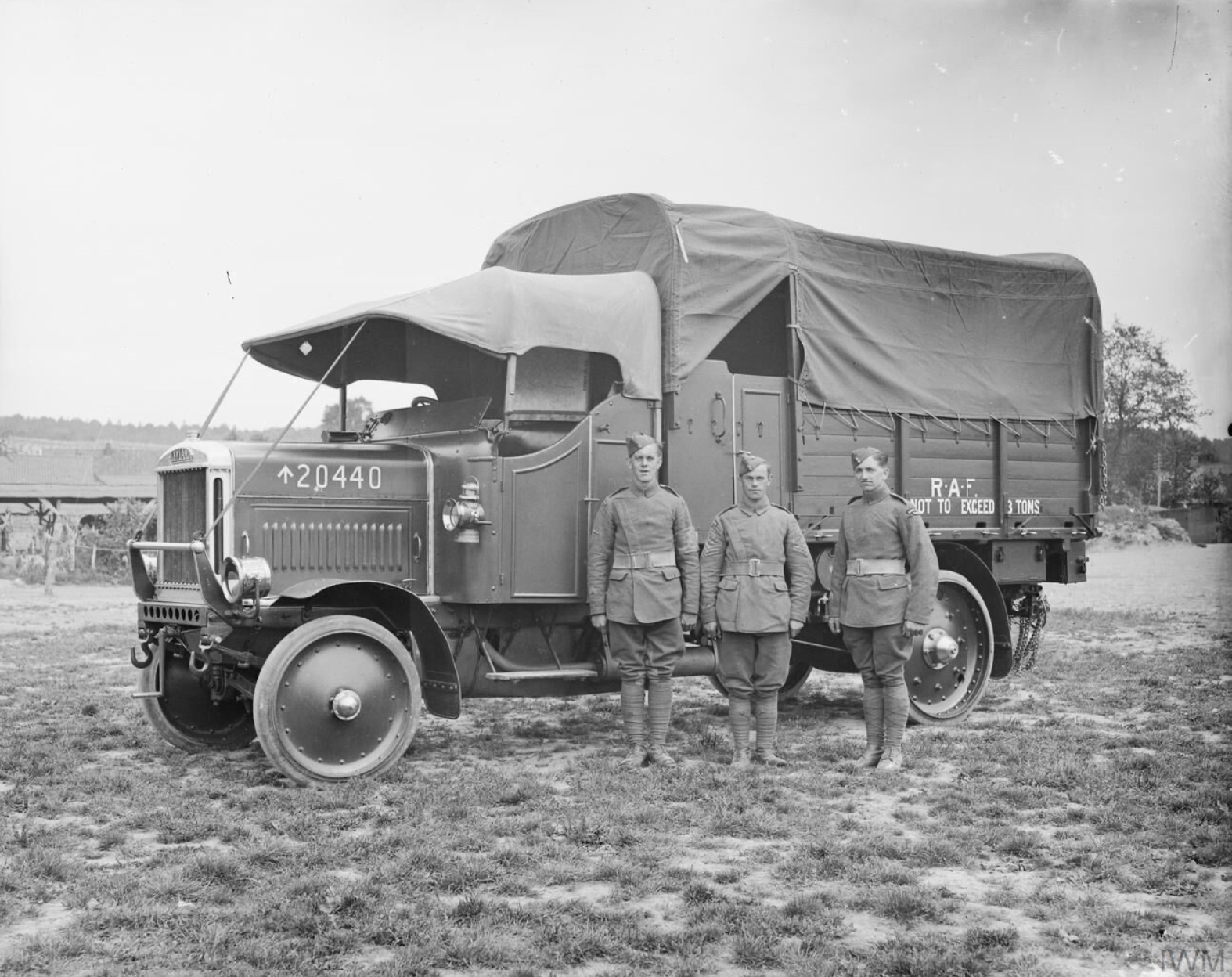
- Type: 3-ton lorry
- Place of origin: United Kingdom

Service history
- Used by: British Empire; Republic of Ireland
- Wars: First World War

Production history
- Manufacturer: Leyland Motors
- Produced: 1912–1926
- No. built: 6411 in service in 1918
- Variants: S4X4 & S5X4

Specifications (S4X4)
- Mass: 4.45 long tons (4.52 t)
- Length: 21 ft 5 in (6.53 m) total 13 ft 10 1/2 in (4.23 m) wheelbase
- Width: 7 ft 4 in (2.24 m)
- Height: 9 ft 1 in (2.77 m)
- Engine: Leyland inline 4-cylinder 316 cu in (5.18 L) side-valve petrol 36 bhp (27 kW)
- Drive: 4x2
- Transmission: 4 Forward, 1 Reverse gear
- Suspension: Semi-elliptical leaf springs
- Maximum speed: 18 mph (29 km/h)
- References: Barnes, Vanderveen & Ware

The Leyland RAF Type lorry, also known as the Leyland Subsidy A Type, was a British lorry built by the Leyland Motors in the 1910s, that saw widespread service with militaries of the British Empire during the First World War. It became especially associated with the Royal Flying Corps and its successor service the Royal Air Force, after the war large numbers were reconditioned by Leyland and marketed to the public as the "RAF Type".

== Design ==
The RAF Type was a cab behind engine, rear-wheel drive lorry, it was developed from the 4-ton Leyland S Class. In military service the RAF Type had a payload capacity of 3 long tons (3.05 t), although in civilian service it had an increased payload capacity of 4 long tons (4.06 t). (Note: In First World War British military service, trucks with a civilian payload capacity of 4 to 5 long tons (4.06 to 5.08 t) frequently had a military payload rating of 3 long tons (3.05 t). This was due to a variety of reasons including the rigours of military operations, the propensity for drivers to overload the vehicles, and commercial trucks not needing to account for a crew of three and all of their kit.) The lorry measured 21 ft 5 in (6.53 m) in overall length, 7 ft 4 in (2.24 m) in width and 9 ft 1 in (2.77 m) in height, with a wheelbase of 13 ft 10 1/2 in (4.23 m).

Mechanically, early RAF Types were powered by a 4-cylinder inline side valve petrol engine, which produced 30 hp (22 kW) (some sources claim 32 hp (24 kW)). From 1914 it was powered by a larger 316 cu in (5.18 L) 4-cylinder inline side valve petrol engine that produced 36 hp (27 kW). The lorry was driven through a four-speed transmission to a live rear axle. Most were equipped with pressed steel disk wheels fitted with solid rubber tyres.

The RAF Type was produced in a variety of body types including GS (general service) cargo, workshop, fuel tanker and balloon vehicles.

== History ==
In 1911, the British War Office revised the terms of their motor vehicle "subsidy scheme", which sought to subsidise commercial truck operators to purchase vehicles that were suitable for military service on the condition the War Office could impress them into service in the event of a national emergency. The first subsidy scheme trials were held in 1912, where lorry manufacturers could register their vehicles for subsidy status. During these trials, Leyland became the first manufacturer to be granted subsidy certification for the Subsidy A Type, as well as their 30 cwt (1 1/2 ton) Subsidy B Type lorry.

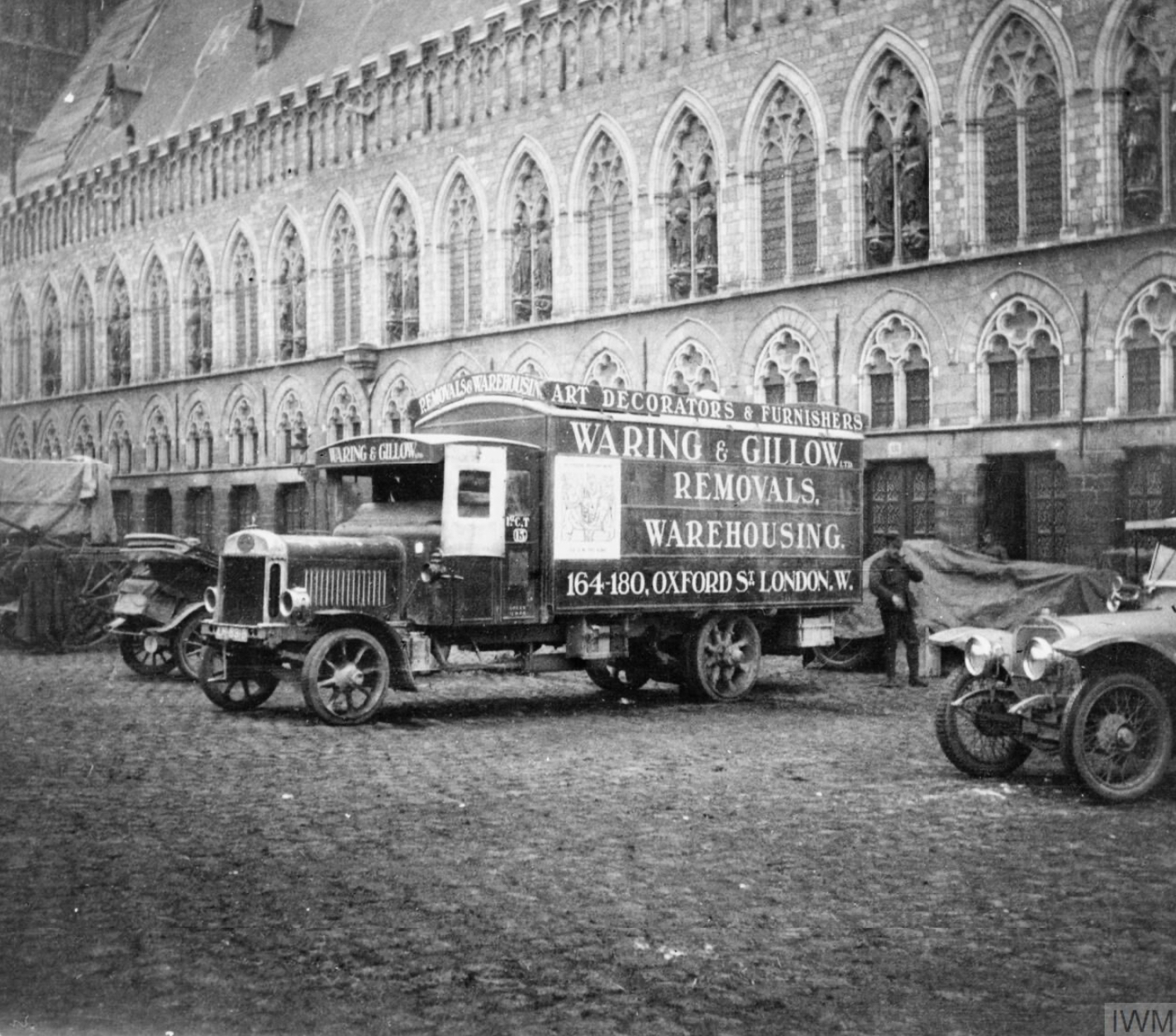
Impressed Waring & Gillow lorry, Ypres, October 1914

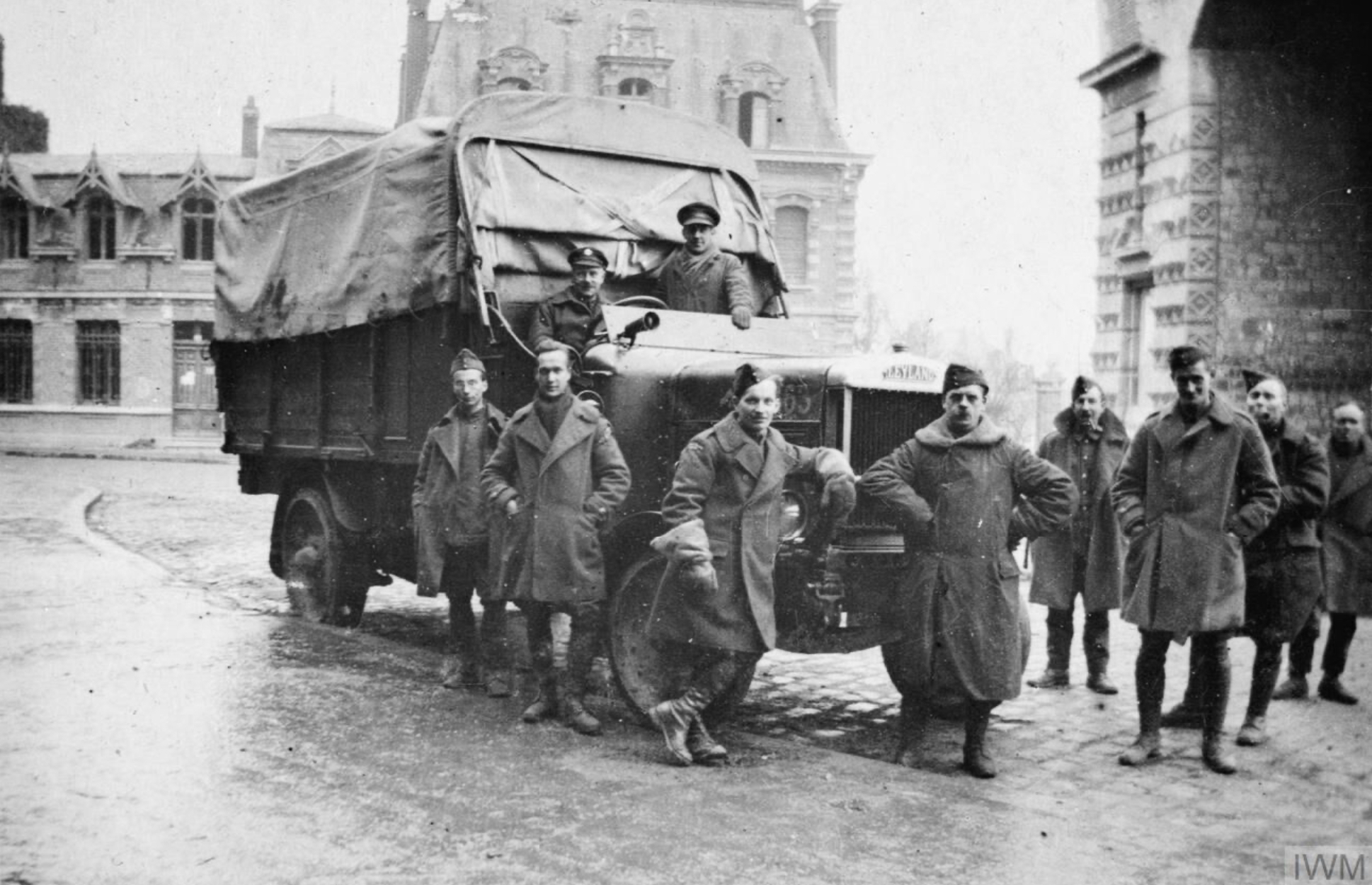
RFC personnel with a Leyland 3-ton lorry, Cambrai, November 1918

On the outbreak of war in 1914, the War Office duly impressed all subsidy lorries into service, one large civilian operator of Leyland RAF Types was the London store Waring & Gillow. Their transport department, including nine RAF Typess, was sent to Avonmouth Docks where it formed an entire Army Service Corps company. Upon their arrival in France, the Waring's lorries operated for several weeks with their company colours and an "Army Service Corps" sticker, before they were repainted in military livery.

During the war, Leyland lorries became particularly associated with the Royal Flying Corps and its successor service the Royal Air Force, as well as the Flying Corps of other militaries of the British Empire. The RAF Type was Leyland's most produced model during the war. In military service the RAF Type was found to be reliable, rugged and hard wearing, in addition to serving with the Royal Flying Corps the RAF Type was also used by the wider British Army. By 1918 there were 5,932 RAF Types in military service, 4,721 of which were operated by the Royal Flying Corps / Royal Air Force.

After the war, the British government announced it would auction off a large portion of its military vehicle fleet. Recognising this would flood the market and suppress demand for newly built lorries, Leyland took the decision to purchase back as many of their lorries as they could, and recondition them for subsequent resale. This they believed would also protect the Leyland brand, by preventing large numbers of their lorries being on the roads that were in very poor condition after years of war service. In order to undertake this work, in 1919 Leyland purchased a former aircraft factory in Kingston upon Thames that had been operated by Sopwith during the war. Between 1919 and 1926 these reconditioned ex-military RAF Types were marketed as the Leyland "RAF Type", the name they became known by. They were rated at 4 tons and were sold with a 6 month warranty. Records indicate that 2,904 reconditioned RAF Types were sold to civilian customers, 107 were resold as they were without being reconditioned, 64 were broken up as scrap, 25 were dismantled and rebuild from spare parts with new engines and 10 were reconditioned and retained by Leyland as company vehicles. One reconditioned RAF Type was purchased by Chivers and Sons of Cambridge in 1919, initially fitted with a box body it was used for deliveries in London, then by the company at their factory in Histon, during the Second World War it was used by the company's fire brigade, and after the war it was used on the Chivers farms until 1959 when it was restored and subsequently presented to the Historic Commercial Vehicle Club.

In the 1920s, the British government also gifted a large number of RAF Types to the newly established Republic of Ireland.
