= Wolseley CR =

British First World War military lorry

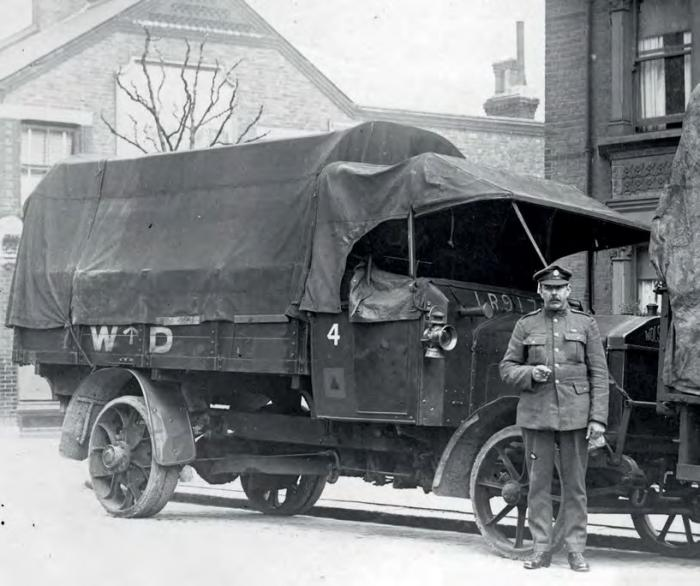
- Type: 3 1/2-ton lorry
- Place of origin: United Kingdom

Service history
- Used by: British Empire
- Wars: First World War

Production history
- Manufacturer: Wolseley Motors
- Produced: 1913–1915
- No. built: 385

Specifications (WD Pattern)
- Mass: 2 3/4 long tons (2.8 t) bare chassis
- Length: 21 ft 6 in (6.55 m) total 13 ft 9 in (4.19 m) wheelbase
- Width: 7 ft 2 in (2.18 m)
- Height: 11 ft 10 in (3.61 m)
- Crew: 1
- Passengers: 2
- Engine: Vickers 8,522 cc (520 cu in); 4-cylinder petrol 34.2 bhp (25.5 kW) at 1,000 rpm
- Payload capacity: 3 long tons (3.05 t) (Note: In First World War British military service, lorries with a civilian payload capacity of 4 to 5 long tons (4.5 to 5.6 short tons; 4.1 to 5.1 t) frequently had a military payload rating of 3 long tons (3.4 short tons; 3.0 t). This was due to a variety of reasons including the rigours of military operations, the propensity for drivers to overload the vehicles, and commercial trucks not needing to account for a crew of three and all of their kit.)
- Drive: 4x2
- Transmission: 4-forward, 1-reverse
- Suspension: Leaf springs
- References: Ellis, Gosling, Jenkinson, Vanderveen and Ware

The Wolseley CR was a British lorry produced by the Wolseley Motors in the 1910s that saw service with the militaries of the British Empire during the First World War. Only 385 were produced by Wolseley, with production ending in 1915 to permit the company to produce other materiel for the war effort.

== Design ==
The Wolseley CR was a cab behind engine, rear-wheel-drive truck, it had a 13 ft 9 in (4.19 m) wheelbase, a bare chassis weight of 2 3/4 long tons (2.8 t), and was built for payloads of 3 1/2 long tons (3.56 t). The CR's chassis was made from pressed steel, which sloped down at the front to allow greater access to the engine; this feature also afforded improved visibility for the driver. The British Army's WD Pattern CRs were 21 ft 6 in (6.55 m) total length, 7 ft 2 in (2.18 m) wide, and 11 ft 10 in (3.61 m) total height. The CR's open cabin had three seats for a driver and two passengers.

The CR was powered by 4-cylinder inline petrol engine produced by Vickers with a bore and stroke of 117 mm × 130 mm (4.6 in × 5.1 in) and 8,522 cc (520 cu in) displacement, it was governed at 1,000 rpm at which it produced 34.2 bhp (25.5 kW). The engine was fitted with a Bosch water tight ignition and a Wolseley patent 'constant depression' carburetter which maintained the quality of fuel mixture at all speeds. The CR was fitted with a leather faced cone-type clutch and driven through a four-speed transmission with double reduction gearing. It had a worm final drive rear axle, front and rear leaf spring suspension, and rear wheel drum brakes. The CR's wheel were stele l spoked with solid tyres, with twin-wheels on the rear.

== History ==
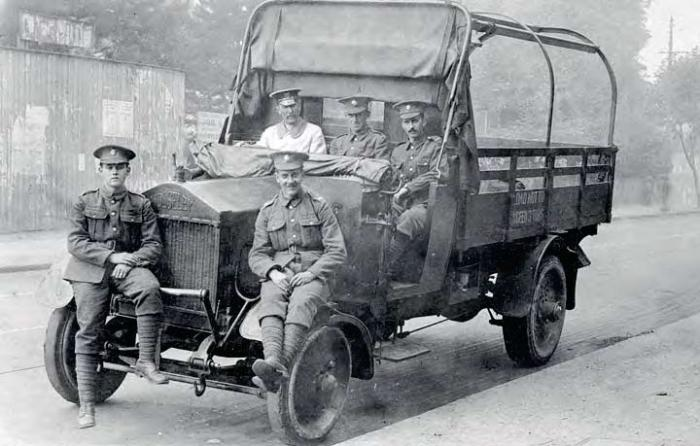
Wolseley CR in British Army service

The Wolseley CR was first exhibited at the 1913 Commercial Vehicle Show at the Olympia Exhibition Centre, having been designed by Wolseley to comply with the War Office motor vehicle "subsidy scheme" requirements. (Note: In 1911, the British War Office revised the terms of their motor vehicle "subsidy scheme", which sought to subsidise commercial truck operators to purchase vehicles that were suitable for military service on the condition the War Office could impress them into service in the event of a national emergency.) In October that year, the CR was participated in the War Office trials at Farnborough for registration under the scheme; Wolseley's CL, a 30-cwt lorry, also participated in the trials. The trials involved driving to Farnborough from the Wolseley factory in Birmingham, a series of timed road runs, hill climbs and a 3-hour speed trial at Brooklands. At the end of the trials, the CR and the CL were accepted for certification under the scheme.

In military service, the Wolseley CR was rated for payloads of 3 long tons (3.05 t). Wolseley produced the CR until 1915, when they discontinued production after building only 385 CRs, the fewest 3-ton lorries of the designs accepted under the War Office subsidy scheme. Wolesley had suspended production of the CR to concentrate on producing other materiel for Britain's war effort, including aircraft, aircraft engines, artillery shells, mortar bombs, ambulances, gun mounts, wire cutters, and gun sights. At the time of the Armistice in 1918, 353 CRs remained in British military service.

Only one Wolseley CR is known to remain today. Following the war, it was sold to a civilian buyer who converted it into a forward control caravan, and in 1964 it was restored back to military condition.
