= Dennis A Type =

1910s British lorry

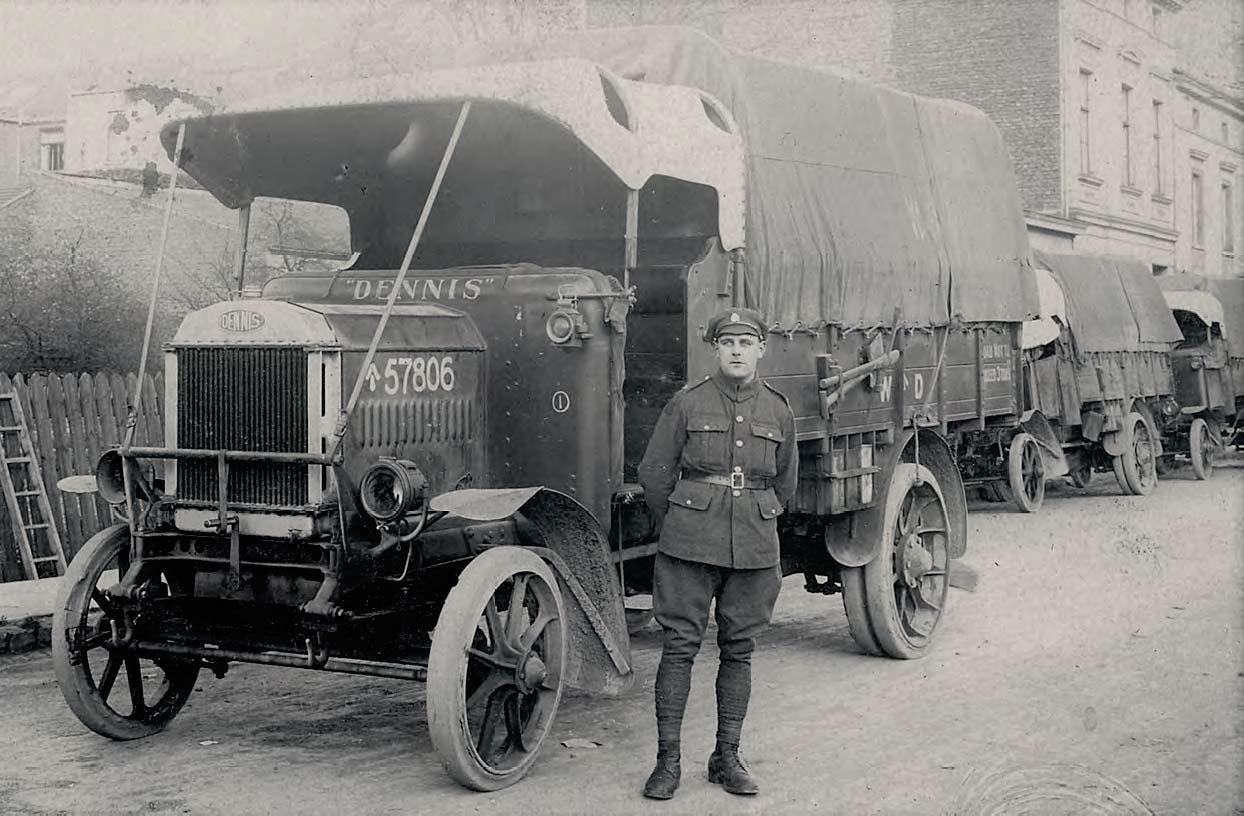
- Type: 3 1/2–4-ton lorry
- Place of origin: United Kingdom

Service history
- Used by: British Empire & United States
- Wars: First World War

Production history
- Manufacturer: Dennis Brothers
- Produced: 1913–1926
- No. built: > 7,000 (Note: Most sources state over 7,000 A Types were produced by Dennis and delivered to the War Office during the war. Although some sources state production was half that number, being approximately 3,500.)

Specifications (WD Pattern)
- Mass: 3.15 long tons (3.2 t) bare chassis
- Length: 20 ft 10 in (6.35 m) total 13 ft 2 in (4.01 m) wheelbase
- Width: 7 ft (2.13 m)
- Engine: White and Poppe 6,232 cc (380.3 cu in) 4-cylinder petrol 49.6 bhp (37.0 kW) (Note: The White and Poppe engine had a RAE horsepower rating of 40 bhp (30 kW) at 1,000 rpm.)
- Payload capacity: 3 long tons (3.05 t) (Note: In First World War British military service, lorries with a civilian payload capacity of 4 to 5 long tons (4.5 to 5.6 short tons; 4.1 to 5.1 t) frequently had a military payload rating of 3 long tons (3.4 short tons; 3.0 t). This was due to a variety of reasons including the rigours of military operations, the propensity for drivers to overload the vehicles, and commercial trucks not needing to account for a crew of three and all of their kit.)
- Drive: 4x2
- Transmission: 4-forward, 1-reverse
- Suspension: Semi-elliptical leaf springs
- Fuel capacity: 30 imp gal (140 L; 36 US gal)
- References: Pullen, Vanderveen, Commercial Vehicles of Great Britain Vol. 2, Gosling & Ware

The Dennis A Type, often called the Dennis War Office Subsidy Type, was a British lorry built by the Dennis Brothers in the 1910s that saw widespread service with the militaries of the British Empire during the First World War. Upon the United States' entry into the war, a number were also supplied to the American Expeditionary Forces in France.

== Design ==
The A Type was a cab behind engine, rear-wheel-drive truck with a payload capacity of 3 1/2–4 long tons (3.56–4.06 t), it had a chassis length of 13 ft 2 in (4.01 m) (Note: Some sources state the A Type had a 13 ft (3.96 m) chassis length.) and a gauge of 5 ft 6 in (1.68 m), the bare chassis weighed 3.15 long tons (3.2 t). British Army's WD Pattern A Types were 20 ft 10 in (6.35 m) total length and 7 ft (2.13 m) wide.

Initially the A Type was powered by a 30 bhp (22 kW) Aster petrol engine, but was found to be underpowered so it was replaced by a 40 bhp (30 kW) 4-cylinder inline engine produced by White and Poppe. The early White and Poppe engine had a bore and stroke of 110 mm × 150 mm (4.3 in × 5.9 in) and a 5,701 cc (347.9 cu in) displacement, later the engine bore was increased to 115 mm (4.5 in) increasing the displacement to 6,232 cc (380.3 cu in) and the power to 49.6 hp (37.0 kW). The A Type was driven through a four-speed transmission, leaf spring suspension, hand actuated drum brakes on the rear wheels and a foot actuated transmission brake. The A Type's worm final drive rear axle was considered particularly advanced for the period. It had a removable upper casing which contained the worm shaft, worm wheel, differential and bearings, all of which could be inspected and replaced without disturbing the chassis or removing the wheels. It had steel wheels fitted with solid rubber tyres, twin wheels at the rear.

== History ==
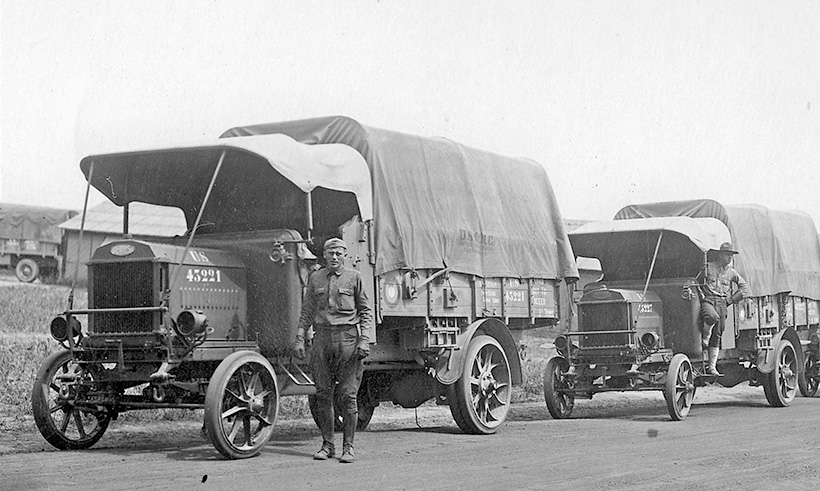
Convoy of A Type lorries of the Aviation Section, U.S. Signal Corps

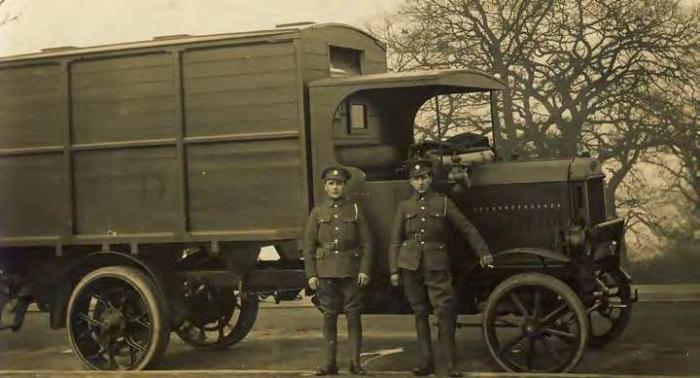
A Type of the British Army with stores body

Originally bicycle makers, in 1898 the Dennis brothers began motorising tricycles, in 1901 they produced their first motor car, in 1903 or 1904 they produced their first commercial vehicle and in 1908 they produced their first fire engine. In 1913 Dennis was listed as a public company and suspended production of passenger cars, instead concentrating on production of commercial vehicles including busses, fire engines and lorries.

That year Dennis introduced the A Type, first exhibiting it at the Commercial Vehicle Show at the Olympia Exhibition Centre. The A Type was designed by Dennis to comply with the War Office motor vehicle "subsidy scheme" requirements. (Note: In 1911, the British War Office revised the terms of their motor vehicle "subsidy scheme", which sought to subsidise commercial truck operators to purchase vehicles that were suitable for military service on the condition the War Office could impress them into service in the event of a national emergency.) In 1913 when the A Type was presented at a War Office trial for certification under the scheme, (Note: Subsidy scheme trials were held between 1912 and 1914, where lorry manufacturers could register their vehicles for subsidy status.) it failed, its original 30 bhp (22 kW) Aster engine being considered underpowered. Having re-engined the lorry with the more powerful White and Poppe engine, at the subsidy scheme trials held in early 1914 Dennis received certification for the A Type. The A Type was the last lorry to be certified before war was declared.

During the First World War, Dennis produced only two vehicle models, the A Type and the N Type fire engine. In 1915 the War Office took over direct control of Dennis for the duration of the War, and by the end of the conflict over 7,000 had been delivered. In military service, the Dennis A Type was found to have among the best performance of the British Subsidy Type lorries. Rated for payloads of 3 long tons (3.05 t), when fully loaded the A Type could climb gradients as steep as 1 in 6.

Upon their arrival in Europe in 1917, the British supplied the American Expeditionary Forces with a number of A Types. It is unknown how many A Types were supplied to the Americans, but it was likely hundreds.

Post-War, the British War Office auctioned off thousands of surplus military vehicles to the British public. Demobilised A Types proved popular with civilian operators. The A Type had considerable influence on post-War British lorry designs, and despite introducing new models, Dennis continued production of the A Type until 1926.

== Dennis-Stevens ==
Towards the end of the War, William Stevens of Tilling-Stevens parted company with Thomas Tilling, and joined Dennis. Stevens successfully mated his petrol-electric designs to the A Type, creating the Dennis-Stevens lorry. The War Office mounted large searchlights on the Dennis-Stevens, using the engine-driven generator to power the lamp. By the end of the War in 1918, 187 Dennis-Stevens searchlight carriers had been delivered to the War Office, 74 of which had been sent to France. After the War the Dennis-Stevens remained in production for some time as an easy to drive bus chassis.
