= Commer RC =

British lorry by Commer, 1910s and 1920s

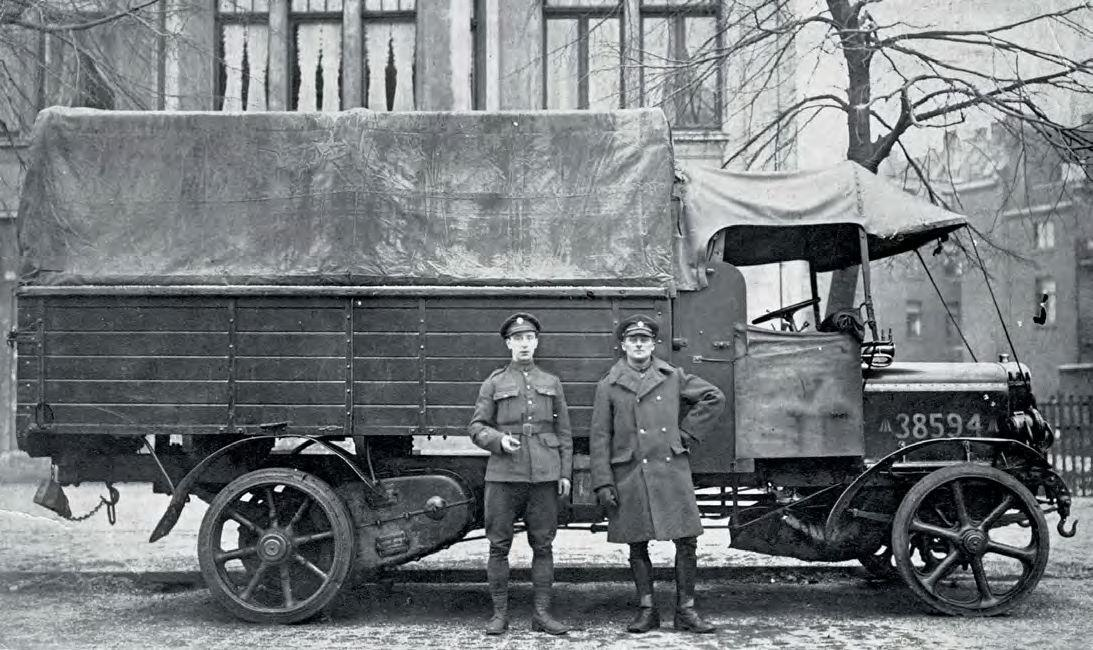
- Type: 3 1/2-ton lorry
- Place of origin: United Kingdom

Service history
- Used by: British Empire, Belgium, United States
- Wars: First World War

Production history
- Manufacturer: Commer
- Produced: 1907–1928

Specifications (WD Pattern)
- Mass: 3 1/2 long tons (3.56 t)
- Length: 20 ft 9 in (6.32 m) total 13 ft 3 in (4.04 m) wheelbase
- Width: 7 ft 3 in (2.21 m)
- Height: 10 ft 6 in (3.2 m)
- Engine: 5,322 cc (324.8 cu in) 4-cylinder petrol 40.6 bhp (30.3 kW) (Note: The engine had a RAE horsepower rating of 32 bhp (24 kW) at 1,000 rpm.)
- Payload capacity: 3 long tons (3.05 t)
- Drive: Chain driven 4x2
- Transmission: Lindley pre-selector 3-forward, 1-reverse
- Suspension: Semi-elliptical leaf springs
- References: Gosling, Vanderveen & Ware

The Commer RC was a British lorry built by Commer in the 1910s and 1920s. During the First World War the RC saw widespread service with the militaries of the British Empire, and some were also supplied to the Belgian Army and the American Expeditionary Forces.

== Design ==
The RC was a cab behind engine, rear-wheel-drive truck with a payload capacity of 3 1/2 long tons (3.56 t). The British Army's wartime RCs had a chassis length of 13 ft 3 in (4.04 m) (Note: Post-war the RC was marketed with a 12 ft 9 in (3.89 m) chassis length.) were 20 ft 9 in (6.32 m) total length, 7 ft 4 in (2.24 m) wide and 10 ft 6 in (3.20 m) in height.

The RC was powered by a 4-cylinder inline petrol engine with a bore and stroke of 110 mm × 140 mm (4.3 in × 5.5 in) and 5,322 cc (324.8 cu in) displacement, the engine produced 40.6 hp (30.3 kW). The RC was driven through a three-speed Lindley pre-selector transmission to double chain driven rear wheels. The RC's drive chains were enclosed in aluminium cases to prevent them from picking up debris which caused wear and reduce noise levels, but in service these cases were found to be awkward to remove and very susceptible to damage. The RC was fitted with front and rear semi-elliptical leaf spring suspension, rear wheel drum brakes and steel wheels fitted with solid rubber tyres, twin wheels at the rear.

== History ==
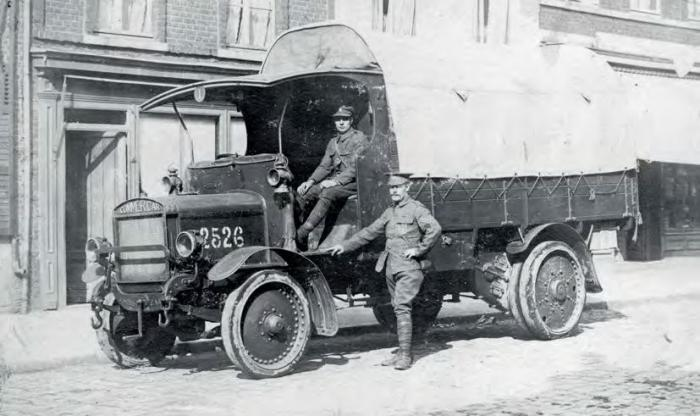
Commer RC with disc steel wheels

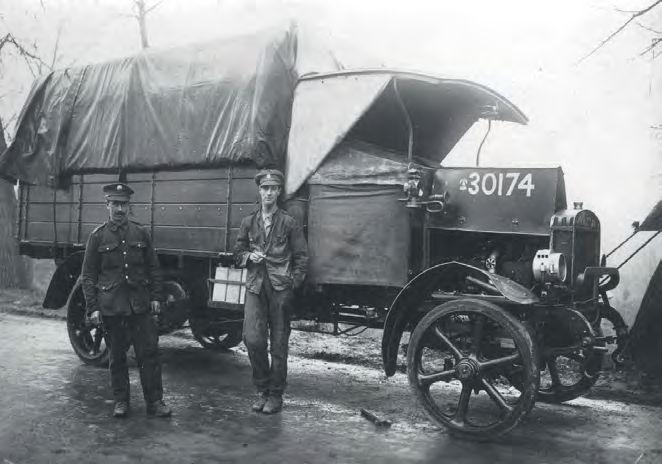
Commer RC showing its weather protection, a cab roof, side screens, canvas door and apron

The Commer company, originally called Commercial Cars Limited, was founded in 1905 intending to build easy to drive commercial vehicles, and the following year a factory was opened in Luton. In 1907 the company introduced the 3 1/2-ton RC, that same year the RC was awarded the silver medal in the 3-ton class in the Royal Automobile Club Commercial Vehicle Trials. A key feature of the RC was the Lindley pre-selector transmission, invented by engineer Charles Linley the transmission was incredibly advanced for the time and made gear changes easier and smoother. By 1911 the company had extended its range of commercial vehicles, with seven truck models of 1 to 7-ton payload capacities and three bus models, each were assigned a two letter model code such as BC, WP and PC, although it is unclear how these designations were selected.

Because of the pre-selector transmission, Commer's unique arrangement of the vehicle controls and its chain drive, the RC did not comply with the requirements of the 1911 War Office motor vehicle "subsidy scheme". (Note: In 1911, the British War Office introduced a motor vehicle "subsidy scheme", which sought to subsidise commercial truck operators to purchase vehicles that were suitable for military service on the condition the War Office could impress them into service in the event of a national emergency. To be suitable for registration under the scheme, the vehicle had to comply with a strict list of criteria of standardised controls and features.) In order to produce a lorry eligible for the scheme, in 1913 Commer produced a completely new 3-ton model, the "Subsidy A Type", which had a new transmission, a worm driven rear axle and compliant controls, and in July 1914 it was accepted for subsidy registration. However with the outbreak of the First World War Commer was directed to concentrate production of the proven RC instead of the new model.

During the War, Commer produced over 3,000 RCs and they saw widespread service with the militaries of the British Empire, including the Australian, British and Canadian armies. In military service, the pre-selector transmission was found to be challenging for unfamiliar drivers, so those assigned to drive the RC were sent on a week-long familiarisation course at Bulford to learn how to drive the type. Additionally, specific transport companies were assigned Commer lorries instead of a mixing them with other lorry types. At the time of the Armistice in 1918, 2,303 RCs remained in the service of the British Empire. During the War, the British also provided RCs to the Belgian Army, and upon the United States' entry into the war some were also supplied to the American Expeditionary Forces in France.

Post-war the RC a remained in production until 1926, despite being dated towards the end. After the conflict Commer was hard hit by the market being flooded with ex-military lorries, in 1922 a receiver was appointed and in 1926 the company was purchased by Humber, at which time a new 4 1/2-ton lorry replaced the RC.
