= Foden 5-ton steam wagon =

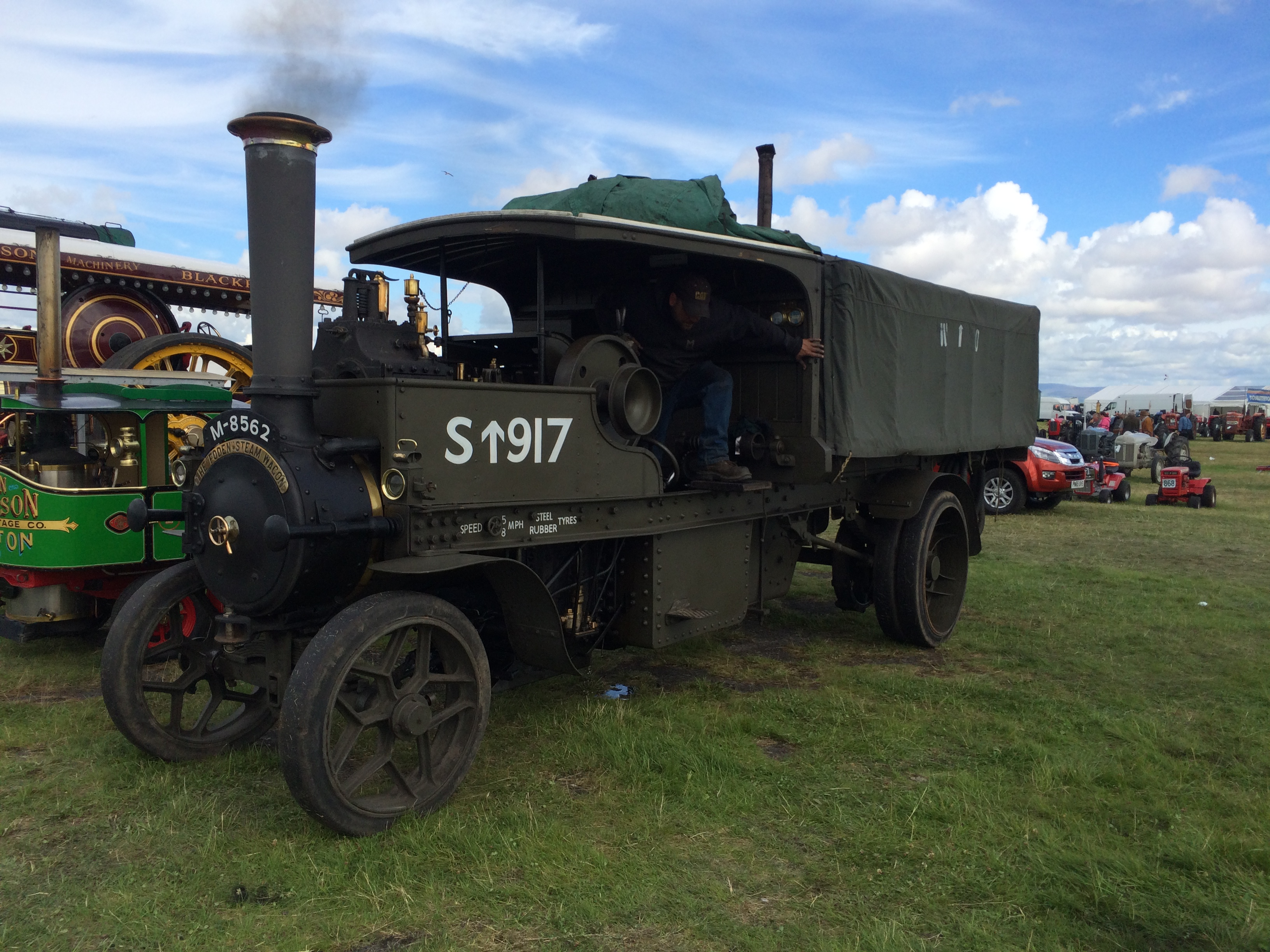

Overview
- Manufacturer: Foden Limited
- Production: 1904–1925
- Designer: Edwin Foden

Body and chassis
- Class: 5-ton steam wagon
- Layout: Front-engine, rear-wheel-drive

Powertrain
- Engine: Coal fired locomotive type boiler 2-cylinder compound steam engine 40 bhp (30 kW)
- Transmission: 2 forward, 1 reverse
- Propulsion: Chain driven rear wheels

Dimensions
- Wheelbase: 14 ft 4 in (4.37 m)
- Length: 22 ft (6.7 m)
- Width: 7 ft 6 in (2.29 m)
- Height: 10 ft (3.05 m)
- Kerb weight: ≈ 9 long tons (9.14 t)

Chronology
- Successor: Foden C Type

The Foden 5-ton overtype steam wagon was a steam wagon produced by Foden Limited in the early 20th century. The 5-ton steam wagon was developed between 1901 and 1904 and produced between 1904 and 1925.

Large numbers of 5-ton overtype steam wagons served with the British military during the First World War. Small numbers of 5-ton overtype steam wagons also served with the American Expeditionary Forces during the war.

== Design ==
The 5-ton steam wagon was a front-engine, rear-wheel-drive, cab behind engine steam lorry. It was an 'overtype' steam wagon, meaning the steam engine was mounted on top of the boiler. The driver's position was located on the left hand side of the boiler. The 5-ton steam wagon was 22 ft (6.7 m) in length, 7 ft 6 in (2.29 m) wide and it had a 14 ft 4 in (4.37 m) wheelbase. It weighed approximately 9 long tons (9.14 t) and had a specified payload capacity of 5 long tons (5.08 t), whilst a further 2 long tons (2.03 t) could be carried on a trailer.

The 5-ton steam wagon was powered by a coal fired horizontally mounted locomotive type boiler which developed steam pressure of 200 pounds per square inch (1,400 kPa), and a 2-cylinder compound steam engine which developed 40 bhp (30 kW). (Note: Contradictory sources exist about the Foden's compound steam engine's bore diameter and stroke length. Some sources state the engine's first cylinder's bore x stroke was 4 in × 7 in (102 mm × 178 mm) and the second cylinder's was 6 3/4 in × 7 in (171 mm × 178 mm). Other sources state the first cylinder was 4 1/8 in × 7 in (105 mm × 178 mm) and the second cylinder 6 in × 7 in (152 mm × 178 mm).)

The 5-ton steam wagon was driven through a 2-speed transmission with a single long drive chain connecting the transmission to the differential on the rear axle. It was fitted with leaf spring suspension, a foot actuated flywheel brake and drum brakes on the rear wheels. The front wheels were 2 ft 9 in (0.84 m) x 5 in (130 mm) wide and the rear wheels were 3 ft 6 in (1.07 m) x 10 in (250 mm) wide. 5-ton steam wagons fitted with rubber tyres had a maximum speed of 8 mph (13 km/h), whilst those with steel tyres had a maximum speed of 5 mph (8 km/h).

== History ==
Over the course of 1900 and 1901, Edwin Foden produced a series of steam wagon prototypes. With the Second Boer War raging, in December 1901 the last of these prototypes competed in a War Office trial of self-propelled lorries at Aldershot against entries from three other manufacturers. (Note: In the 1901 War Office trials, Thornycroft entered two undertype steam wagons of different designs, Straker-Squire entered a single undertype steam wagon, Milnes entered a licence-built German Daimler petrol powered lorry and Foden entered one overtype steam wagon.) The result of the trial was the Foden wagon came second to a steam wagon from Thornycroft, but the War Office purchased both designs and dispatched them to South Africa, arriving in country at the end of February 1902. During the Boer War, the steam wagons performed well, but the Foden wagon, which was rated at 3-ton payload capacity, was found to be susceptible to breakdowns. Post-war, Foden made a number of successive improvements to the general design, and by 1904 the 5-ton steam wagon design was set, remaining virtually unchanged until 1925.

Upon their introduction, the 5-ton steam wagon along with other steam wagons substantially reduced transportation costs within Great Britain, and large numbers were purchased by commercial operators in Britain. Despite not being included in the War Office Subsidy Schemes for petrol lorries prior to the First World War, the War Office had purchased a number of 5-ton steam wagons, including an order for 20 in 1913. The War Offices would also hire additional Fodens for manoeuvres.

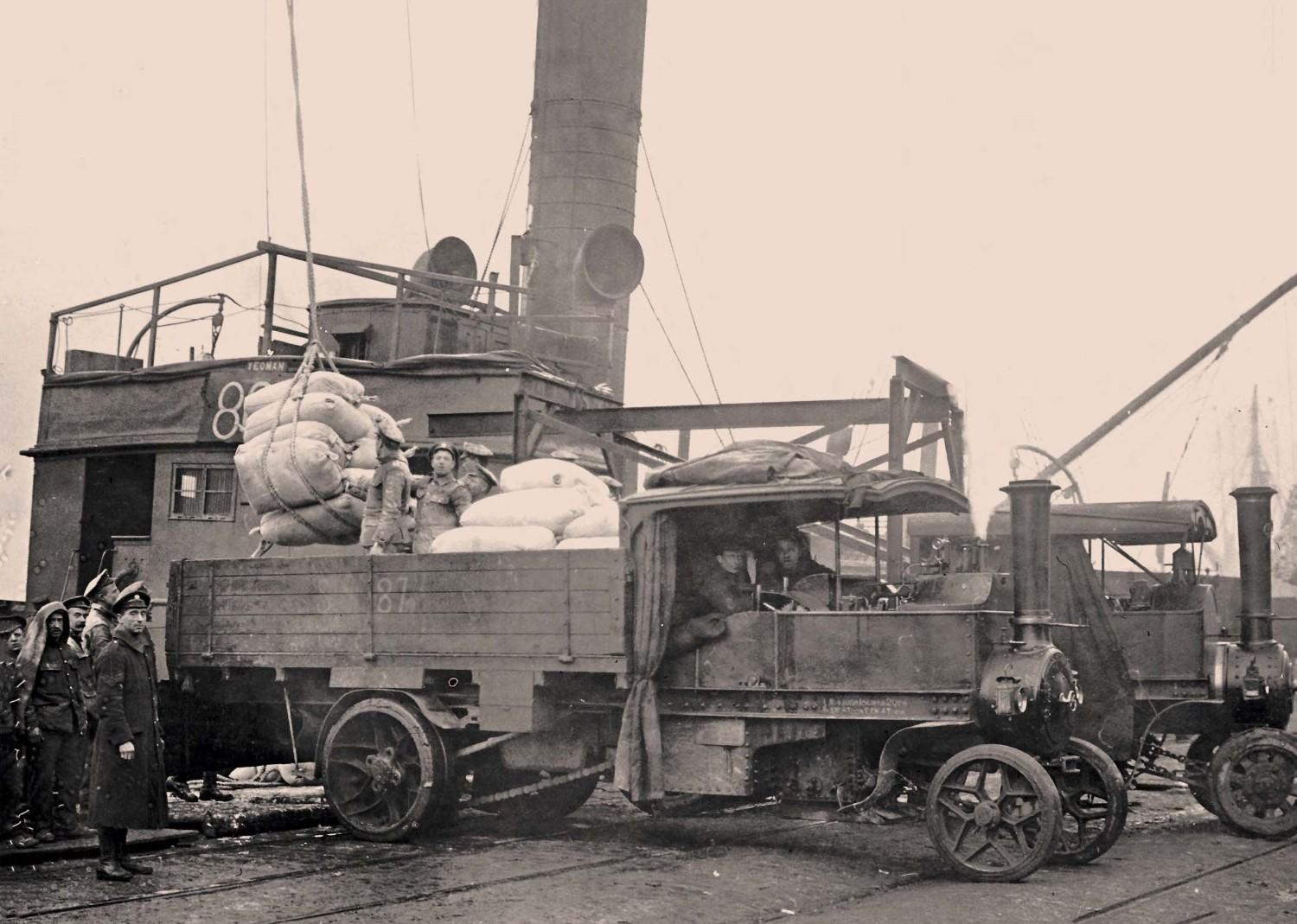
5-ton steam wagon being loaded with stores

With the outbreak of war in 1914, the War Office commissioned Scammell & Nephew to impress 84 5-ton steam wagons into military service; additionally, Foden turned over all production to the War Office. Over the course of the war, practically every civilian 5-ton steam wagon in existence was impressed into military service.

During the war, the Foden 5-ton steam wagon was operated with a number of different body types including General Service (GS) cargo, tipper, rolling floor and mobile disinfector. The mobile disinfector vehicles carried two large steel drums designed by the Thresh Disinfector company of Westminster and manufactured by the Summerscales company of Yorkshire. Clothing and bedding of soldiers rotating out of the front line were placed into the drums which were then filled with steam from the boiler, this in turn killed any lice and other vermin within the clothing. The rolling floor vehicles were used in road construction, the floors were a hand wound conveyor belt made from wooden slats enabling the unloading of road metal – in practice the metal frequently got jammed between the slats, but the system was popular at the time.

Compared to petrol motor lorries in British military service, the Foden steam wagon had a number of disadvantages. From cold, a Foden took at least an hour to start and there was a constant requirement to find water. Additionally they had to be operated well away from the enemy's lines – by day steam wagons produced large plumes of steam and by night large volumes of bright sparks; so, if they were operated too close to the front lines they were identifiable and targetable by enemy artillery fire. Despite their disadvantages, due to their extremely strong construction they were frequently overloaded with payloads of 6 long tons (6.1 t) and infrequently payloads of up to 12 long tons (12.2 t), twice and up to quadruple the payload capacity of the standard War Office 3-ton motor lorry.

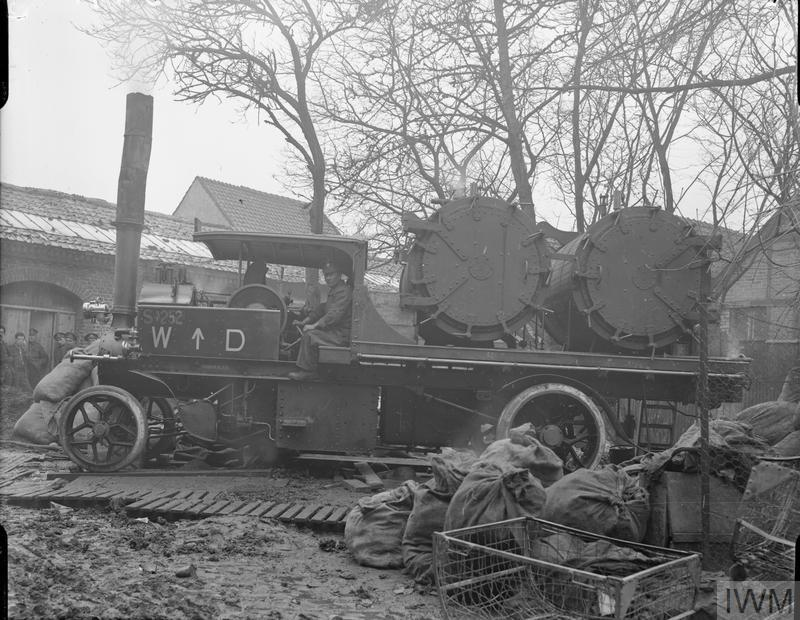
Foden disinfecting lorry, 1917.

The American Expeditionary Forces purchased a number of Foden steam wagon mobile disinfectors from the British War Office and found them to be very effective, although the steam from lorry melted the buttons on the American uniforms.

After the war, most Foden steam wagons were repatriated to the United Kingdom where a large number were returned to civilian hands, although a number remained in military service. In 1920, 150 cargo carriers and 18 mobile disinfectors remained in service. The American Expeditionary Forces' vehicles were all sold in Tours, 10 of which along with their Thresh disinfector equipment were purchased and dispatched to Poland to help combat a typhus outbreak.

By the 1920s, the Foden 5-ton steam wagon had become extremely outdated, particularly its poor forward visibility, old fashioned brakes and extremely slow maximum speed. In 1925, the 5-ton steam wagon was replaced by the 6-ton Foden C Type steam wagon which addressed many of these issues.
