= Dennis Brothers =

English motor vehicle manufacturer

Dennis Brothers Limited
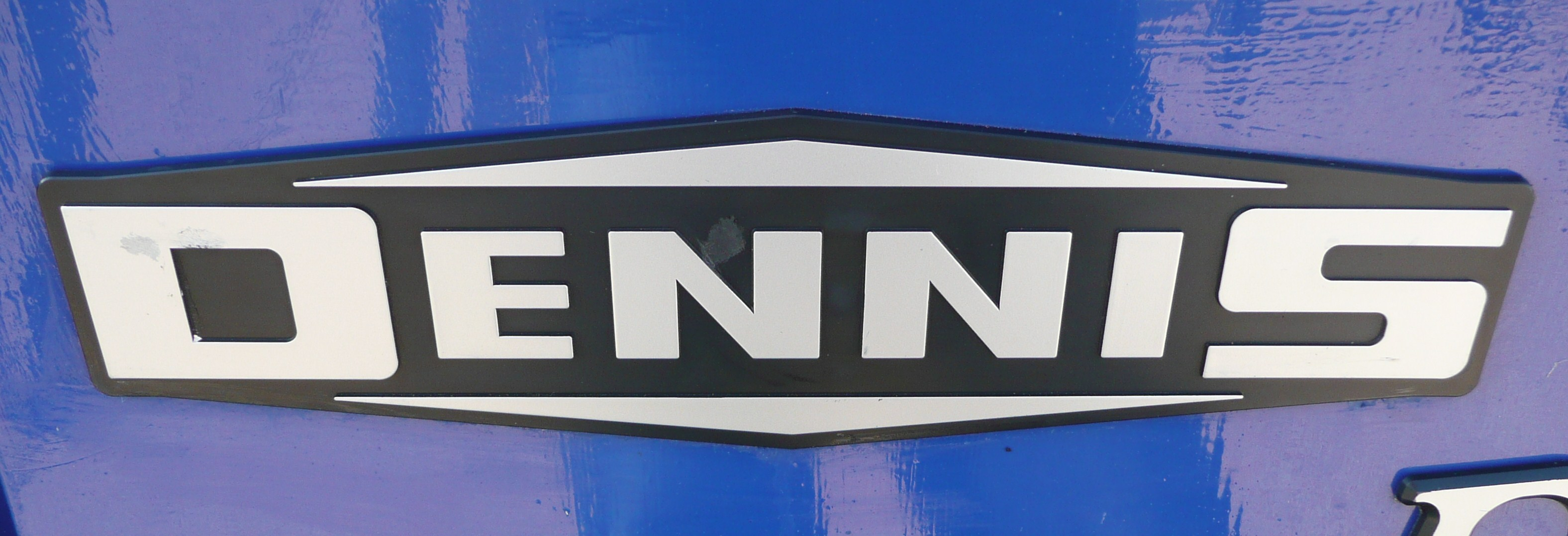
- The later style of Dennis badge
- Type: Public listed company
- Industry: Automotive
- Founded: 1895
- Founder: John and Raymond Dennis
- Fate: 1972 taken over by Hestair Group
- Successor: Dennis Specialist Vehicles
- Headquarters: Guildford, England
- Products: Cars, Lorries, Buses; Fire appliances; Vans, Ambulances; Waste management vehicles; Motor mowers; Airport tugs
- Subsidiaries: White and Poppe

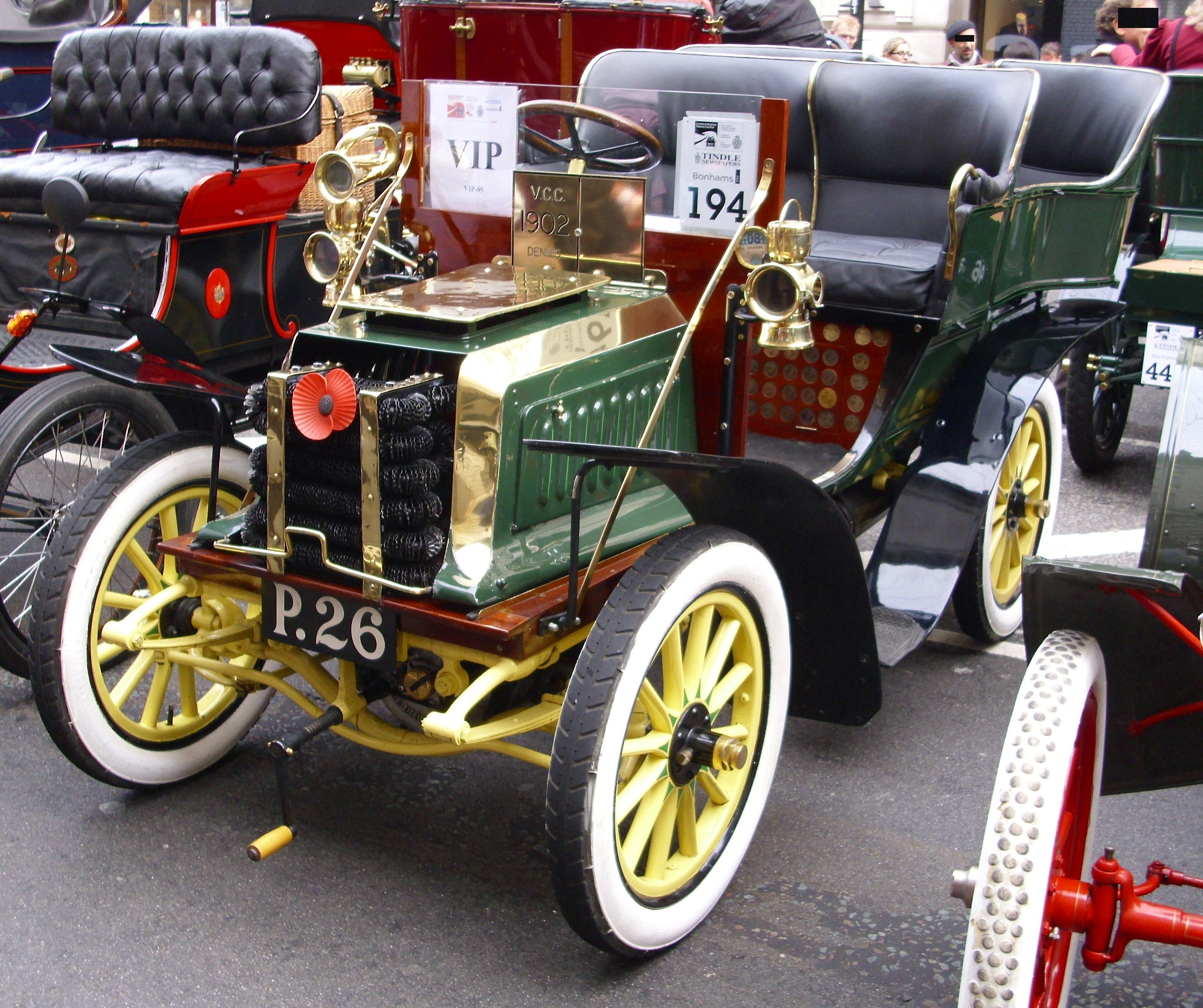
Dennis 1902

Dennis Brothers Limited was an English manufacturer of commercial vehicles based in Guildford. It is best remembered as a manufacturer of buses, fire engines and lorries (trucks) and municipal vehicles such as dustcarts. All vehicles were made to order to the customer's requirements and more strongly built than mass production equivalents. Dennis Brothers was Guildford's main employer.

Following a decade of financial difficulties the original shareholders sold out in 1972 and Dennis's ownership has since passed through quite a number of hands.

== History ==
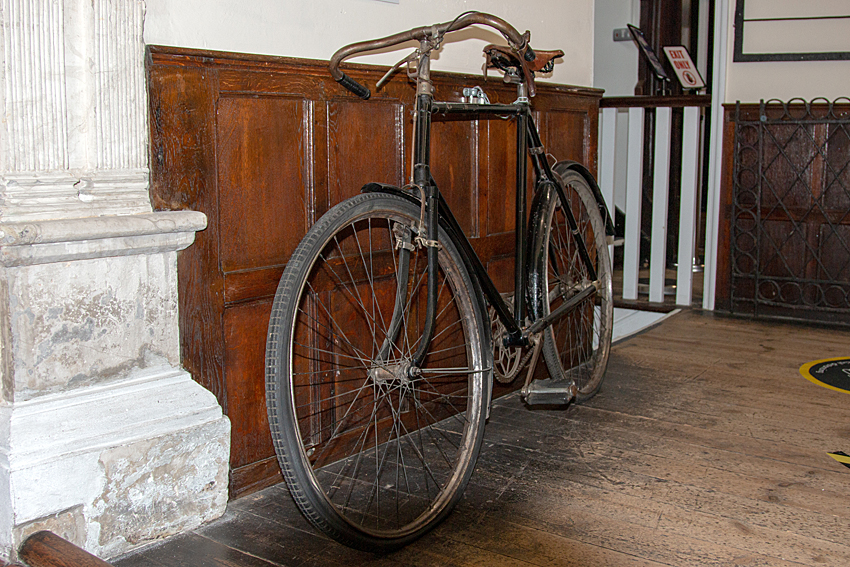
Dennis Speed King bicycle

Dennis Brothers was founded in 1895 by brothers John Cawsey Dennis (1871–1939) and (Herbert) Raymond Dennis (1878–1939) who made Speed King bicycles. They built the bicycles, initially from bought-in parts, and sold them from their shop, The Universal Athletic Stores, in High Street, Guildford. They made their first motor vehicle in 1898, and in 1899, their first car, The Dennis Light Doctor's Car. Though shown at the National Cycle Show this car was never put into production.

They made their first motor vehicle in 1898, a De Dion-powered tricycle which they exhibited at the National Cycle Show, which they offered for sale, along with a quadricycle. In 1899, the first Dennis car proper appeared, the Speed-King Light Doctors' Car, a four-wheeler with a 3.5hp a rear-mounted de Dion engine and three-speed gearbox for speeds of 4–10 mph (6.4–16.1 km/h). Intended for use on unpaved roads by the likes of doctors, surveyors, or travelling salesmen, it had an offering price of £135; though shown at the National Cycle Show, it was never produced or sold.

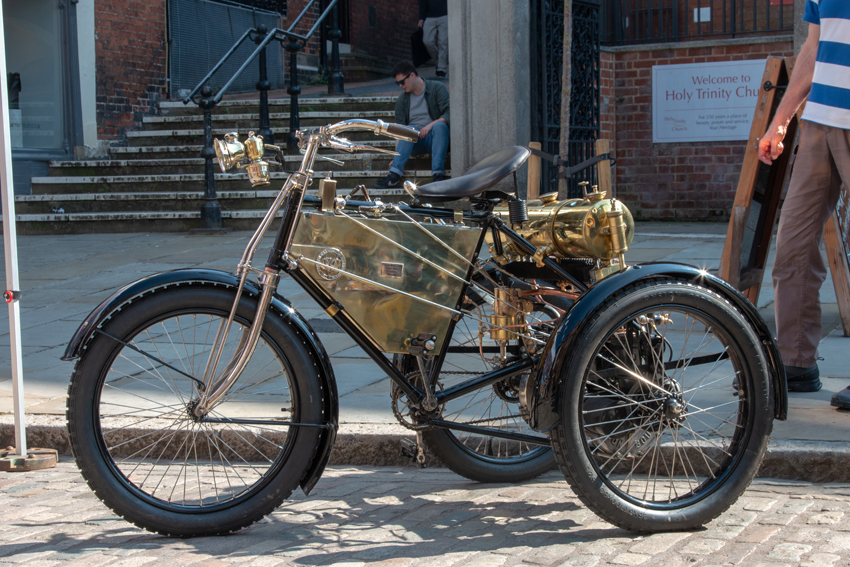
1902 Dennis tricycle with de Dion Bouton engine

At the 1900 National Cycle Show, Dennis displayed only motor tricycles and quadricycles, with the tricycles claimed to be capable of a (then-remarkable) 30 mph (48 km/h), three times Britain's speed limit. The next year, a 3.5hp de Dion engine was offered in the tricycle, while there was a choice of two light cars, both with tube frames, three-speed gearbox, and shaft drive: an 8hp de Dion single and a 12hp Aster twin. About this time the brothers built the first purpose-built motor vehicle factory in Britain, later known as the Rodboro Buildings, to manufacture motorcars in the town centre.

In July 1901, the business was formally incorporated as Dennis Brothers Limited with a capital of £7,500.

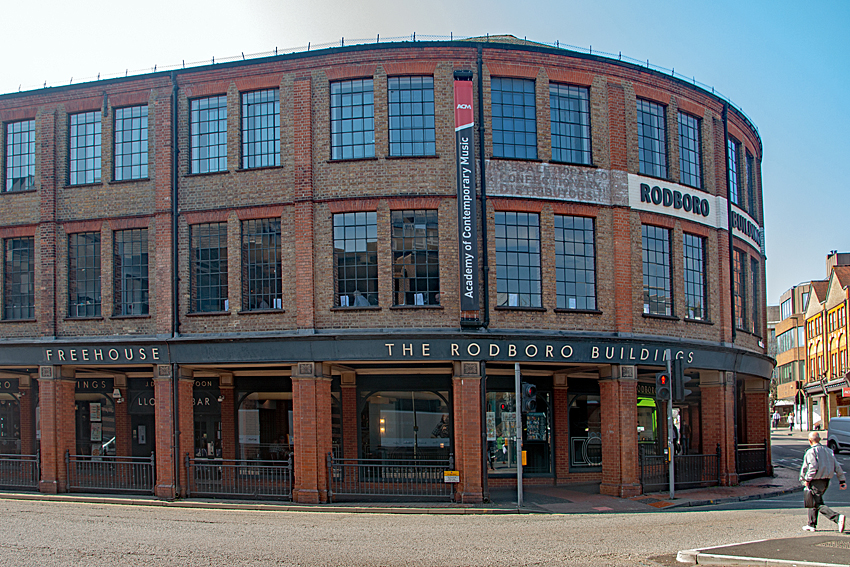
Rodboro Buildings

The 1903 London Motor Show saw the debut of an Aster-powered four, the 16/20 hp, which joined a 12hp de Dion, offered as a hansom, making it one of the first motorised taxicabs. It was also in this period Dennis offered its first and only sports racer, powered by a 40hp Simms, while the tricycles and quadricycles were discontinued. They were replaced by commercial vehicles, with the first bus being made in 1903.

In 1905, Dennis entered the inaugural Tourist Trophy with a pair of standard (stock) 14hp tourers, which came sixteenth and eighteenth, competing against specialist racers.

The next year, a 20hp Roi de Belges phaeton covered 4,000 mi (6,400 km) which earned it the 1907 Dewar Trophy, and it became a production model. 24/30 and 30/35 White and Poppe engines were offered, and soon became usual, indicative of a gradual climb in market status.

Two models, a 20hp and a 35/40, both fours, appeared in 1908, while on the commercial vehicle side, the first Dennis fire engine appeared the same year. For 1909, these were replaced by all new 18hp, 24hp, 28hp, and 40hp models in 1910. Of these, only the 40 survived; the larger 18hp and 24hp, as well as a "monstrous" 28hp six, disappeared for 1912. The 18hp was renamed the 20, and a new 24hp appeared at the end of 1911; they were joined in 1913 by a 15.9hp, which survived until the start of the First World War.

In 1913 Dennis moved to a larger factory at Woodbridge, on the outskirts of Guildford.

After the war, car production did not resume, and in 1919 Dennis bought the engine manufacturers, White and Poppe, who had previously supplied engines and gearboxes to a number of small companies. In 1933 Dennis transferred engine production from Coventry to Guildford and closed White and Poppe.

The company would also make a foray into the production of lawn tractors.

== Notes ==
=== Sources ===
- Wise, David Burgess. "Dennis: Bicycles, Motor Cycles, and Fire Engines", in Ward, Ian, executive editor. World of Automobiles, Volume 5, p. 527. London: Orbis, 1974.

== See also ==
- Dennis Specialist Vehicles
- Alexander Dennis
- Dennis Eagle
- List of automobile manufacturers
- List of defunct automobile manufacturers
