= War Office Subsidy Scheme =

Early 20th century British civil mobilization programme

In 1900 the War Office formed a Mechanical Transport Committee looking to develop the use of mechanical transport as a way to move troops, equipment and supplies (as an alternative to horse drawn transport). A subsidy scheme - also known as a subvention scheme - was devised where approved vehicles (tested in subsidy trials) bought by civilian owners would be granted a subsidy in exchange for the vehicles being made available in time of war. While the financial details of the scheme were complex and changed over time, the trials and their results both improved the vehicles and engines available for heavy transport, and had an important influence on the vehicles and engines that were made and used during WW1.

Similar schemes were operated before WW1 in Germany and France.

== Early motor trials ==
These early trials of fitness had financial rewards, as well as the resulting commercial benefits.

December 1901 - Trials of self-propelled lorries for military purposes, announced in September 1901 with 30 to 40 lorries expected to take part. However considerably fewer took part, and just prior to the trial it was announced that 11 had applied, for 8 of which their type was specified (7 steam, and 1 internal combustion). The results were a first prize of £500 to the Thornycroft Steam Wagon Company, second prize of £250 to Messrs Edwin Foden & Co, and third prize of £100 to the Straker Steam Vehicle Company.

October/November 1903 - The next set of trials had such challenging targets for performance, that only a single vehicle took part. In particular the requirement for hauling a load for 40 miles without pausing for fuel or water (while remaining under the 13 ton weight limit) eliminated steam traction. A tractor devised by Richard Hornsby & Sons with a twin cylinder Hornsby–Akroyd oil engine was the only vehicle to enter the trial. This not only met but exceeded the requirements of the War Office and was duly awarded the £1,000 first prize, plus a bonus of £180 for completing 58 miles without refueling (18 miles further than required, earning a bonus of £10 per mile). Furthermore it drove down from Grantham to Aldershot, completed the trial, and then drove back to Grantham.

== Subsidy trials before WW1 ==
The subsidy scheme was proposed in 1902 by Captain Cecil Battine and Arthur Stanley (chairman of the RAC), Nothing happened regarding this proposal, though it did galvanise the German authorities to create their own system. When the scheme was announced in the UK in January 1907, the offer of £2 per year per vehicle was in stark contrast to the German £200 initial subsidy and £50 per year for 5 years. The UK terms were revised in 1911, with a £12 subsidy for initial purchase, and £15 per year for two years, subject to 6 monthly inspections. To be approved British vehicles had to meet a very detailed specification published in 1912. The fact the subsidy vehicles has a slightly more expensive specification than civilian ones, and had to be subject to 6-monthly inspections, meant the value of the subsidy was fairly marginal.

First subsidy trial, 1912. Leyland Motors gained subsidy certificates for both class A (3 ton) and class B (30 cwt).

Second trial, January 1913 (originally scheduled for March it was brought forward as all vehicles were ready). Subsidy certificates were awarded to class A vehicles by J. and E. Hall Ltd (Hallford trademark), and J. I. Thornycroft & Co Ltd.

Third trial, October 1913. A Dorman engine was entered for evaluation (the Lacre chassis in which it was installed not being assessed) and was awarded a subsidy certificate. Subsidy certificates were awarded to Clayton & Company Ltd (Karrier trademark) class A, Walker Brothers of Wigan (Pagefield trademark) class A, and Wolseley Tool and Motor Car Company, class A and class B.

Fourth Trial - May 1914. Certificates were awarded to Commercial Cars Ltd (trademark Commer) class A, Dennis Brothers (subject to engine changes) class A, and Leyland Motors Ltd class A. The granting of a certificate to one further entrant was still under consideration - almost certainly the Maudslay.

A fifth trial was planned for October 1914, but by then WW1 had started, so the trial was cancelled.

Vehicles in the subsidy scheme gave an initial supply of vehicles for the war effort, but far greater numbers were impressed by the military authorities. The manufacturers who had been granted subsidy certificates (and engine manufacturers who gained certificates) had a particular advantage when more vehicles were required. In the case of Dorman, this included the adoption of the engines in the War Department Light Railway tractors built in large numbers by The Motor Rail & Tramcar Co. The Tylor engine, used in the Karrier Class A truck and hence subsidy certified, was also used in AEC Y Type WW1 trucks, even though AEC up until that time had an arrangement with Daimler to use their engines. For the British Forces alone a total of 440,000 lorries were produced during the course of the war.

== Other subsidy schemes before WW1 ==
The German subsidy scheme was outlined in an article in Commercial Motor in 1908, amounting to £200 initial subsidy and £50 per year for 5 years for vehicles approved by their War Office. Manufacturers were able to apply to the scheme individually and have their vehicles inspected for compliance with the requirements. Vehicles had to be made in Germany, and the sale of the subsidy vehicles abroad was not permitted. A similar scheme was introduced by the Bavarian Ministry of War in 1908, and heavy vehicle trials organised by the Austrian Motor Club had valuable prizes donated by the Imperial War Office.

French trials for vehicles for military use were run by the Automobile Club of France (ACF) annually from 1905, with the prizes funded by the French War Department. The French subsidy scheme, introduced in 1910, offered £120 initial subsidy and £40 per year for three years. Soon after war was declared it was realised that a particular aspect of the French scheme (whereby every component had to be made in France and of French materials) was of vital importance due to the dominance of Robert Bosch GmbH in the supply of magnetos used by aircraft, motor cycles, cars and trucks. The French subsidy system had led to Bosch building a factory in France, and this enabled some magneto supply in the early stages of WW1 while allied alternatives were rapidly put into production.

== Post WW1 scheme ==
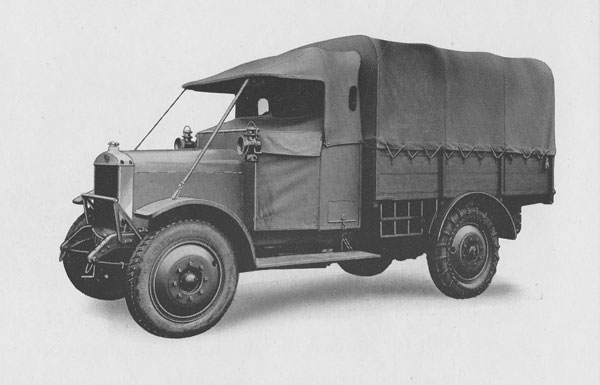
Guy Motors subsidy truck, 1924

A new subsidy scheme was introduced in 1922 for 30cwt lorries, and was less strict in the details of the vehicles eligible. The following makers were granted subsidy certificates in 1923, Clément-Talbot, Albion Motor Car Co, Crossley Motors, and Karrier Motors, Thornycroft added their A1 subsidy model in October 1924, Guy Motors also produced a 30cwt subsidy model. In 1924 the scheme was extended to three years, and in 1926 it was extended for the first time to include six wheeled vehicles. Thornycroft, Crossley and Leyland all produced subsidy 6-wheelers.

The subsidy scheme was closed down in 1935, with no new vehicles from 31 July. Vehicles already on the system continued until expiry of the subsidy period.
