= Royal Artillery during World War I =

During the First World War, the Royal Artillery saw its transformation from an auxiliary arm supporting the infantry into the dominant military branch on the battlefield. With the onset of trench warfare, the Royal Artillery developed specialized, technical tactics, operating with a much higher degree of operational independence. By the end of the war, it had become the second largest branch in the British Army, reaching a peak strength of 550,000 officers and men.

== Leadership, command and control ==
The General Officer Commanding Royal Artillery (GOCRA) of the Army was charged with the co-ordination of all artillery action, both in offensive and defence. Working closely with the General Staff, he developed proposals for the Army Commander as the definition of counter-battery zones between corps, regulation of cross-corps fire, and cooperation with the Royal Flying Corps. He also worked in close touch with the General Staff (Intelligence) and Field Survey Company in all matters affecting artillery intelligence.

Below him was the General Officer Commanding Royal Artillery of the Corps. He was responsible for establishing the general plan for countering enemy artillery—including both its systematic destruction and its temporary suppression (e.g., during an infantry attack). This also included the integration of field artillery. Other tasks involved coordinating with neighbouring corps, providing updates on the current counter-battery situation, managing ammunition, and control of the counter-battery units.

The Brigadier-General, Commanding Corps Heavy Artillery, was the executive commander of all the heavy and siege batteries allotted to the Corps. In each Corps a Counter-Battery Staff Officer was responsible for the organization and execution of counter-battery work in accordance with the instructions of the GOCRA of the Corps. Before the war, guns heavy artillery such as the 4.7-inch and 60-pounder were assigned directly to infantry divisions to provide fire support. Siege artillery, equipped with heavy guns such as 6-inch, 8-inch, howitzers or 12 and 14 inch guns, was under the command of an army corps.With the onset of trench warfare on the Western Front, all heavy guns were centrally organized at the corps level in Heavy Artillery Groups (HAGs) under the command of a lieutenant colonel

Field and horse artillery as part of the divisional artillery, were under the command of a brigadier general—the division’s Commander of the Royal Artillery (CRA). Before the outbreak of war, the divisional artillery consisted of three 18-pounder brigades, one brigade of 4.5-inch howitzers, and a heavy battery of the Royal Garrison Artillery (RGA) equipped with four BL 60-pounder guns. In August 1914, the 60-pounder battery was disbanded and replaced by an Royal Horse Artillery (RHA) 13-pounder brigade and two RGA batteries, each with four 4.7-inch guns. By the end of 1914, the divisional artillery had been reduced to three brigades, each consisting of three RFA batteries with four guns each.

In 1915, the divisional artillery units were expanded to include three trench mortar batteries designated X, Y, and Z, which were later reorganized into two batteries, each with six mortars (X and Y). Howitzer batteries and brigades were designated with an "H" until May 1916; at that time, the RFA was reorganized so that all brigades consisted of three field gun batteries and one howitzer battery. In early 1917, the divisional artillery units were reduced to two brigades. The remaining brigades became Army Field Brigades, strategic reserves deployed wherever additional firepower was needed. Each brigade had a strength of 755 to 795 men, including officers, and was under the command of a lieutenant colonel. A brigade had a staff of four officers and consisted of either two RHA or three RFA batteries. The batteries comprised 168 to 198 men and four to six cannons or howitzers under the command of a major. Compared to cavalry squadrons or infantry companies, batteries operated almost autonomously. Mounted batteries were designated by letters, while field artillery batteries were numbered.

== Recruitment and training ==
The recruitment followed the same pattern as those for the rest of the army. Once a man had passed the examination and considered fit for service he was sent to his training depot. Training was based on the Field Service Regulations of 1909 and lasted about 11 months. The annual training cycle began with physical training, drill, and marching exercises, while the recruits learned weapon handling, self-defence, signalling, and reconnaissance. Unit training began in the spring, initially with exercises battery level. It concluded in the summer with large-scale manoeuvres at the brigade and division levels. The training included Gunnery, handling ammunition, and ballistics. Additionally recruits of the RHA were trained in raiding horse care and stable work. Following Lord Kitchener's successful recruitment campaign, training was reduced to six months in order to provide enough soldiers. Officer candidates were sent to the Royal Military Academy, Woolwich attending a 2 years course. In addition, students could take courses offered by the Officers’ Training Corps at universities or other public schools.

== Ammunition crisis ==
Before 1914, the British War Office, under Field Marshal Lord Kitchener, anticipated a short war of manoeuvre, for which shrapnel shells were the preferred choice. In trench warfare, however, high-explosive shells were needed to destroy positions and barbed wire. The British arms industry was not structurally equipped for the mass production of millions of artillery shells. Of the 481,000 high-explosive shells required for the first quarter of 1915, only 52,000 had been produced. The British Commander-in-Chief, Field Marshal Sir John French, had already requested more ammunition. Following the defeat at the Battle of Aubers, a report leaked by French to The Times blamed the lack of high-explosive shells. The ensuing shells scandal led to the creation of the Ministry of Munitions, under David Lloyd George. With Munitions of War Act 1915 the labour law was restricted, National Shell! Projectile (for heavy shells) and filling plants were established and expanded; in the process, more and more women and unskilled men were employed. By 1916 the number of shells produced had risen up to 35,407,193.

== Logistics ==
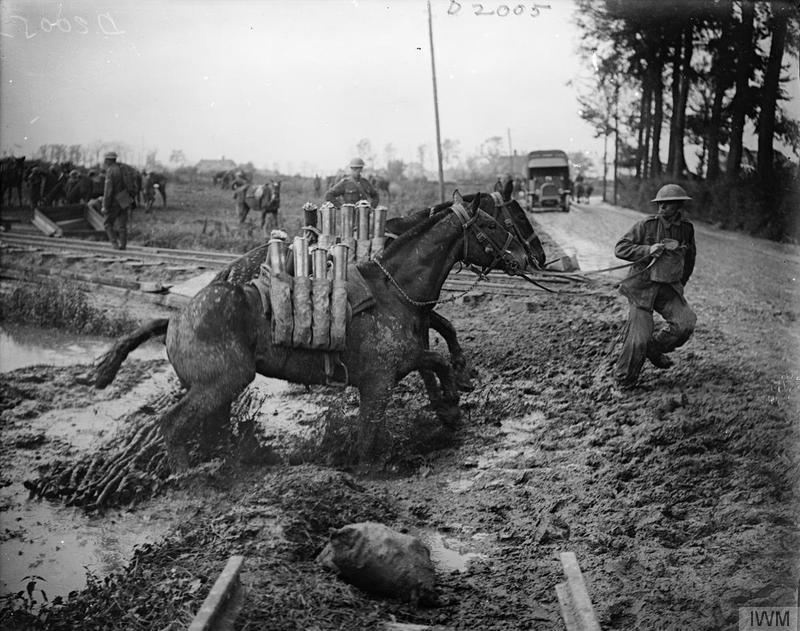
Pack horses carrying shells struggle through the mud near Ypres on the Western Front.

The Army Service Corps (ASC) was responsible for transporting ammunition from the ports and main supply depots by vehicle to the Divisional Ammunition Refill Points. The ammunition was transported from the railway stations to the resupply points by motorized transport units, each consisting of 342 men, including officers, 45 trucks with a load capacity of 3 tons, and 16 trucks with a load capacity of 1.5 tons. Each division had four ASC companies forming the divisional train, comprising 430 officers and men, 378 horses, 125 wagons, and 17 carts.

The handover to the front lines took place in stages. The Divisional Ammunition Columns received the ammunition from the ASC companies. From there, it was transferred by horse-drawn wagons to the Artillery Brigade Ammunition Columns and, the Heavy Artillery Battery Ammunition Columns. The Brigade and Heavy Battery Ammunition Columns distributed the ammunition accordingly to the respective batteries and sections. The cavalry’s ammunition was transported directly to the Brigade Ammunition Columns or the Battery Ammunition Columns.

== Tactics ==
The battles of 1914 had seen artillery misused by placing it too far forward, or underused by holding it back in reserve too long. Officers had considered artillery only as an infantry support. As a result there were neither much interest nor knowledge about the needs of artillery. With the transition into trench warfare the role of the artillery changed. From then on, the long-range heavy guns were removed from the front-line. This would ensure that they would not be overrun in the event of a sudden attack and would allow them to be massed. To support infantry attacks the British adopted the French system of "tir progressif" later known as barrage in which massed field artillery fired linear fire missions in a series of lifts.

Standard procedure was to fire a 100-yard barrage every three minutes at a rate of three rounds per minute per gun. A barrage of airburst shrapnel shells was fired from No Man's Land, advancing through and beyond the objective. This created a wall of fire in front of the attacking infantry. As the shrapnel shells contained balls that were fired forwards, the infantry could follow close behind the barrage. The fire passed across the enemy's front-line trench and continued into the support and reserve lines, preventing a counter-attack. In poor ground conditions, the interval between 100-yard lifts could be as long as five minutes to allow the struggling infantry to keep up. There were several types of barrage used in the British Artillery including creeping barrage, pile up barrage or lifting barrage.

=== Target acquisition and survey methods ===
In theory, if the same settings were applied to the sights and range dials of a battery of identical guns, the projectiles were expected to land in a neat row at the specified distance from the battery's front. This was essentially the basis for battery fire prior to 1914. In practice, these conditions were rarely met, resulting in the unfortunate nickname 'the Drop Shorts' among infantrymen. In order to avoid casualties, the RFA was forced to adopt the approaches of the RGA to achieve better results. Apart from knowing exactly where the battery and target were in relation to one another there were variables affecting the flight of shells including the temperature of the propellant charge, winds at different altitudes, barometric pressure and the characteristics of each individual gun.

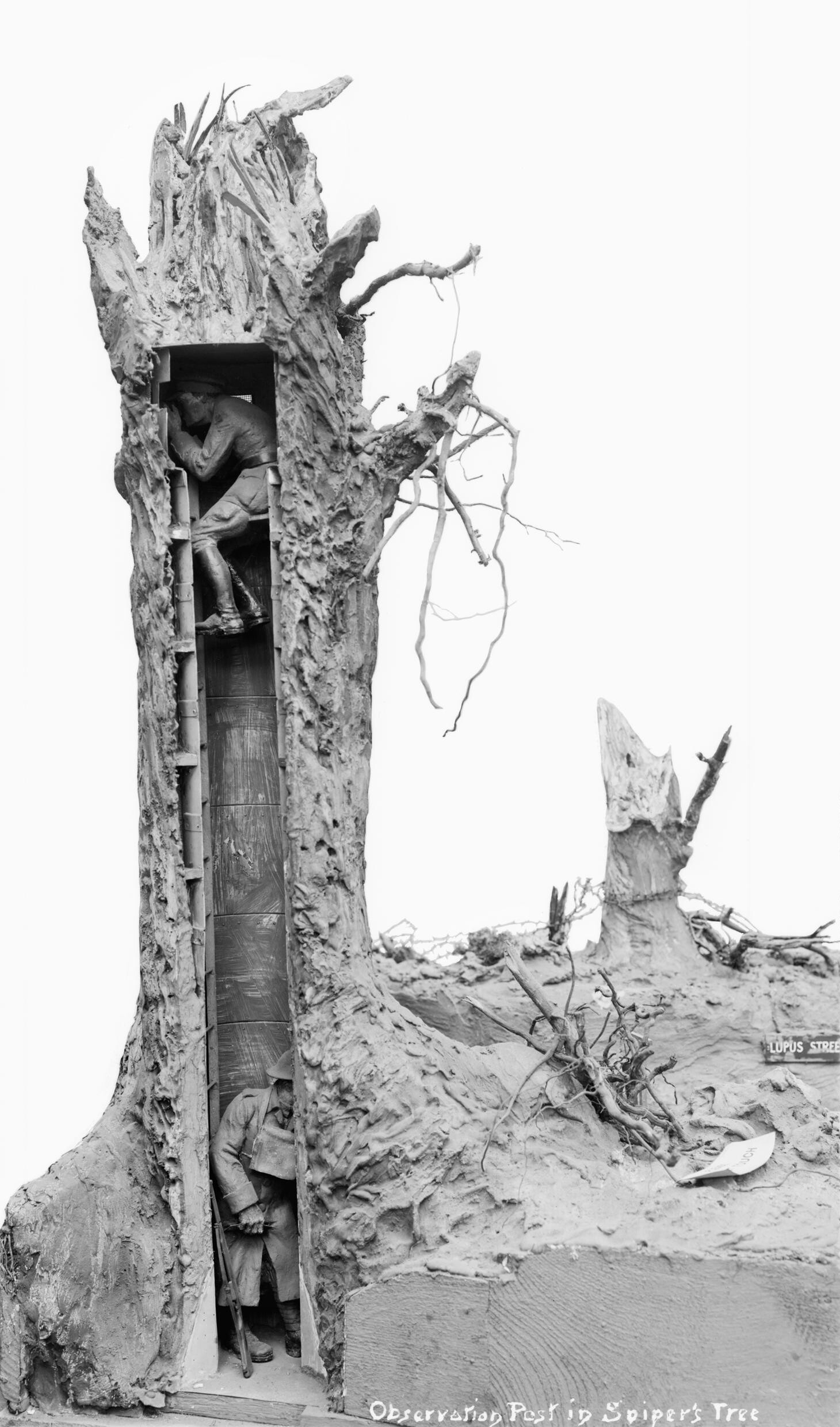
Model of a observation post camouflaged as an artificial tree.

Therefore, a battery fire plan were required involving different settings for each gun, based on pre-recorded data (known as calibration), to ensure the shells arrived in a line. It also required accurate timing across the entire formation to ensure they arrived when expected. Upon arrival in France, the BEF was supported by a Printing Company RE, responsible for distributing army maps. In late 1914, a 'ranging section' was added, which became the 1st Ranging & Survey Section following with the addition of topographers from the Ordnance Survey in 1915. Eventually, it expanded into three Topographic Sections, one for each British army on the Western Front. In 1916, the organisation expanded again to include three Field Survey Companies, each with specialist sections for surveying, map compilation and drawing, printing, observation and sound ranging. By 1918, each of these companies had grown to the size of a battalion.

Throughout 1915, heavy batteries were surveyed (Their exact locations were recorded on detailed maps, and bearings to target points, as well as distances and bearings to known targets, were determined.) by the Field Survey Section of the Royal Engineers. Battery positions could also be surveyed before they were manned, and the bearings could be marked with numbered iron posts. An artillery board which featured a map or grid showed the target points and targets already plotted for the battery. This enabled a battery to be operational very soon after its arrival and to fire with reasonable accuracy The system was soon extended from heavy artillery to field artillery.

Although both the French and Germans investigated the possibility of locating enemy batteries by sound early in the war, the British failed to recognise its advantage. Based on the fact that firing a gun creates an expanding circular shock wave travelling at the speed of sound a circle centred on the gun's location could theoretically be drawn on a map if recorded at the exact moment. In practice, accurately recording a single gunshot was difficult as the actual sound of gunfire was at low-frequency and much harder to detect than a sonic boom from a shell travelling faster than the speed of sound. Another method of detecting enemy artillery was by spotting the flash of a firing gun. By taking bearings on the flash from a number of locations the position of an enemy battery could located by triangulation.

== Living conditions ==
The artillery, depending on whether it was field or heavy artillery, was positioned between 2000 and ten thousand yards from the front.The dugouts used by the gunners differed greatly in construction and protection, depending on the nature of the ground and how long the battery had been stationed there. It varied from primitive shelters reinforced only by sandbags on which a man hardly could stand, to bunkers dug several feet into the ground.Similarly, observation points also varied. Since potential observation points could easily be identified by the enemy, shelters were often reinforced by concrete and steel, hidden inside buildings or underground chambers with periscopes emerging from the edge of a crater or from inside an artificial tree.

== Ordnance and equipment ==
=== Ammunition ===
There were five different types of ammunition used: shrapnel and gas shells against troops, high-explosives against trenches, star shells for illuminating the battlefield, incendiary shells for defending against zeppelins, and incendiary shells for ground targets. The propellant was a nitrocellulose/nitroglycerin (NC/NG) compound referred to as Cordite. Despite being more effective than straight NC it was also more erosive, wearing the gun barrels out quicker. The cordite was formed into sticks that varied in diameter. These sticks were then either tied into bundles for bagged charges or tipped directly into the cartridge case.

To close the case mouth, either a shell or a cardboard or soft metal cup was inserted. A primer containing a percussion cap while gunpowder was inserted into the base of the cartridge case, so that when loaded, it would be positioned in front of the firing pin when the breech was closed. Depending of the sort of weapon there were several charges available. For guns there were usually two charges: full for actual service and reduced for practice. In the case of howitzers, charges were selected individually to ensure the shell fell at the optimum angle, passing over any obstacles and dropping down to penetrate cover and paralyzed the entire defence infrastructure.

=== Guns ===
==== Field artillery ====
During the war the Royal Artillery had twenty-five different types of guns at its disposal. There were five types of anti-aircraft guns, ten types of field artillery and ten types of heavy artillery. The standard British field guns were based upon experience gained during the South African Wars. Failing to outgun the Boers using modern Krupp quick firing guns the British begun adopting the QF principle into British field artillery. By 1904, the QF 13-pounder gun for the Royal Horse Artillery and the QF 18-pounder gun for the field artillery were introduced. Both shared a common design, combining elements of the Armstrong gun and the Vickers recoil system. The 13-pounder had a calibre of 3 inches (76 mm) and fired a 12.5lbs (5.7 kg) shrapnel shell at a range of 5,900 yards (5,400 meters) with a velocity of 1,675 feet per second (511 m/s). The 18-pounder had a calibre of 3.3-inch (84 mm) and fired an 18.5-pound (8.4 kg) shell with a velocity of 1,615 feet per second (492 m/s) at a range of 6,525 yards (5,960 metres). Both guns were mounted on a simple pole-trail carriage, which restricted their elevation. Although this was a limitation of contemporary fire control methods, the 18-pounder could outperform any other field gun in Europe for the first ten years of its service.

Following the successful recruitment campaign of Lord Kitchener there were not enough guns and howitzers to equip the whole of the army. Thus several older weapons were still in use especially in the Territorial Army batteries. The most important of these were the QF 15-pounder gun the BLC 15-pounder gun the 4.7 inch gun, and the 5 inch howitzer. The QF 15-pounder Mark I featured an interrupted- screw breech mechanism, pole trail and hydro-spring recoil system. The 15-pounder BLC (breech loading, converted) consisted of a modern screw breech, a hydro-spring recoil system and two seats for the gun. Both guns fired the same 14lb (6.4kg) shell with a muzzle velocity of 1,590 feet per second (480 m/s) and a range of 5,750yd (5,250m)

The QF 4.7 in gun initially introduced in 1888, for naval and coastal defence it was later converted for field service. With a muzzle velocity of 2,150 feet per second (660 m/s) its 46lb (20.9kg) high explosive shell had a range of 10,000yd (9,100m). The 5-inch howitzer introduced in 1896 fired a 40 pounds (18 kg) high explosive shell with a muzzle velocity 788 feet per second (240 m/s) giving it a range of 6,500 yards (5,900 m).The QF 4.5 inch howitzer went into service in 1909. Its sliding block breech mechanism was prone to structural failure under continuous use. The repeated stress from firing concentrated in the breech's sharp internal corners, causing the steel to gradually weaken and shear, which could cause the block and half the breech ring to fly backwards. The problem, was eventually solved with the introduction of the Mark II howitzer, in early 1917. The howitzer could fire a 35lb (15.9 kg) shell with a range of 7,300 yards (6,700 m) at a velocity of 1,010 feet per second (310 m/s).

The BL 60-pounder Mk I gun (Note: Although part of the heavy artillery the 60-pounder on tactical level served as the heaviest field artillery gun.) entered service in 1905, replacing the QF 4.7-inch gun in the regular army and during the war those of the territorial army. It could fire shrapnel, high explosive, smoke and gas shells weighting 60 lb. The gun had a muzzle velocity of 2,080 feet per second (630 m/s) giving it a range of 10,300 yards (9,400 m). During the war the range was increased to 12,300 yards (11,200 m)

==== Heavy artillery ====
The 6 inch 30-cwt howitzer served both as a heavy artillery gun and as a heavy siege weapon. With an elevation of 70º a velocity of 777 ft/s its 118.5lb (53.8kg) shell had a range of 5,200yd (4,750m). An improved version the 6 inch 26 cwt howitzer with a velocity of 1234 ft/s fired a 100lb (45.4kg) shell to 9,500yd (8,680m) or a lighter 86lb (39kg) shell to 11,400yd (10,420m). The 6 inch Mark XIX gun introduced in 1916 fired a 100lb (45.4kg) high explosive shell with a velocity of 2350 ft/s giving it a range of 18,750yd (17,140m) at elevation of 38º. The 9.2 inch howitzer Mark I fired a 290lb (132kg) high explosive shell to a maximum range of 10,050yd (9,186m). The Mark II had range of 13,935yd (12,740m).

The 8-inch howitzers were designed as a temporary measure, involving the conversion of obsolete 6-inch (150 mm) guns. These old 6-inch guns, of various types and models, were shortened and enlarged to accommodate a 200 lb (90.8 kg) 8-inch (203 mm) shell. Each combination had a different weight, but the two common figures were a muzzle velocity of 1,500ft/sec with a 200lb (90.8kg) shell, giving a maximum range of 10,500 yd (9,600 m). Subsequent variants featured an increase of range of up to 12,300yd (11,240m). The 12 inch howitzer Mark II (the Mark I was a railway mounting) fired a 750lb (340.5kg) shell, giving it a maximum muzzle velocity of 1,196ft/s and a maximum range of 11,340yd (10,360m). In mid 1917 an improved version had a range of 14,350yd (13,120m). The 15 inch howitzer, privately developed by the Coventry Ordnance Works in 1914-15 had a maximum range of 10,795yd with a 1,4001b shell. Due to their poor range it confined to odd tasks where its short range was acceptable.

==== Anti-aircraft artillery ====
The 3 inch 20 cwt gun Mark I used a semi-automatic vertical sliding breech mechanism. The gun had a muzzle velocity of 2,500 feet per second (760 m/s) and fired a 16 pounds (7.3 kg) shrapnel or high explosive shell at an elevation of 90° giving it a ceiling of 23,500ft (7,170m). The army, though, considered that their priority was providing protection for the troops in the field, they also except for London took responsibility of air defence for the country. The chosen gun was the 13-pounder horse artillery gun, adopted for anti-aircraft purposes as the 13-pounder Mark III. The 13-pounder 9 cwt gun based on the 18-pounder gun but with shorted barrel. It used the larger propellant charge for the 18-pounder resulting in an increase of the muzzle velocity of 2,150 feet per second (660 m/s).The gun fired a 13 pounds (5.9 kg) high explosive shell at a maximal ceiling of 19,000 feet (5,800 m).

== Statistics ==
At the beginning of the war The Royal Artillery had a strength of almost 100,000 officers and men. By the end of the war on 11 November 1918 it has risen up to some 550,000. The Artillery suffered some 185.000 casualties whom which 49,000 were killed.During the war around 26,500 artillery pieces and between 162 mio. to 221 mio. shells have been produced.

== Bibliography ==
- Royal Artillery, ed. (1968). Minutes of Proceedings of the Royal Artillery Institution. Woolwich: Royal Artillery Institution.
- Ashworth, Tony (2000). Trench Warfare 1914–1918. London: Macmillan Press. ISBN 0-330-48068-5.
- Beckett, Ian F. W.; Simpson, Keith; Keegan, John (2014). Nation in Arms: The British Army in the First World War. Barnsley: Pen & Sword. ISBN 978-1-78346-183-7.
- Bull, Stephan (2015). An Officer's Manual of the Western Front 1914-1918. New York: Bloomsbury. ISBN 978-1-4728-4137-7.
- Chasseaud, Peter; et al. (Passchendaele in Perspective: the Third Battle of Ypres) (1997). "Field Survey in the Salient: Cartography and Artillery Survey in Flanders Operations in 1917". Problems, Plans and Performances and British Operational Command. London: Leo Cooper. ISBN 0-85052-588-8.
- Clarke, Dale (2004). British Artillery 1914-19 Field Artillery. Oxford: Osprey. ISBN 1-84176-688-7.
- Clarke, Dale (2005). British Artillery 1914-19 Heavy Artillery. Oxford: Osprey. ISBN 978-1-8417-6788-8.
- Clarke, Dale (2014). World War I Battlefield Artillery Tactics. Oxford: Osprey. ISBN 978-1-78200-590-2.
- Hanson, John Ivor (2009). Plough & Scatter: the Diary-Journal of a First World War Gunner. Sparkford: Haynes Publishing. ISBN 1-84425-717-7.
- Hogg, Ian V. (1998). Allied artillery of World War One. Marlborough: Crowood Press. ISBN 1-86126-104-7.
- James, Lawrence (2004). Warrior Race : a History of the British at War. New York: St. Martin's Griffin. ISBN 0-31230-738-1.
- Marble, Sanders (2003). The Infantry cannot do with a gun less: The Place of the Artillery in the British Expeditionary Force, 1914-1918. New York: Columbia University Press. ISBN 0-231-50219-2.
- Rawson, Andrew (2006). British Army Handbook 1914-1918. Stroud: Sutton. ISBN 0-7509-3745-9.
- Royle, Trevor (1985). The Kitchener Enigma. London: Michael Joseph. ISBN 0-7181-2385-9.
- Simkins, Peter (1988). Kitchener's Army : the Raising of the New Armies, 1914-16. Manchester: Manchester University Press. ISBN 0-7190-2637-7.
- Simkins, Peter; et al. (The Oxford History of the British Army) (1996). David Chandler, Ian Beckett (ed.). The Four Armies 1914-1918. Oxford: Oxford University Press. ISBN 0-19-285333-3.
- Strachan, Hew (2001). To Arms. The First World War. Vol. I. Oxford: Oxford University Press. ISBN 0-19-820877-4.
- Travers, Timothy (1993). The Killing Ground : the British Army, the Western Front, and the Emergence of Modern Warfare, 1900-1918. London: Routledge. ISBN 0-415-10448-3.
- War Office, ed. (1914). Field service pocket book, 1914. London: Harrison & Sons.
- War Office, ed. (1922). Statistics of the military effort of the British Empire during the Great War, 1914-1920. London: Harrison & Sons.
- Ministry of Munitions, ed. (1922). Part V Gun Ammunition: Filling and Completing. History of the Ministry of Munitions: The Supply of Munitions. Vol. 10. London: His Majesty’s Stationery Office.
