= QF 12 pounder 12 cwt gun =

QF 12 pounder 12 cwt gun may refer to:

- QF 12 pounder 12 cwt naval gun
- QF 12 pounder 12 cwt AA gun
