= Thornycroft J Type =

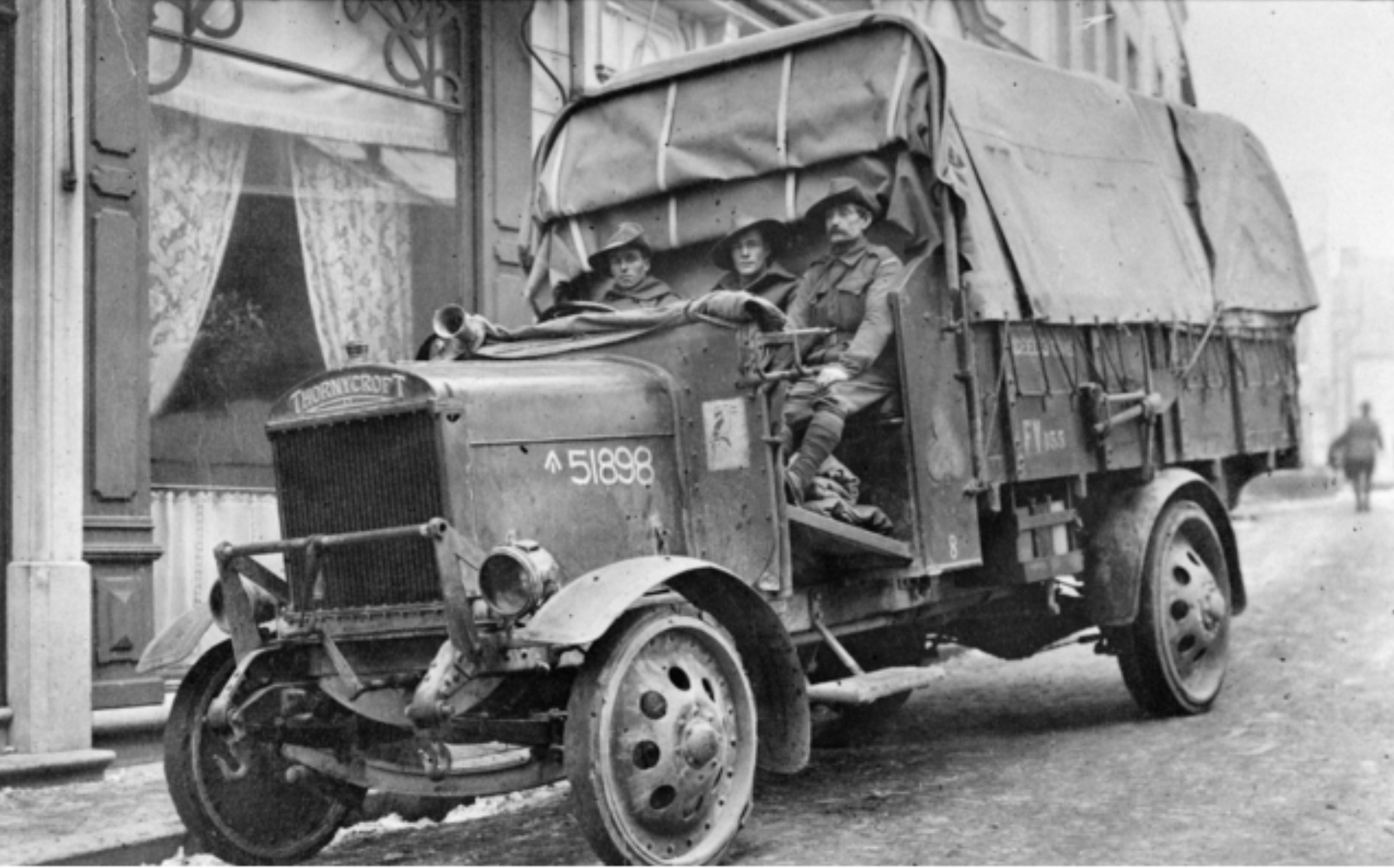
- Thornycroft J Type of the 1st AIF
- Type: 3-ton lorry
- Place of origin: United Kingdom

Service history
- Used by: British Empire
- Wars: First World War

Production history
- Designer: Thornycroft
- Manufacturer: Thornycroft
- Produced: 1911–1926

Specifications
- Mass: 4.45 long tons (4.52 t)
- Length: 22 ft 2 in (6.76 m); 13 ft 8 in (4.17 m) wheelbase
- Width: 7 ft 3 in (2.21 m)
- Height: 10 ft 5 in (3.18 m)
- Engine: Thornycroft I4 6,256 cc petrol 45 bhp (34 kW)
- Payload capacity: 3 long tons (3.05 t)
- Drive: 4x2
- Transmission: 4F1R
- Suspension: Semi-elliptical multi-leaf springs
- Maximum speed: 12 mph (19 km/h)
- References: A complete directory of military vehicles

The Thornycroft J Type was a British truck built by the Thornycroft company, it saw widespread service with the British military and Imperial forces during the First World War.

== Design ==
The J Type was a 3-ton 4x2 truck, it was powered by a Thornycroft M4 four-cylinder inline 6,256 cc side-valve petrol engine that developed 45 brake horsepower (34 kW) at 1,800 rpm, it drove the rear wheels through a four-speed gearbox.

== History ==
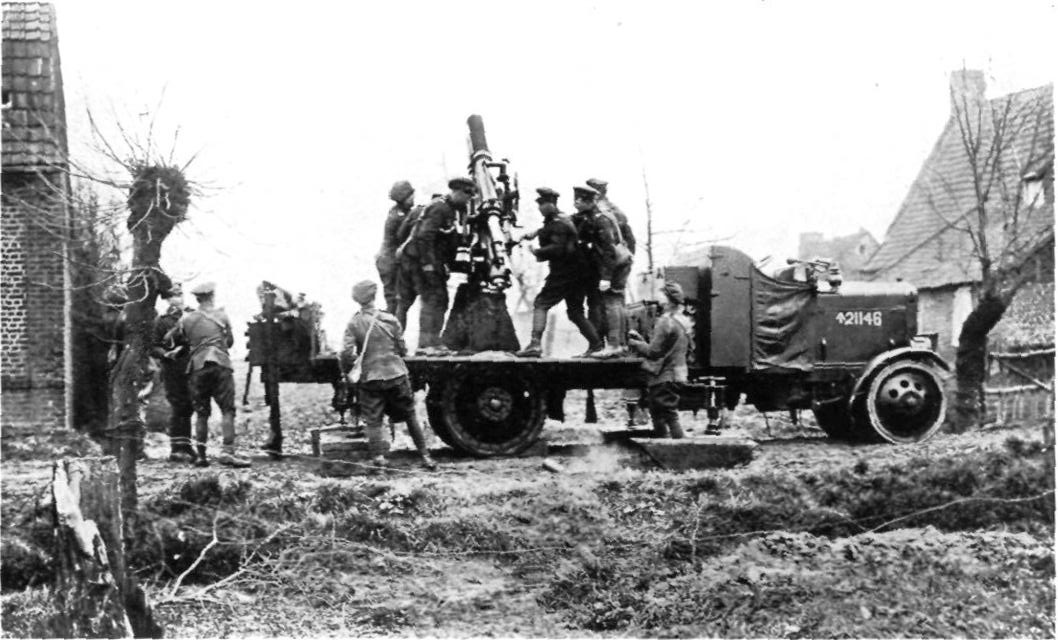
J Type 13-pounder 6 cwt self-propelled AA gun

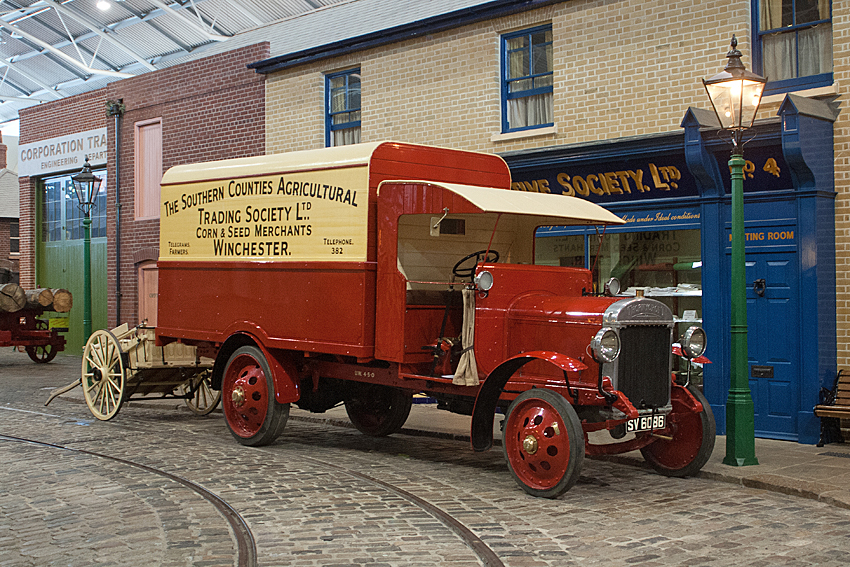
1917 J type lorry in the Milestones Museum

The J Type was designed by Thornycroft to meet a 1911 War Office specification for a 3-ton "subsidy scheme" cargo truck, the scheme provided a grant of £110 to civilian companies towards the purchase price of trucks suitable for military service, but included a provision that the military could requisition the vehicles if they required them. Initially the War Office purchased H, J and K Type chassis from Thornycroft, the first 24 being delivered August 1912 and May 1913 with further deliveries of all three type to follow, but in August 1914 the War Office settled on the J Type chassis. Over 5,000 were delivered to the British military during the war, some were supplied to Imperial forces, and it remained in British Army service until 1930. In the 1920s Thornycroft developed the X Type 3-ton chassis from the J Type.

== 13-pounder self-propelled AA gun ==
In order to provide mobile anti-aircraft defence, the British Army removed the QF 13-pounder gun from its field carriage and placed it on a high-angle pedestal creating the QF 13-pounder 6 cwt AA gun, it was usually mounted it on the rear of a lorry, 183 such self-propelled anti-aircraft (AA) guns were produced by Thornycroft on J Type chassis. The 6 cwt guns were later replaced by the improved QF 13-pounder 9 cwt on the same chassis and despite being introduced as a stopgap solution it saw service on the Western Front until the end of the war, it remained in Canadian Army service until 1930. The J Type 13-pounder self-propelled AA gun combination was very popular with its crews, being renowned for their reliability, although its very poor cross country performance was considered a failing.

== Surviving vehicles ==
A J type lorry No.14201 in running condition is in the collection of the Hampshire Cultural Trust having entered the collection of its predecessor, the Hampshire County Council museum service, around 1990. A second example is on display at the Milestones Museum in Basingstoke. A third example, fitted with a 13-pounder anti-aircraft gun, is in the collection of the Imperial War Museum.

== See also ==
- List of combat vehicles of World War I
