= QF 13-pounder 6 cwt AA gun =

QF 13 pounder 6 cwt anti-aircraft gun
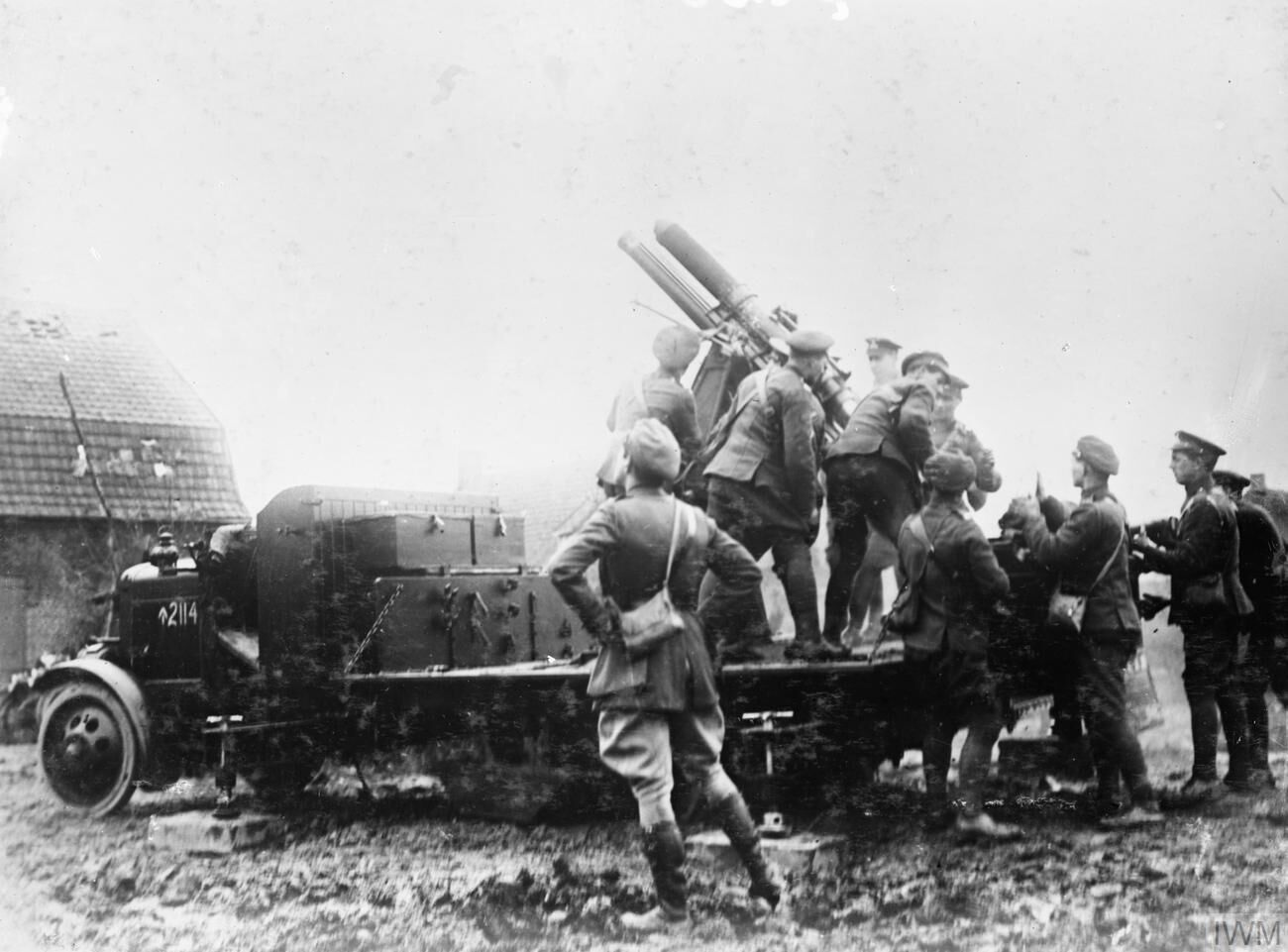
- On Mk II mounting on Thornycroft J Type lorry, Armentières March 1916
- Type: Anti-aircraft gun
- Place of origin: United Kingdom

Service history
- In service: 1915–1918
- Used by: British Empire
- Wars: World War I

Production history
- No. built: 20

Specifications
- Barrel length: Bore: 5 ft 9 in (1.753 m); Total: 6 ft 1 in (1.854 m)
- Shell: 12.5 lb (5.67 kg) Shrapnel; later HE
- Calibre: 3 in (76.2 mm)
- Recoil: hydro-spring, constant, 25 in (0.64 m)
- Carriage: high-angle mounting on lorry
- Elevation: 0°–70°
- Traverse: 360°
- Maximum firing range: 17,000 ft (5,200 m)

The Ordnance QF 13 pounder Mk III anti-aircraft gun, also known as 13 pounder 6 cwt, was an early British improvisation in World War I to adapt the QF 13-pounder field gun to anti-aircraft use. 6 cwt referred to the weight of barrel and breech (6 × 112 lb = 672 lb) to differentiate it from other "13 pounder" guns. (Note: In common terminology, they were classified by shell weight)

== History ==
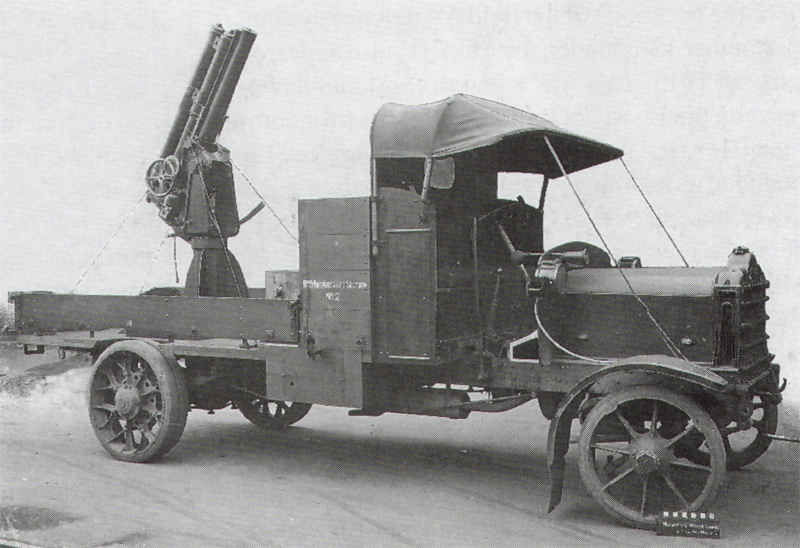
On Mk I mount, on a Daimler Mk 3 lorry

This was a standard QF 13 pounder field gun barrel and breech with the addition of a retaining catch to the breech to retain the round when loading at high angles.

It was first approved in October 1914 and was issued on Mk I high angle mounting, usually mounted on a motor lorry. The Mk I mounting had an additional recuperator housing mounted directly above the normal recuperator to facilitate gun runout at high angles. Hence the appearance was of a gun barrel with 2 slightly shorter tubes of similar diameter above it.

Mk II mount improved the usability, added deflection gear and the recoil system was improved so that the additional recuperator became unnecessary and was removed. On the Mk II mount the gun has the appearance of a standard 13 pounder.

The mount design was unusual in having both gunlayers on the left side.

Following World War I, the guns were returned to service as standard 13 pounder field guns.

== Combat use ==
The gun's performance was "ballistically poor" and it was only marginally effective against aircraft. It was relegated to minor war theatres and the 13 pounder 9 cwt and 3 inch 20 cwt guns took over the major anti-aircraft role. At the end of World War I there were only 20 of the guns in service worldwide, with 12 in Egypt and Palestine, 4 in Mesopotamia, 2 in Greece (Salonika front) and 2 on the Western Front.

== Performance ==
Performance of British World War I anti-aircraft guns
| Gun | muzzle velocity | Shell weight | Time to 5,000 ft (1,500 m) at 25° (seconds) | Time to 10,000 ft (3,000 m) at 40° (seconds) | Time to 15,000 ft (4,600 m) at 55° (seconds) | Max. height |
| QF 13 pounder Mk III | 1,600 ft/s (490 m/s) | 12.5 lb (5.7 kg) | | | | 17,000 ft (5,200 m) |
| QF 13-pounder 9 cwt | 1,990 ft/s (610 m/s) (Note: according to Routledge. Hogg & Thurston give 2,150 feet per second (655 m/s)) | 12.5 lb (5.7 kg) | 10.1 | 15.5 | 22.1 | 19,000 ft (5,800 m) |
| QF 12-pdr 12 cwt | 2,200 ft/s (670 m/s) | 12.5 lb (5.7 kg) | 9.1 | 14.1 | 19.1 | 20,000 ft (6,100 m) |
| QF 3-inch 20 cwt ( 1914) | 2,500 ft/s (760 m/s) | 12.5 lb (5.7 kg) | 8.3 | 12.6 | 16.3 | 23,500 ft (7,200 m) |
| QF 3 inch 20 cwt (1916) | 2,000 ft/s (610 m/s) | 16 lb (7.3 kg) | 9.2 | 13.7 | 18.8 | 22,000 ft (6,700 m) |
| QF 4-inch Mk V | 2,350 ft/s (720 m/s) | 31 lb (14 kg) (3 c.r.h.) | 4.4 [sic] | 9.6 | 12.3 | 28,750 ft (8,760 m) |

== See also ==
- List of anti-aircraft guns

== Bibliography ==
- Hogg, I.V.; Thurston, L.F. (1972). British Artillery Weapons & Ammunition 1914-1918. London: Ian Allan. ISBN 978-0-7110-0381-1.
- Routledge, Brigadier NW (1994). History of the Royal Regiment of Artillery. Anti-Aircraft Artillery, 1914-55. London: Brassey's. ISBN 978-1-85753-099-5.
