= QF 13-pounder 9 cwt =

QF 13 pounder 9 cwt anti-aircraft gun
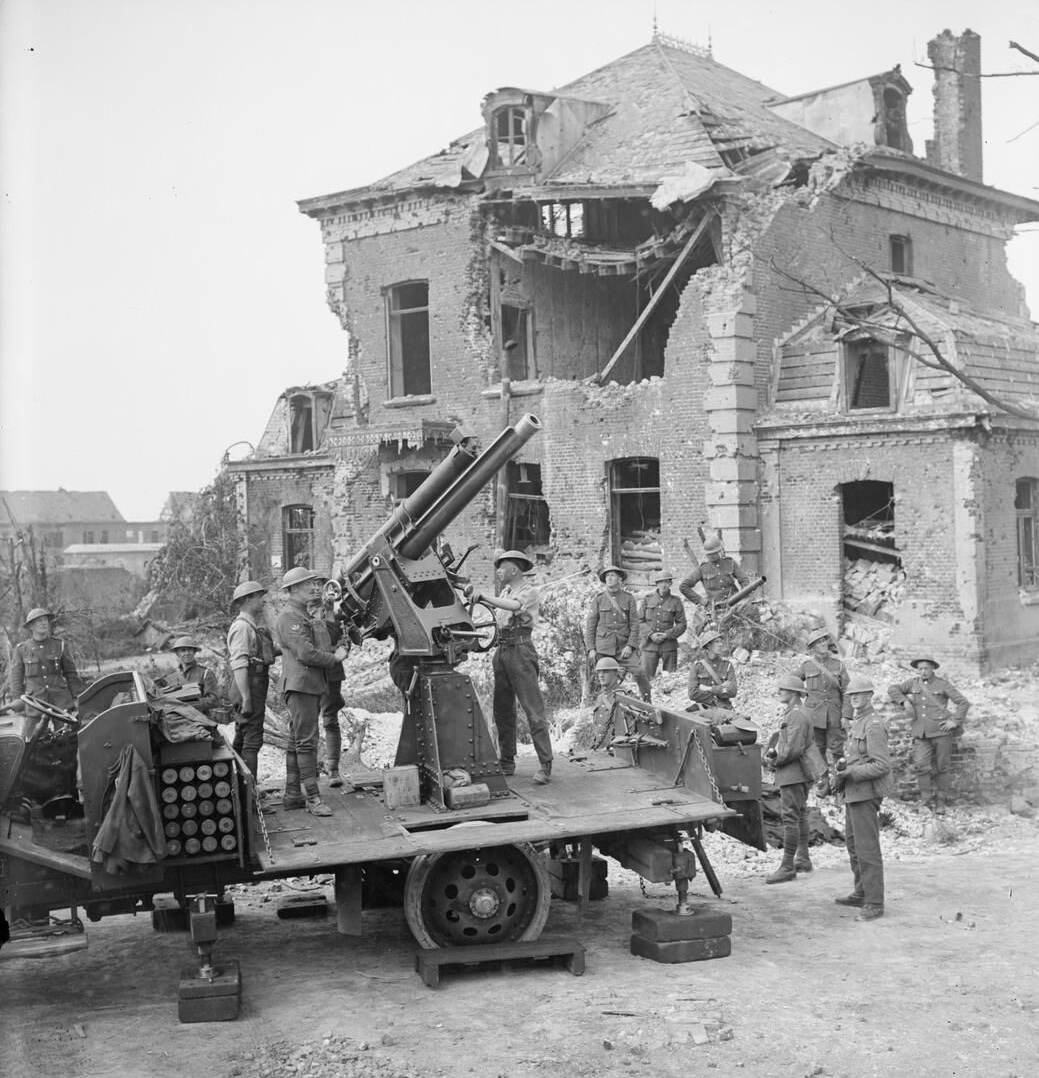
- QF 13 pdr 9 cwt on Mark IV mounting in Liévin, May 1918
- Type: Anti-aircraft gun
- Place of origin: United Kingdom

Service history
- In service: 1915–1920s
- Used by: British Empire
- Wars: World War I

Production history
- No. built: 306

Specifications
- Mass: 7.5 tons
- Barrel length: Bore: 7 feet 9 inches (2.36 m); Total: 8 feet 1 inch (2.46 m)
- Shell: 12.5 pounds (5.67 kg) Shrapnel; later HE
- Calibre: 3-inch (76.2 mm)
- Recoil: Hydro-spring, constant 24 inches (610 mm) (Mk III mount); 35 inches (889 mm) (Mk IV mount)
- Carriage: high-angle mounting on lorry
- Elevation: 0°–80°
- Traverse: 360°
- Rate of fire: 8 rds/min
- Muzzle velocity: 2,190 ft/s (670 m/s)
- Maximum firing range: 19,000 ft (5,800 m)

The 13 pounder 9 cwt anti-aircraft gun (Note: In the name, 13 pounder referred to the approximate weight of the standard shell, and 9 cwt referred to the weight of the barrel and breech (9 × 112 lb = 1008 lb), to differentiate it from other varieties of "13 pounder".) became the standard mobile British anti-aircraft gun of the World War I era, especially in theatres outside Britain.

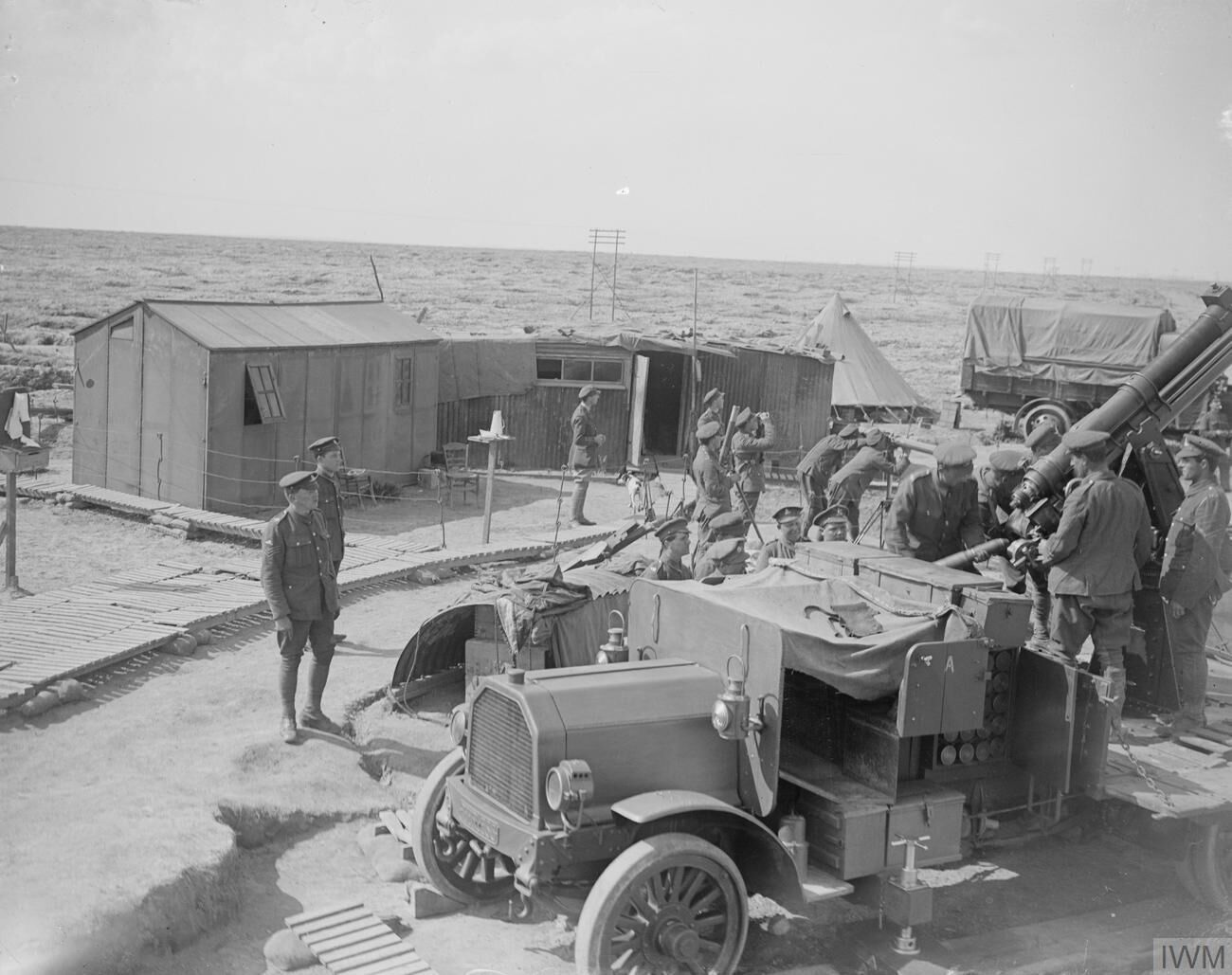
On a Peerless TC4 lorry during the Battle of Arras, May 1917

== History ==
Earlier anti-aircraft guns based on 13 pounder and 18 pounder guns proved unsatisfactory, primarily due to their low muzzle velocities. On 18 February 1915 Sir John French, commander of the British Expeditionary Force in France, asked for an anti-aircraft gun with a muzzle velocity of 2,000 feet per second (610 m/s). On 19 August 1915 the Army Council proposed adapting existing 18-pounder guns (3.3-inch bore) to use 13-pounder (3-inch) shells, thus meeting the requirement for higher velocity.

This weapon combined an 18 pounder breech and barrel with a liner (sleeve) inserted to reduce the bore from 3.3-inch (84 mm) to 3-inch (76 mm) so that it could fire the slightly smaller 13 pounder shell but still use the larger cartridge and propellant charge of the 18 pounder resulting in a much higher velocity. A slight neck was introduced in the 18 pounder cartridge to hold the slightly narrower 13 pounder shell in place.

The initial Mk III mounting was based on the 13 pounder Mk II anti-aircraft mounting, but proved to be not strong enough for the extra power of the 18 pounder cartridge.

The Mk IV mounting which followed raised the height by 9 inches (230 mm) and increased recoil from 24 to 35 inches (890 mm) and hence relieved the strain on the mounting.

Several guns are known to have been mounted on 2-wheeled high-angle field carriages and deployed on the Italian front. Hogg & Thurston state that they could theoretically be used as anti-aircraft guns, field guns or howitzers, but they were not officially introduced and may have been of an experimental nature. Routledge states that the carriage was improvised because some of 4th AA Group's guns had arrived in Italy without mountings.

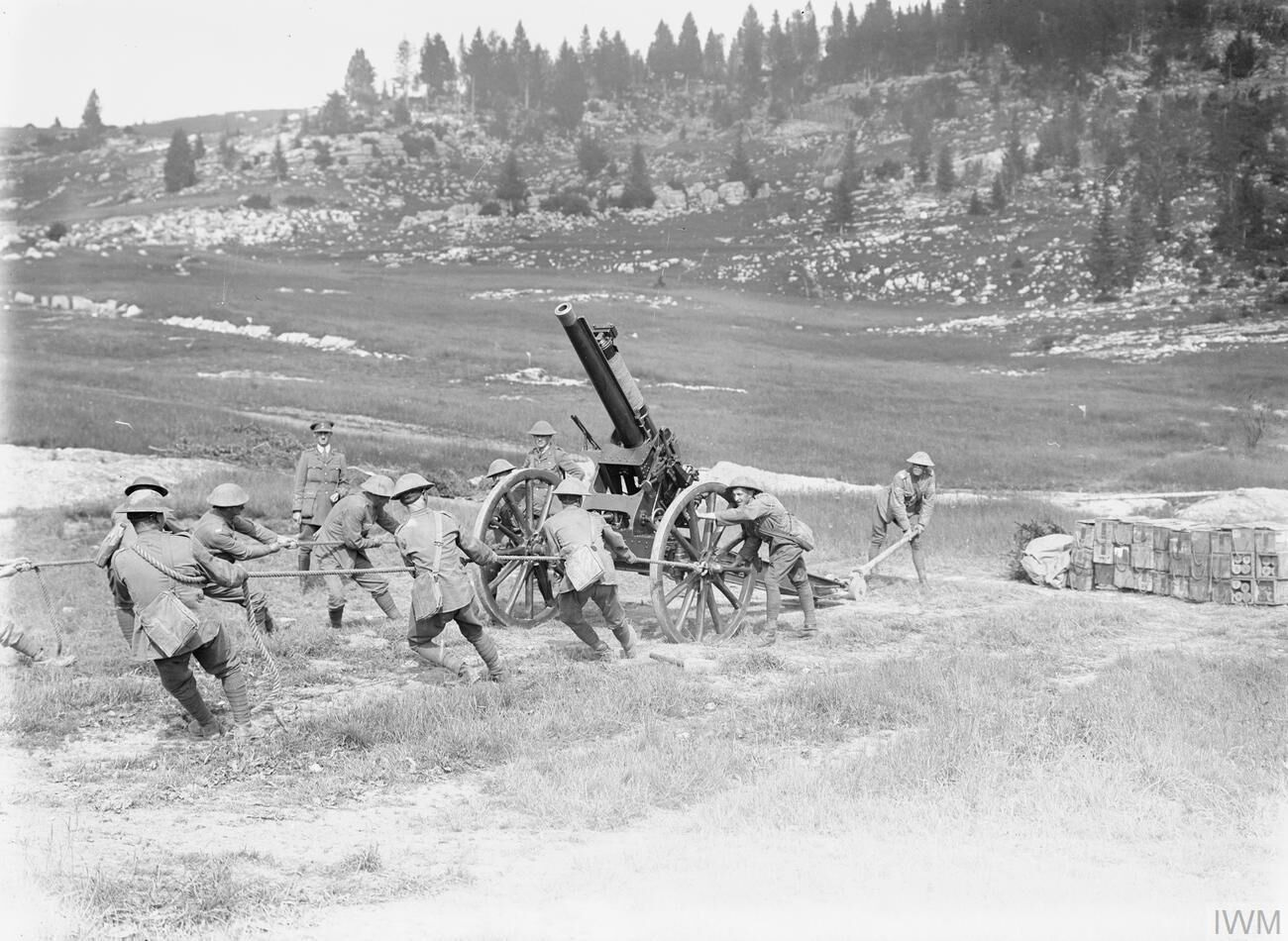
On an improvised field mount in Italy

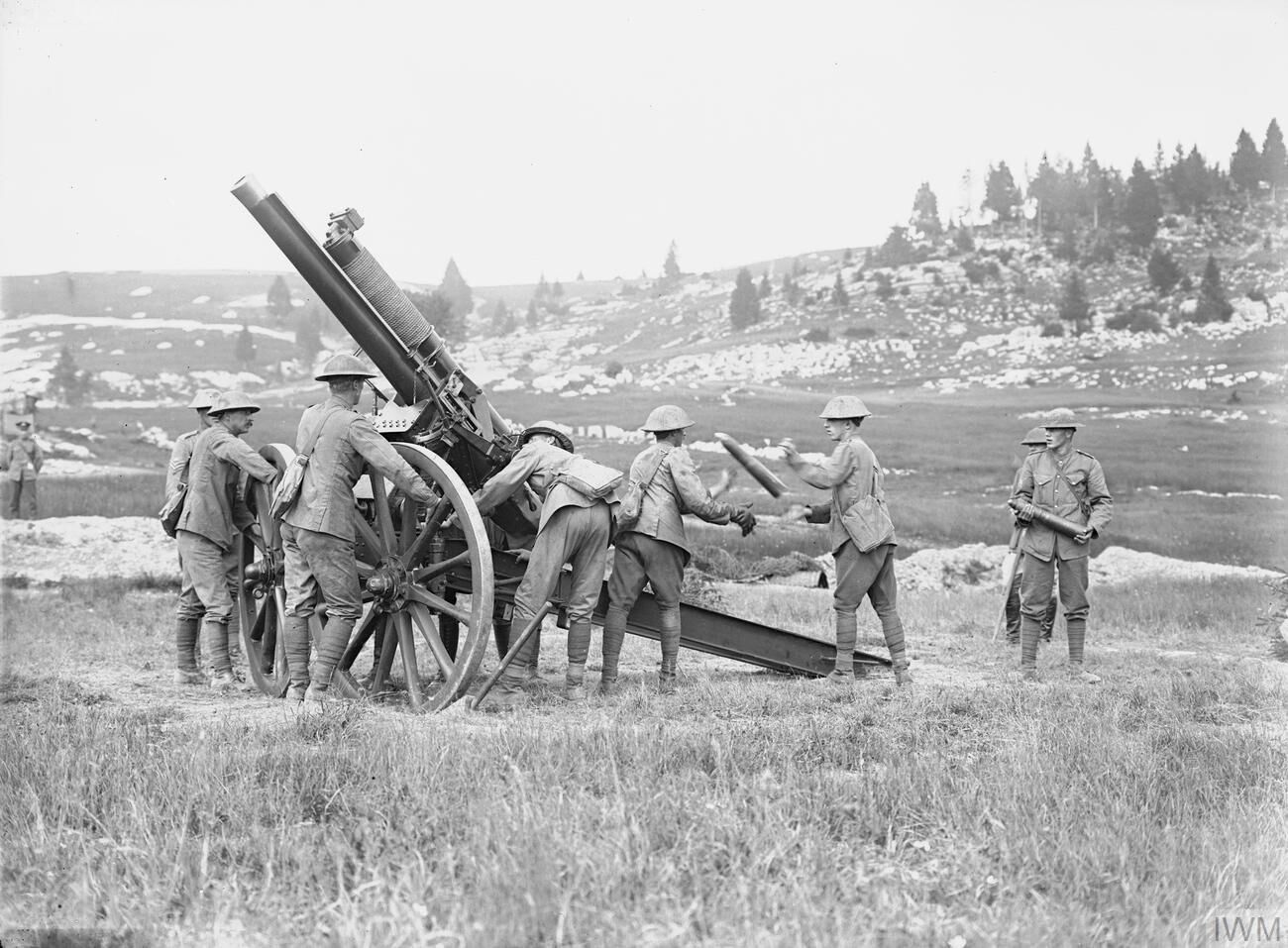

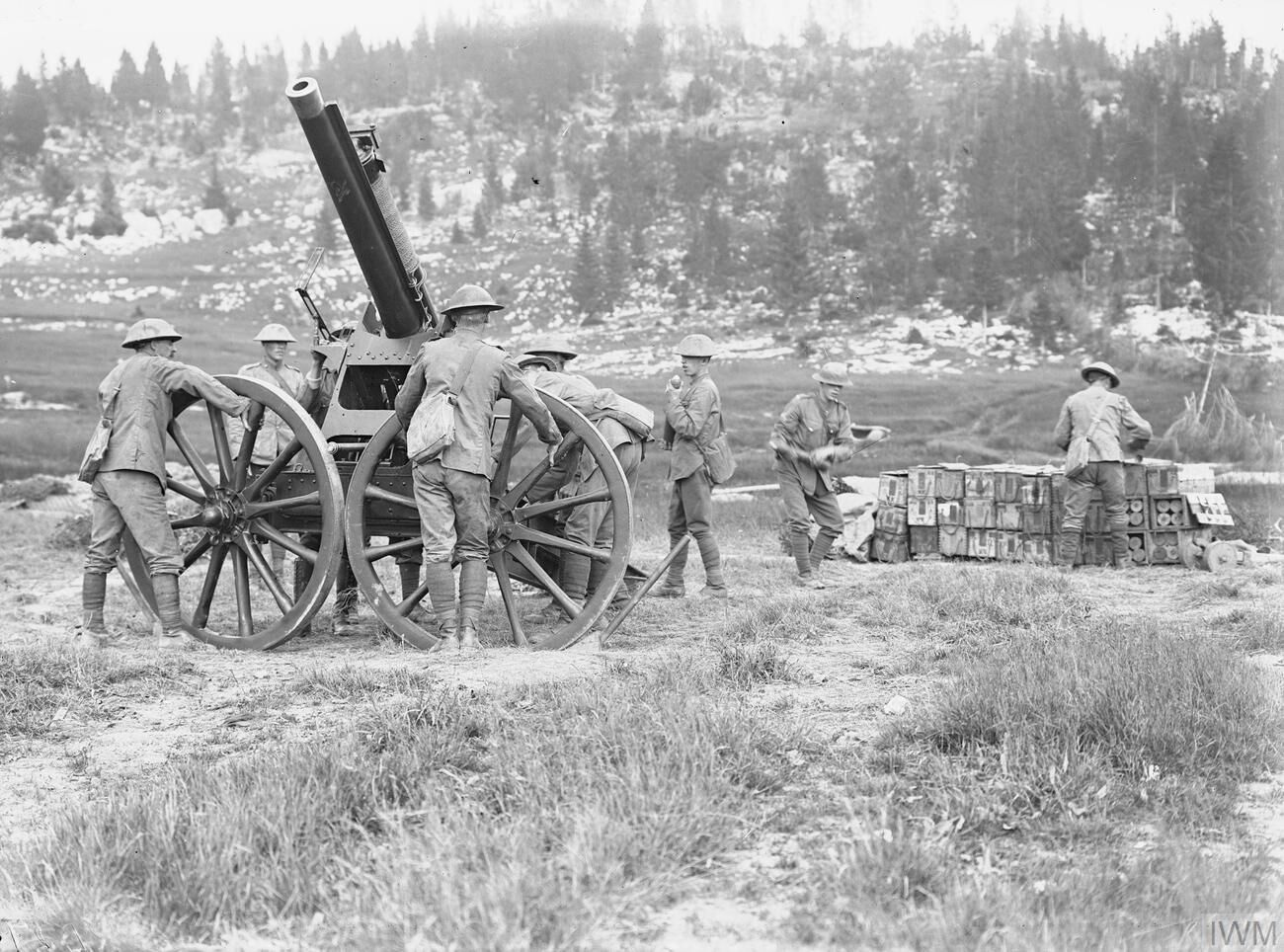

== Combat use ==
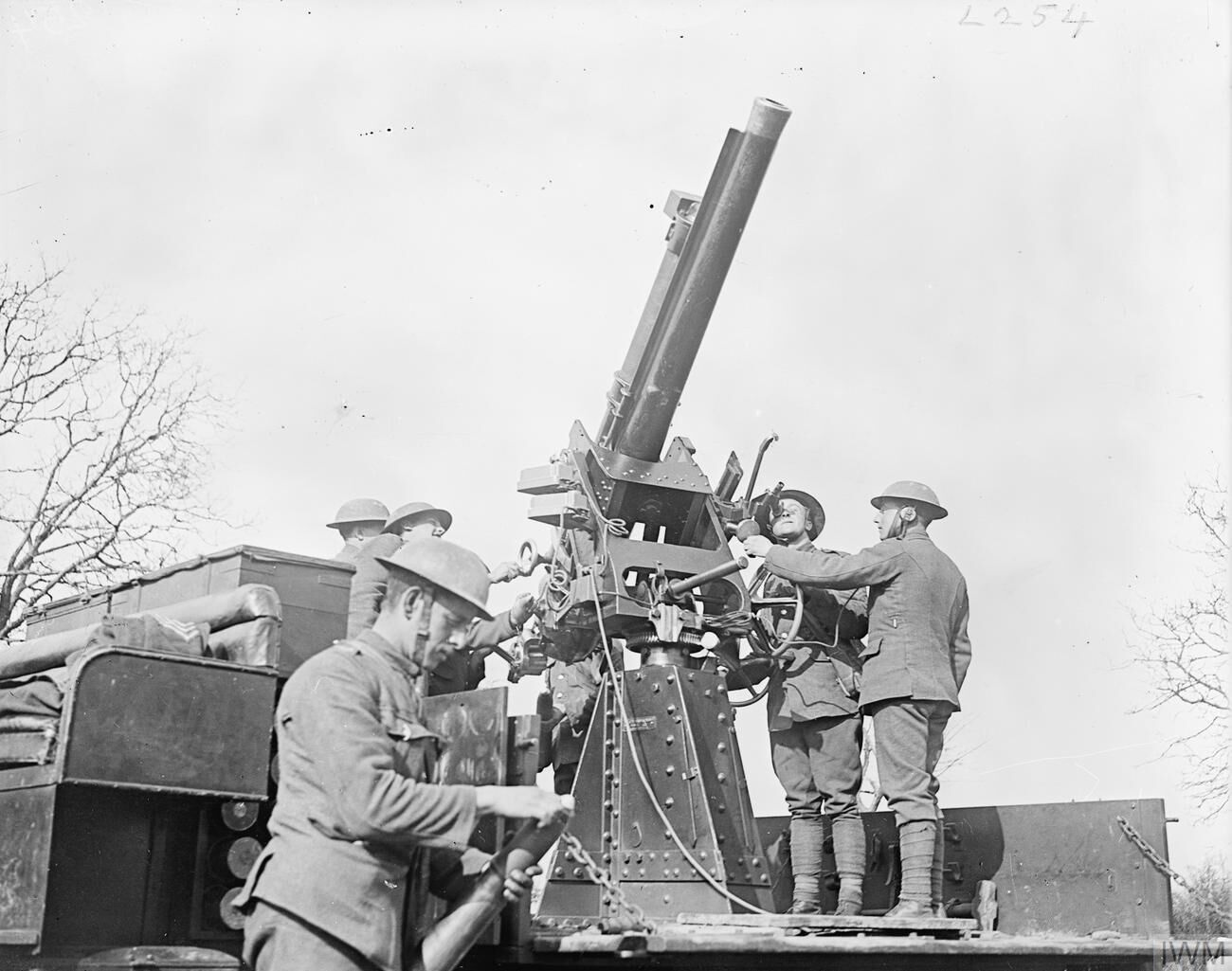
Gun on Mk IV mount in action at Cambrai, 13 March 1918

As World War I progressed, it was replaced in the home air defence of England (against German heavy bombers) by the more powerful QF 3 inch 20 cwt gun, but continued in all other theatres. It was usually deployed mounted on medium lorries such as the Thornycroft J Type with a speed of 18 miles per hour, in sections of 2 guns.

On the Western Front they were typically used to protect troop columns, airfields, bases, supply dumps and observation balloons.

As important as the raw performance of the gun itself was the new technology being developed to allow fast calculation of aircraft height and predict where it would be when the shell arrived near it. Modern aircraft could fly at over 100 miles per hour and to 20,000 ft (much lower over the battlefield) by 1918, which made the old reliable artillery shooting techniques obsolete. The shell took 10.1 seconds to reach 5,000 ft (1,500 m) fired at 25° above horizontal, 15.5 seconds to reach 10,000 ft (3,000 m) at 40°, 22.1 seconds to reach 15,000 ft (4,600 m) at 55°. Hence the aircraft position had to be calculated 10–22 seconds in advance and fuzes needed to be set to explode at the correct height.

By the end of World War I, a 13 pounder AA Section was accompanied by 2 Wilson-Dalby Trackers with a rudimentary electronic computer to provide tachymetric prediction, a UB2 rangefinder, a Height/Fuze Indicator (HFI), and an Identification telescope. German fighters countered by attacking at a low level—a few hundred feet. AA guns would continue to fire but the shells would then explode over the heads of those they were defending. But it brought attacking aircraft within range of defensive machine guns. Few aircraft were directly shot down, each requiring an average of 4,000–4,500 shells,[1] but guns were often employed in aerial barrages to deny airspace to aircraft rather than to simply shoot down individually targeted aircraft. Brigadier Routledge notes that "in the BEF [i.e. on the Western Front] stress was laid on long-range deterrent fire; indeed in Fourth Army this was the BRA's stated policy. 'Kills' were therefore less common. Moreover, gun and fighter zones were not separated, as in Britain, and this made set plans for action less workable".[2]

Routledge further comments that in World War I British cooperation between infantry and anti-aircraft sections was generally rudimentary. However, he points out a successful integration in the Allied advance on the Piave in Italy in late 1918, where S and V Batteries of the 4th AA group used their 13 pdr 9 cwt guns to provide mobile air and ground fire in close support of infantry. This tactic later became common in World War II.[3]

At the end of World War I, a total of 306 were in service worldwide, 232 of these on the Western Front (out of a total of 348 AA guns there).[4]

== Performance ==
Comparison of British anti-aircraft guns of the First World War
Gun	muzzle velocity (ft/s)	Shell weight	Time to 5,000 ft (1,500 m) at 25° (seconds)	Time to 10,000 ft (3,000 m) at 40° (seconds)	Time to 15,000 ft (4,600 m) at 55° (seconds)	Max. height
QF 13 pounder 6cwt Mk III	1600	12.5 lb (5.7 kg)	?	?	?	17,000 ft (5,200 m)
QF 13 pounder 9 cwt	2100	12.5 lb (5.7 kg)	10.1	15.5	22.1	19,000 ft (5,800 m)
QF 12 pdr 12 cwt	2200	12.5 lb (5.7 kg)	9.1	14.1	19.1	20,000 ft (6,100 m)
QF 3 inch 20 cwt 1914	2500	12.5 lb (5.7 kg)	8.3	12.6	16.3	23,500 ft (7,200 m)
QF 3 inch 20 cwt 1916	2000	16 lb (7.3 kg)	9.2	13.7	18.8	22,000 ft (6,700 m)
QF 4 inch Mk V	2350	31 lb (14 kg)	4.4??	9.6	12.3	28,750 ft (8,760 m)

== See also ==
- List of anti-aircraft guns

== Surviving examples ==
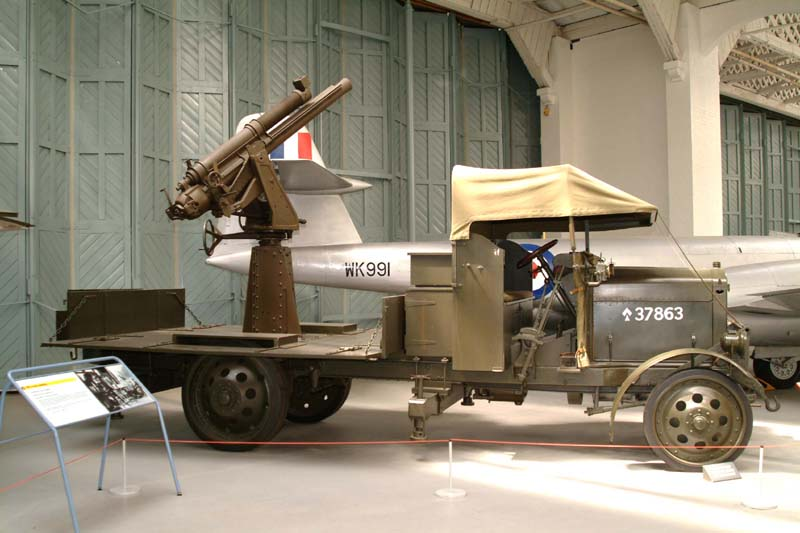
Restored gun on Mk III mount on Thornycroft lorry, at Imperial War Museum Duxford

- 13 pdr 9 cwt on Mk III mounting on a Thornycroft J Type lorry at Imperial War Museum Duxford, UK.

== Bibliography ==
- Official History of The Ministry of Munitions, 1922. Volume X The Supply of Munitions. Part VI Anti-Aircraft Supplies. Facsimile reprint by Imperial War Museum and Naval & Military Press 2007. ISBN 1-84734-884-X
- General Sir Martin Farndale, History of the Royal Regiment of Artillery. Western Front 1914–18. London: Royal Artillery Institution, 1986. ISBN 1-870114-00-0.
- General Sir Martin Farndale, History of the Royal Regiment of Artillery : Forgotten Fronts and the Home Base 1914–18. London:The Royal Artillery Institution, 1988. ISBN 1-870114-05-1
- I.V. Hogg & L.F. Thurston, British Artillery Weapons & Ammunition 1914–1918. London:Ian Allan, 1972. ISBN 978-0-7110-0381-1
- Brigadier NW Routledge, History of the Royal Regiment of Artillery. Anti-Aircraft Artillery, 1914–55. London: Brassey's, 1994. ISBN 1-85753-099-3
