= QF 12-pounder 12 cwt AA gun =

Ordnance QF 12 pounder 12 cwt anti-aircraft gun
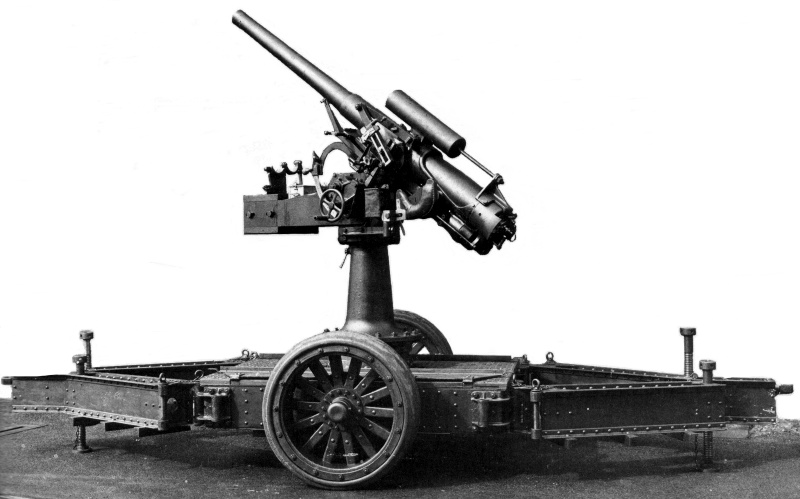
- Mk I* on World War I AA traveling platform mounting
- Type: Anti-aircraft gun
- Place of origin: United Kingdom

Service history
- In service: 1914–1918 (as land AA gun)
- Used by: United Kingdom; Kingdom of Italy; Empire of Japan
- Wars: World War I World War II

Production history
- Designed: 1893
- Manufacturer: Elswick Ordnance Company; Vickers
- Variants: Mk I, Mk II

Specifications
- Barrel length: 12 ft (3.7 m)
- Shell: Fixed or separate QF 12.5 lb (5.7 kg)
- Calibre: 3 inch (76.2 mm)
- Breech: single-motion screw
- Recoil: Hydro-spring, constant, 12 in (300 mm)
- Elevation: 0° - 85°
- Traverse: 360°
- Muzzle velocity: 2,200 ft/s (670 m/s)
- Maximum firing range: 20,000 ft (6,100 m)

The 12 pounder 12 cwt anti-aircraft gun was a British anti-aircraft gun of the First World War, The guns were QF 12 pounder 12 cwt naval guns taken from coast defence positions with the addition of a modified cradle for higher elevation, a retaining catch for the cartridge, and an additional spring recuperator above the barrel and high-angle sights. Writers commonly refer to it simply as "12 pounder anti-aircraft gun". 12 cwt referred to the weight of the barrel and breech - 1,344 lb (610 kg) - to differentiate it from other 12-pounder guns.

== History ==
When World War I began Britain had no anti-aircraft artillery and had given little thought to it. Hence in 1914 when Germany occupied parts of Belgium and northern France, it faced the risk of air attack, and various medium caliber guns were adapted to high-angle mountings, including the 12 pdr 12 cwt. All QF 12 pounder ammunition at the time was "Separate loading QF" i.e. the propellant came in a brass cartridge case with primer ready installed, but the shell was loaded separately. For anti-aircraft firing, Fixed QF rounds were quickly developed i.e. with the shell already attached to the cartridge case. This allowed slightly faster loading.

== Combat use ==
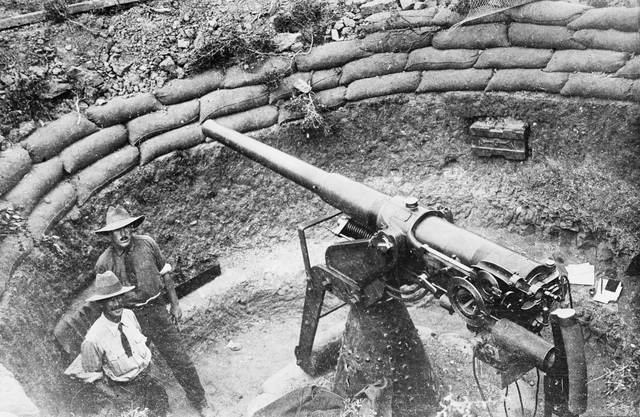
12 pdr 12 cwt gun in use as improvised anti-aircraft gun on garrison mounting, Gallipoli 1915

For home air defence the gun was typically mounted on a high-angle mounting with an additional spring recuperator above the barrel, on a 2-wheel towed travelling platform, 7 ft (2.1 m) × 5 ft 4 in (1.63 m) The 4 stabilizing arms at the corners were swung out, rods at the ends screwed down to lift the platform off the wheels which were then removed and the platform lowered to the ground. It was also deployed on static mountings to defend prominent targets such as dockyards.

While the gun was much lighter than the QF 3 inch 20 cwt AA gun, for anti-aircraft use it lacked its range and shell weight. Hence the 3 inch 20 cwt gun became the preferred heavy AA gun on land and ships from 1914 to 1937. The 12 pdr 12 cwt also proved only marginally superior to the much lighter QF 13 pounder 9 cwt as a light AA gun. Comparison:-

Gun	Muzzle velocity	Shell weight	Time to 5,000 ft (1,500 m) at 25° (seconds)	Time to 10,000 ft (3,000 m) at 40° (seconds)	Time to 15,000 ft (4,600 m) at 55° (seconds)	Max. height
13-pdr 9 cwt	1,990 ft/s (607 m/s)	12.5 lb (5.7 kg)	10.1	15.5	22.1	19,000 ft (5,800 m)
12-pdr 12 cwt	2,200 ft/s (670 m/s)	12.5 lb (5.7 kg)	9.1	14.1	19.1	20,000 ft (6,100 m)
3-inch 20 cwt 1914	2,500 ft/s (760 m/s)	12.5 lb (5.7 kg)	8.3	12.6	16.3	23,500 ft (7,200 m)
3-inch 20 cwt 1916	2,000 ft/s (610 m/s)	16 lb (7.3 kg)	9.2	13.7	18.8	22,000 ft (6,700 m)

At the end of World War I, 36 guns were still in service in the home air defense of Britain, 10 on the Western Front and 2 in Mesopotamia where it was typically mounted on river barges. The gun remained in Royal Navy anti-aircraft use, in the form of the new Mk V version, on smaller ships in World War II because of its low and high angle firing.

== Ammunition ==
Mk II & Mk III cartridges, 1914 - original separate QF	Mk IV Common Lyddite AA shell, 1914

== See also ==
- List of anti-aircraft guns
- QF 12 pounder 12 cwt naval gun

== Bibliography ==
- I.V.Hogg & L.F. Thurston, British Artillery Weapons & Artillery 1914-1918. London: Ian Allan, 1972. ISBN 978-0-7110-0381-1
- Brigadier NW Routledge, History of the Royal Regiment of Artillery. Anti-Aircraft Artillery, 1914-55. London: Brassey's, 1994. ISBN 1-85753-099-3
