= QF 13-pounder gun =

Ordnance QF 13-pounder
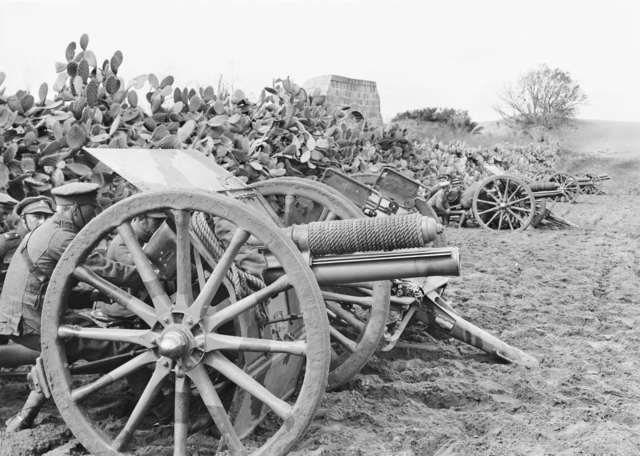
- Battery and detachments of the Honourable Artillery Company (HAC) near Belah, Palestine, March 1918
- Type: Light field gun
- Place of origin: United Kingdom

Service history
- In service: 1904–1940 (UK)
- Used by: British Empire
- Wars: World War I, Easter Rising, World War II

Production history
- No. built: 416
- Variants: Mk I, Mk II

Specifications
- Mass: Barrel & breech 685 lb (311 kg); Total 2,236 lb (1,014 kg)
- Barrel length: Bore 5 ft 8 in (1.73 m); Total 6 ft (1.8 m)
- Crew: 9
- Shell: Fixed QF 76.2 x 313 mm R
- Shell weight: 12.5 lb (5.7 kg) Shrapnel, later HE
- Recoil: Hydro-spring, constant, 41 in (1.0 m)
- Carriage: Wheeled, pole trail
- Elevation: -5°to +16°
- Traverse: 4° L & R
- Muzzle velocity: 1,675 ft/s (511 m/s)
- Maximum firing range: 5,900 yd (5,400 m)

The Ordnance QF 13-pounder (Note: British artillery denoted guns by the weight of its standard projectile, in this case approximately 13 pounds (5.9 kg), and mortars and howitzers by calibre.) (quick-firing) field gun was the standard equipment of the British and Canadian Royal Horse Artillery at the outbreak of World War I.

== History ==
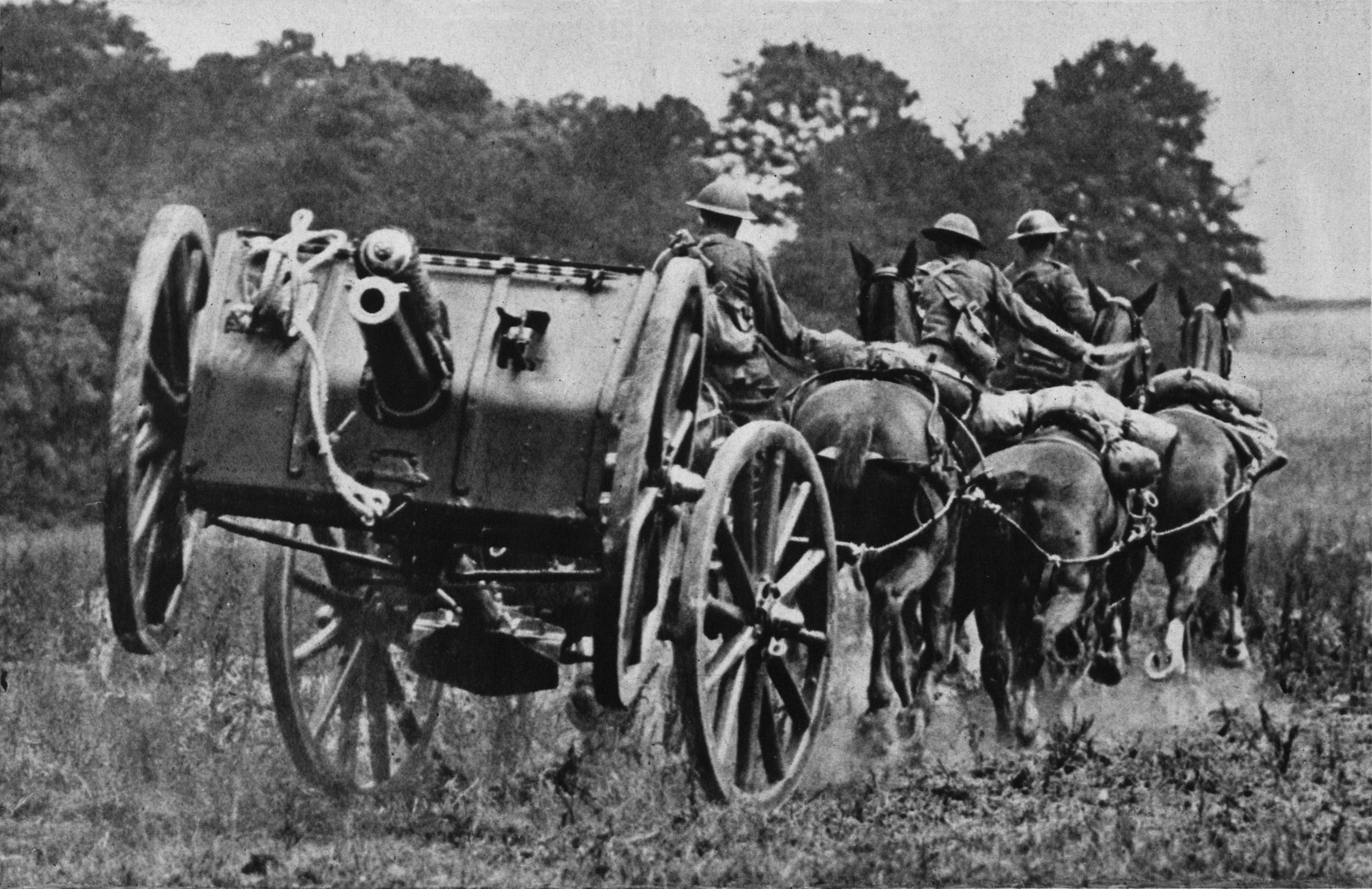
Photo showing gun team galloping into action

The QF 13-pounder was developed as a response to combat experience gained in the Boer War and entered service in 1904, replacing the Ehrhard QF 15-pounder and BL 12-pounder 6 cwt. It was intended as a rapid-firing and highly-mobile, yet reasonably powerful, field gun for Royal Horse Artillery (RHA) batteries supporting Cavalry brigades, and was expected to be engaged in mobile open warfare. It was developed in parallel with the QF 18-pounder used by Royal Field Artillery.

The original Mk I barrel was wire wound. Later Mk II barrels had a tapered inner A tube which was pressed into the outer tube. A hydro-spring recoil system was mounted above the barrel. The carriage was a pole trail type with two seats for the gunners and a protective shield.

The first British artillery round on the Western Front in World War I was fired by No. 4 gun of E Battery Royal Horse Artillery on 22 August 1914, northeast of Harmignies in Belgium.

It saw action at the Battle of Le Cateau in August 1914 as the British Expeditionary Force retreated from Mons.

It was used by "L" Bty, Royal Horse Artillery in the defensive action at Néry, France, on 1 September 1914, for which three Victoria Crosses were awarded. The medals, and No. 6 gun and limber involved in this action, are held in the collection of the Imperial War Museum.

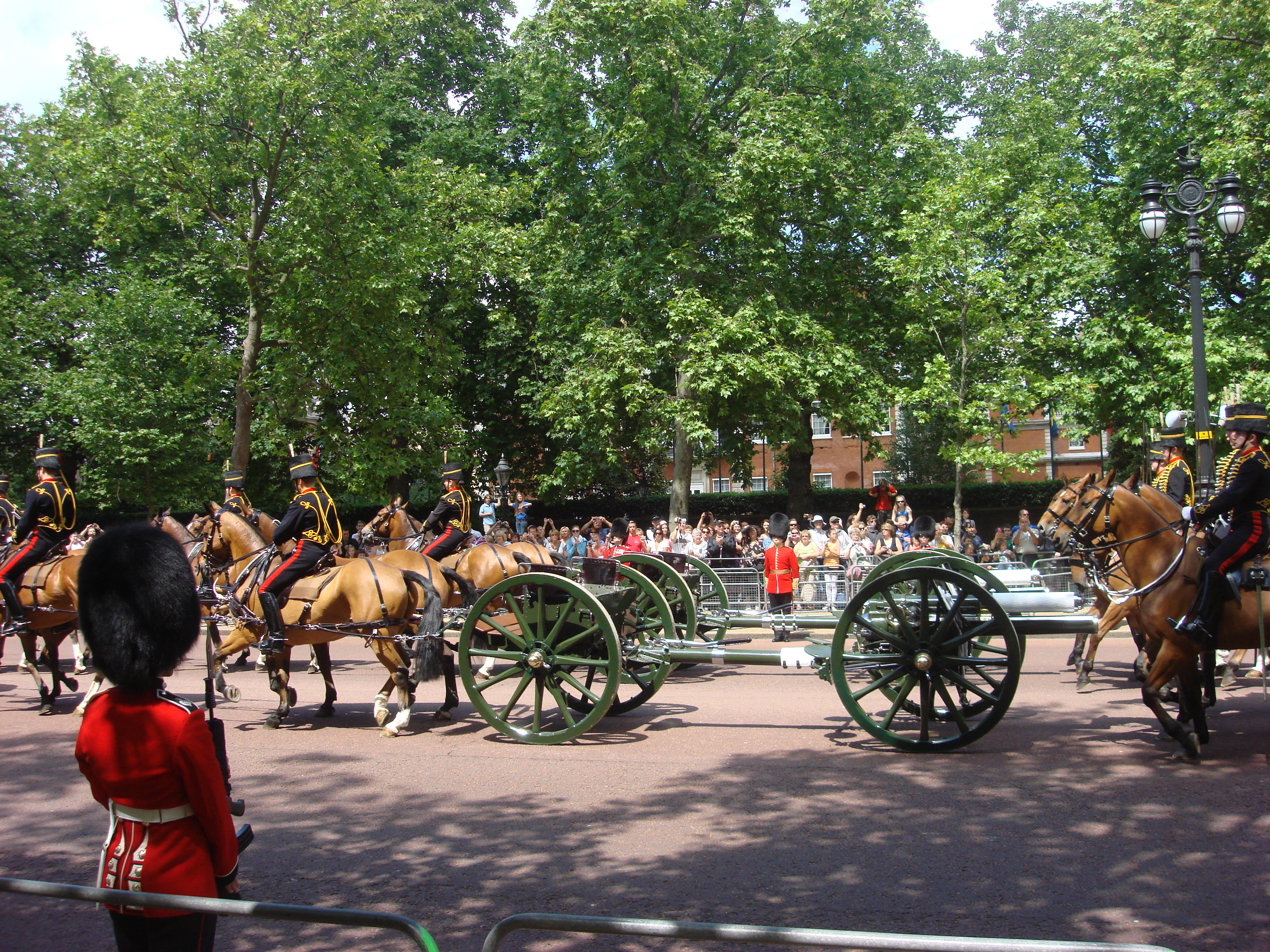
13-pdr state saluting guns of the King's Troop, Royal Horse Artillery at the 2009 Trooping the Colour

From late 1914, when the Western Front settled into trench warfare, the 13-pounder was found to be too light to be truly effective against prepared defensive positions. As a result, a few RHA batteries that were not supporting cavalry formations converted to 18-pounder guns and 4.5-inch howitzers. However, it was retained in the British and Canadian cavalry brigades on the Western Front. and also used throughout the war in batteries (both RHA and Territorial Force) supporting cavalry and mounted formations in Palestine and Mesopotamia.

Batteries normally carried 176 rounds per gun. The gun and its filled limber (24 rounds) weighed 3,368 lb (1,528 kg) and was towed by a six-horse team. All members of the gun detachments were mounted on their own horses.

As the war progressed the increasing air activity created a requirement for a medium anti-aircraft gun. Some 13-pounders were slightly modified to become "Ordnance QF 13 pdr Mk III" and mounted on high-angle mounts to produce what became known as the 13-pounder 6 cwt anti-aircraft gun.

In 1940, some 13-pounders were brought out of store for use as emergency anti-tank guns, mounted in pill boxes, for the home defence of Britain against possible German invasion.

For combat purposes the gun is obsolete, but remains in service with the King's Troop, Royal Horse Artillery for ceremonial purposes and as state saluting guns.

== 13-pounder 6 cwt QF Mark V naval gun ==
This was a pedestal-mounted adaptation by Vickers Limited of the Mark I horse artillery gun, intended to arm the Royal Navy's new Motor Launches in World War I. 650 examples were constructed, including 250 made in the United States. Because of the German U-boat campaign, many of the guns were used on defensively equipped merchant ships, some being removed from motor launches for that purpose.

== Ammunition ==
Mk II Shrapnel round	No. 80 T. & P. (Time and Percussion) Fuze	Shrapnel shell on display at the Australian War Memorial, Canberra; 234 balls, 41/lb (90/kg)	Sectioned high explosive round, which contained 9oz 4dr (262 gm) Amatol explosive (white area). Cartridge held 1 lb 3.9 oz (536 gm) Cordite propellant (simulated with bundle of cut string). Shell from the Imperial War Museum collection.

== Surviving examples ==
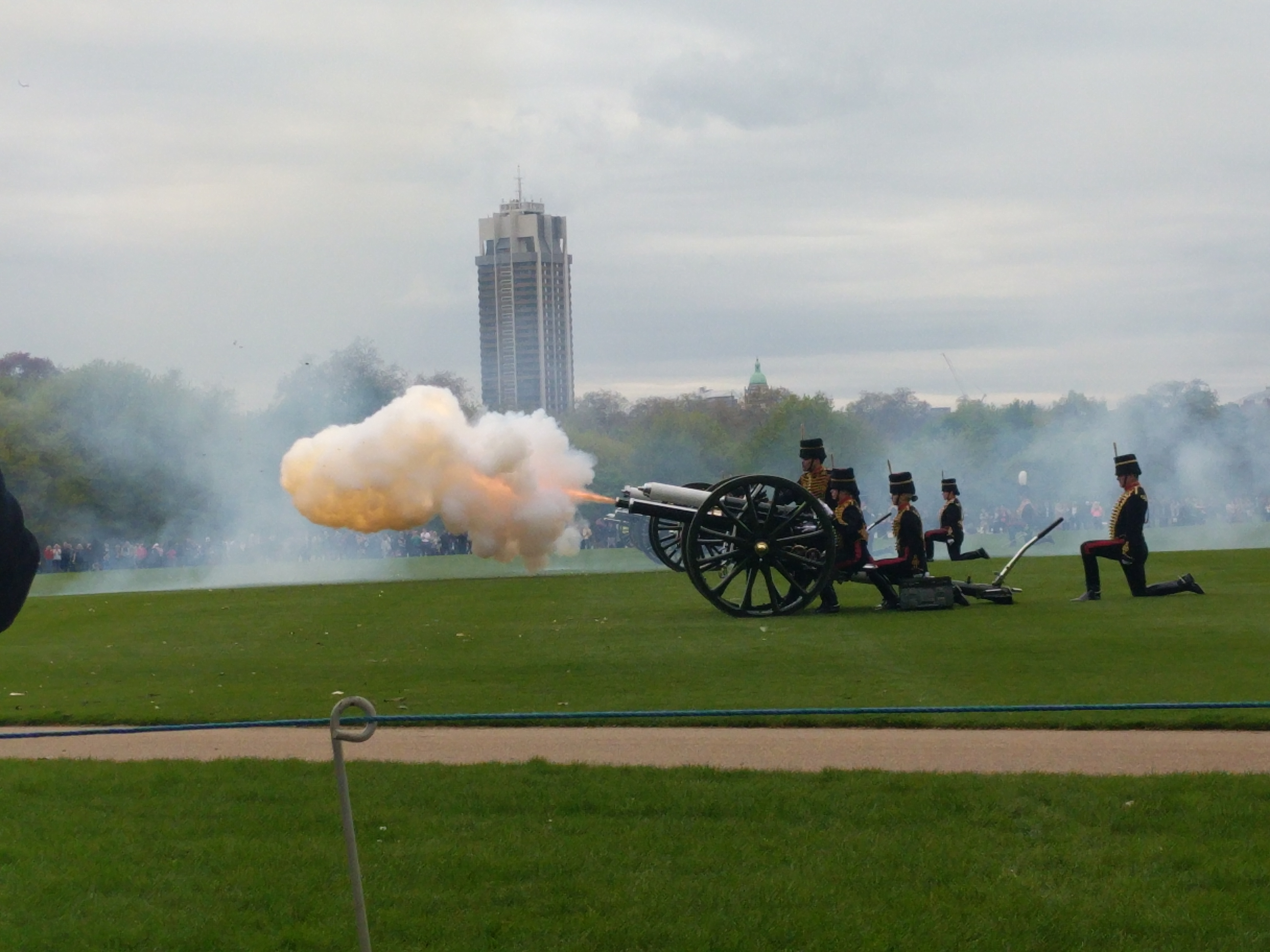
A 13-pounder of the King's Troop, Royal Horse Artillery, firing a gun salute in Hyde Park, London in April 2018.

- With the King's Troop, Royal Horse Artillery, London
- Imperial War Museum collection:

The Néry Gun and limber, used during the action at Néry, 1 September 1914.
No.4 Gun, E Battery Royal Horse Artillery; fired the first British artillery round on the Western Front, August 1914.

- Cart and Wagon Shed heritage centre, Shoeburyness
- Canadian War Museum, Ottawa
- Fort de Seclin – 1914/1918 Museum (near Fromelles)
- Musee des Abris, Albert, France. (Mk. 2)
- There are six examples in South Africa:
  - One restored in 2009,
  - One at THA HQ in Johannesburg,
  - Two with the NFA in Durban,
  - Two at the National Memorial in Potchefstroom.
- Mark V naval gun recovered from a sunken merchant ship, is on display at the harbour in Scarborough, North Yorkshire.
- There is one example on display in the Tsumeb Museum in Namibia. The gun was used by the THA at the Battle of Sandfontein on 26 September 1914 and was captured by German troops and later dumped into Lake Otjikoto prior to the German surrender in June 1915.
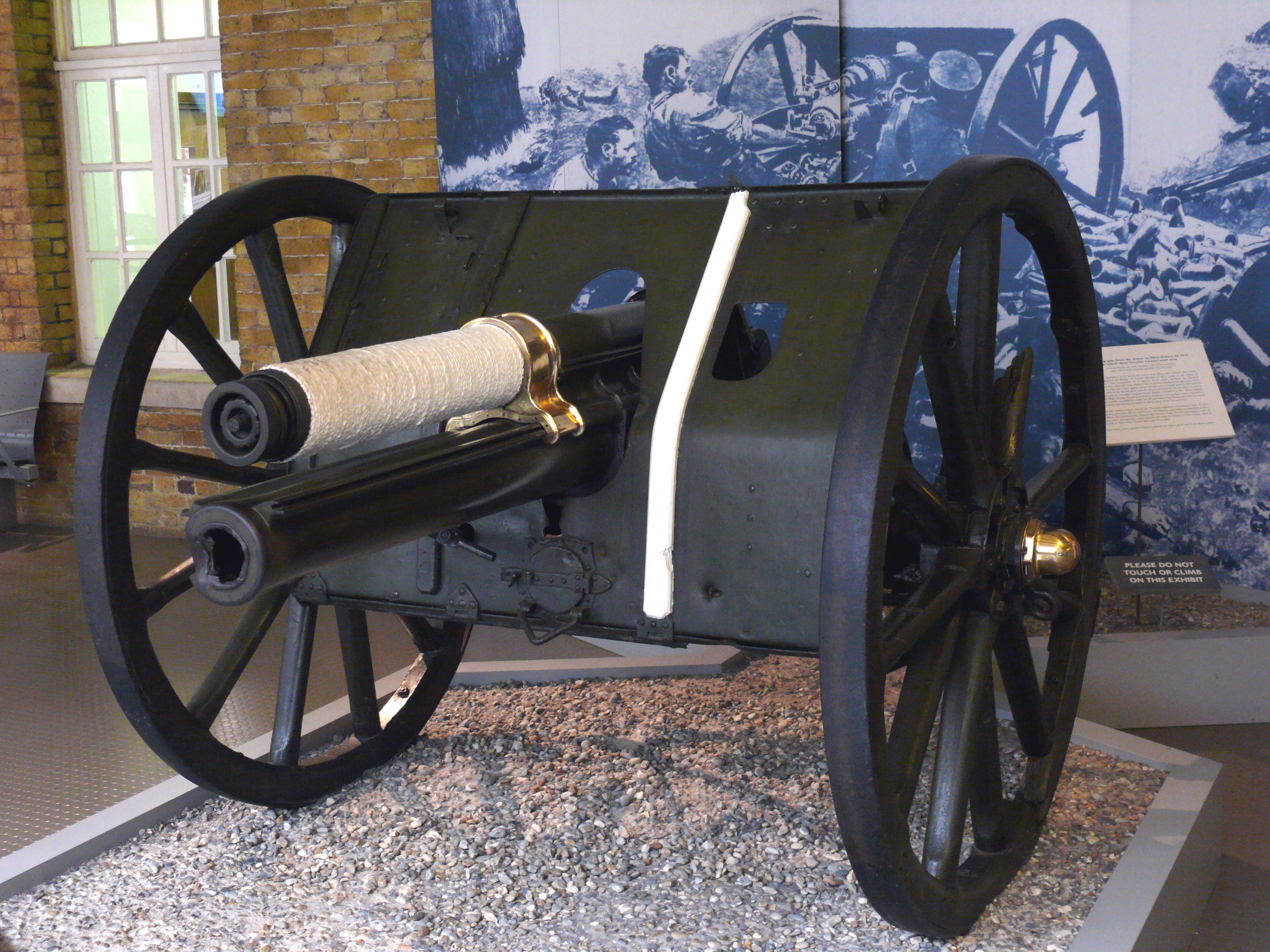
The Néry Gun, on display at IWM London

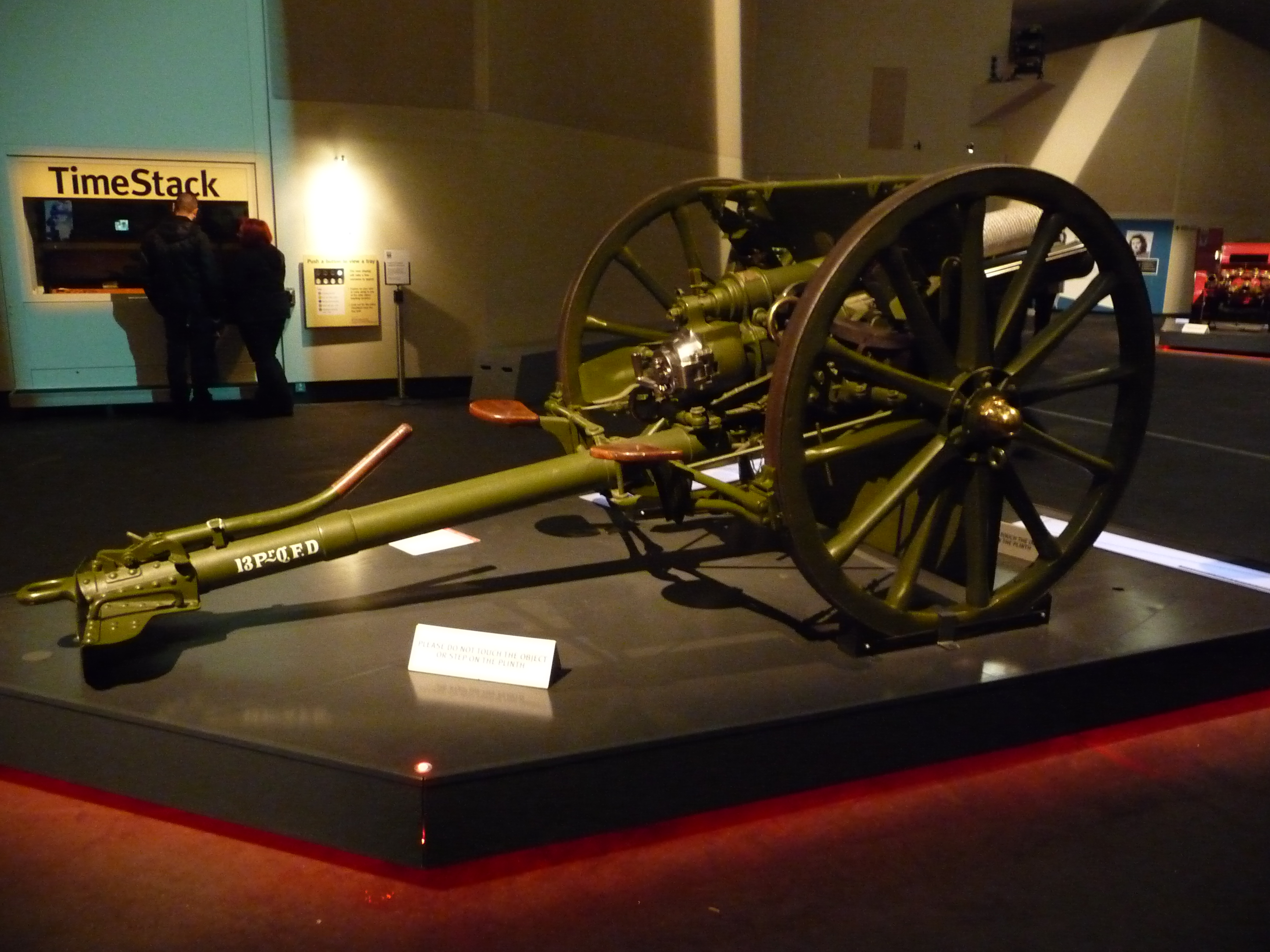
No 4 Gun E Battery RHA, on display at IWM North

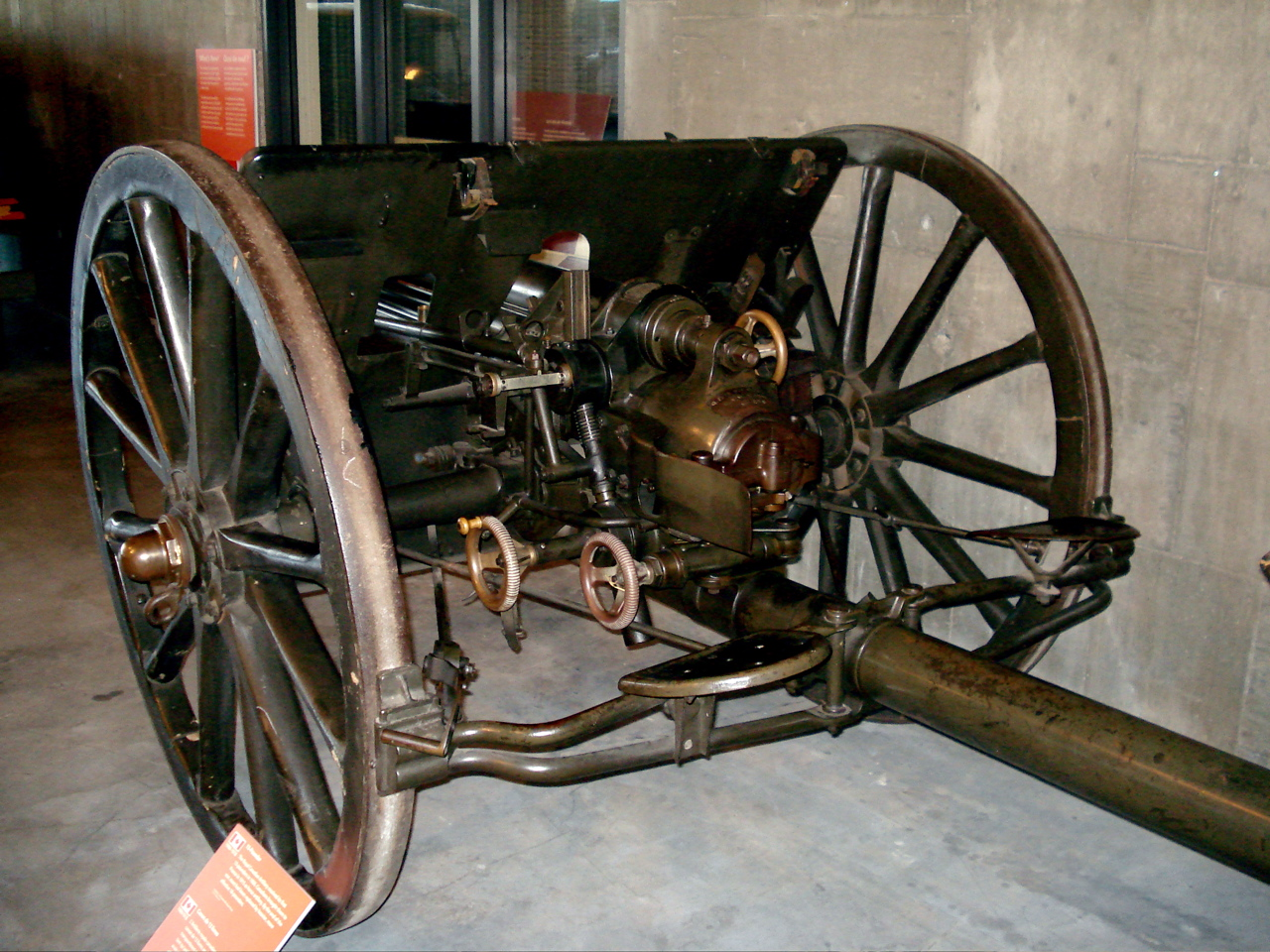
13-pounder at the Canadian War Museum

== Popular culture ==
A QF 13-pounder features in the Big Guns (Dad's Army), where it is supplied to the Walmington-on-Sea platoon for home defence.

== See also ==
- Edward Kinder Bradbury
- George Thomas Dorrell
- David Nelson
- List of field guns
- QF 13-pounder 6 cwt AA gun: WWI improvised anti-aircraft version
- QF 13-pounder 9 cwt: later WWI anti-aircraft version (18-pounder gun modified to fire 13-pounder shell with 18-pounder cartridge)

== Bibliography ==
- Clarke, Dale (2004). British Artillery 1914-19 Field Artillery. Oxford: Osprey. ISBN 1-84176-688-7.
- Clarke, Dale (2014). World War I Battlefield Artillery Tactics. Oxford: Osprey. ISBN 978-1-78200-590-2.
- Hogg, Ian V. (1998). Allied artillery of World War One. Marlborough: Crowood Press. ISBN 1-86126-104-7.
- Cruickshank, Dan, Invasion – Defending Britain from Attack. Boxtree, 2001 ISBN 0-7522-2029-2
- General Sir Martin Farndale, History of the Royal Regiment of Artillery Western Front 1914–18. Published by Royal Artillery Institution, 1986. ISBN 1-870114-00-0
- General Sir Martin Farndale, History of the Royal Regiment of Artillery, The Forgotten Fronts and the Home Base 1914–18, Published by Royal Artillery Institution, 1988. ISBN 1-870114-05-1
- Friedman, Norman (2011). Naval Weapons of World War One. Seaforth Publishing. ISBN 978-1-84832-100-7.
- I.V. Hogg & L.F. Thurston, British Artillery Weapons & Ammunition 1914–1918. published by Ian Allan, London, 1972.
