= Locomobile-Riker Model B =

- British Army Model B lorry
- Type: 3-6–ton truck
- Place of origin: United States

Service history
- In service: 1915–1918
- Used by: British Empire & United States
- Wars: First World War

Production history
- Designer: Andrew L. Riker
- Designed: 1915
- Manufacturer: Locomobile Company of America
- Produced: 1915–1922

Specifications
- Mass: 4.78 short tons (4.34 t; 4.27 long tons)
- Length: 21 ft 7 in (6.58 m) total 12 ft 6 in (3.81 m) wheelbase
- Width: 7 ft 1 in (2.16 m)
- Crew: 1
- Passengers: 2
- Engine: 340 cu in (5,572 cc); 4-cylinder petrol 28.9 bhp (21.6 kW) (Note: S.A.E. or N.A.C.C. horsepower rating.)
- Drive: 4x2
- Transmission: 4-forward, 1-reverse
- Suspension: Leaf springs
- References: Gosling, Pullen, Vanderveen & Ware

The Locomobile-Riker Model B was a truck model manufactured by the American firm Locomobile Company of America from 1915 to 1922. Originally called the Locomobile Model B, in 1916 the company rebranded their truck line, adopting the marque Riker, and the model was renamed the Riker Model B.

The Locomobile-Riker Model B was used in large numbers by the militaries of the British Empire and the United States during the First World War, with almost 3,000 being delivered to the two powers during the war.

== Design ==
The Model B was a cab behind engine, rear-wheel drive truck that was available with payload capacities of 3, 4, 5 and 6 short tons (2.68, 3.57, 4.46 and 5.36 long tons; 2.72, 3.63, 4.54 and 5.44 t), (Note: Some sources state the Locomobile Model B had a 3 and 4 ton payload capacities.) the only difference between the trucks being the strength of their springs. The Model B was available in two chassis lengths, the standard had a 12 ft 6 in (3.81 m) wheelbase (Note: Some sources state the 12 ft 6 in (3.81 m) wheelbase was the only produced chassis.) and the long chassis had an increased 14 ft 2 in (4.32 m) wheelbase. Military versions of the Model B were 21 ft 7 in (6.58 m) in overall length, 7 ft 1 in (2.16 m) in width and weighed 4.78 short tons (4.27 long tons; 4.34 t).

The Model B was powered by a 340 cu in (5,572 cc) 4-cylinder inline 28.9 hp (21.6 kW) T-head petrol engine with a bore and stroke of 4 1/4 in × 6 in (108 mm × 152 mm). Early Model Bs were fitted with a brass radiator that had a honeycomb core, in British military service these were found to be susceptible to cracking, so from 1916 a cast aluminium radiator was fitted with a number of improved features which proved far more reliable. The truck was driven through a four-speed transmission, they were fitted with a dry disc clutch and the rear axle featured worm final drive, an unusual feature for American trucks of that weight class at the time. Bronze castings were used in both the gearbox and the lower parts of the engine, a feature common with Locomobile's luxury passenger cars, and an indication of the quality build standard of the Model B range. The Model B had 36 in × 5 in (914 mm × 127 mm) wheels with solid rubber tyres (dual wheels on the rear), and was fitted with rear drum brakes.

== History ==
Locomobile-Riker Model Bs at Locomobile's Bridgeport factory being readied for their road test

5 ton Locomobile-Riker Model B

The Locomobile Company of America was formed in 1899 by two partners, Amzi L. Barber and John B. Walker, and in 1902 they hired an engineer, Andrew L. Riker, formerly of the Riker Electric Motor Company, (Note: Andrew Riker started building electric vehicles in 1896, he founded the Riker Electric Motor Company in 1898 and sold it to the Electric Vehicle Company in 1899. The company produced delivery vans, hansom cabs and trucks.) who in time would become the company's president. Initially Locomobile offered steam powered vehicles but Riker was hired to assist the company develop their internal combustion engines, and in 1903 they released their first petrol motor powered vehicle.

In 1912 the Locomobile Company released their first commercial vehicle, the Model A, which was a cab over engine 5 ton truck model (Note: Some sources state the Locomobile Model A had a 6 ton payload capacity.) with chain driven rear wheels. The US Army Corps of Engineers purchased at least 40 Model As and used by them for a number of large construction projects.

In 1915 the Locomobile Company replaced the Model A with a new model, the Model B, available in 3, 4, 5 and 6 ton versions. The biggest changes were the adoption of cab behind engine configuration and worm final drive. With the introduction of the Model B, Locomobile became the second American truck manufacturer (after Pierce-Arrow) to produce heavy trucks with worm driven rear axles, but Riker believed he had an improved upon Pierce-Arrow's design.

In November 1916, Locomobile changed the name of their truck line to Riker, and from then on the Model B was marketed as the 'Riker Model B'. At the time the company stated this was to assist customers to differentiate between their cars and trucks, and to recognise Andrew Riker's contributions to the company, but it is considered likely they wanted the Locomobile marque reserved for their luxury car line and not associated with commercial vehicles.

In 1919 the Locomobile Company went into receivership and in 1920 it became part of the Hare's Motors group, (Note: The Hare's Motors group comprised three major marques, Locomobile, Mercer and Simplex.) owned by former Packard vice-president Emlen S. Hare. Within a year Hare's Motors was experiencing financial difficulties, and in 1922 Locomobile was purchased by William C. Durant and incorporated into his Durant Motors group. Upon the takeover by Durant Motors the Riker marque was discontinued and production of the Model B ceased.

=== Military service ===
British Army Model B fitted with a double-deck bus body from an LGOC B Type

Upon the outbreak of the First World War, the British War Office realised British automotive manufacturers would be incapable of producing sufficient motor lorries to meet the needs of the British Empire's militaries, and they sought additional supplies from the United States. After the Model B's introduction in 1915, the War Office imported several 4 ton Model Bs through Locomobile's UK agents, Gaston, Williams and Wigmore, and had them tested by the War Office's Mechanical Transport branch. The War Office were impressed by the Model B and immediately drew up contacts for more. In British military service the Model B was rated for payloads of 3 long tons (3.4 short tons; 3.0 t), (Note: In First World War British military service, lorries with a civilian payload capacity of 4 to 5 long tons (4.5 to 5.6 short tons; 4.1 to 5.1 t) frequently had a military payload rating of 3 long tons (3.4 short tons; 3.0 t). This was due to a variety of reasons including the rigours of military operations, the propensity for drivers to overload the vehicles, and commercial trucks not needing to account for a crew of three and all of their kit.) and by the time of the Armistice in 1918 the War Office had acquired 1,192. This number included the confiscated contents of a merchant ship loaded with Locomobile trucks that was bound for Germany via a neutral country before being intercepted by the Royal Navy. British Model Bs were shipped to the United Kingdom as bare rolling chassis and fitted with locally made bodies in Britain. Most were fitted with General Service (GS) bodies, but some were fitted with a 500 imp gal (600 US gal; 2,300 L) cylindrical water tank and others equipped with a water purification apparatus. In France a number of Model Bs were fitted with double-deck bus bodies that had been removed from LGOC B Type buses, (Note: Early in the War, the British War Office shipped 1,185 LGOC B Type buses to France to use as troop transports, but desperate for stores transports a number had their bus bodies removed and were converted into General Service trucks.) the Model Bs were then used as troop transports on the Western Front capable of transporting 25 troops and their kit. Subsequently, after all double-deck bus bodies had been used, the Army Service Corps built single deck charabanc-style bodies and fitted these to Model Bs. Despite the adoption of the Riker marque in 1916, in British service Model Bs were always referred to under their original Locomobile marque.

US Army Model B in France

The first US military use of Locomobile-Riker Model Bs occurred in 1916, when 67 were included in the motor column of the punitive Pancho Villa Expedition, commanded by General John J. Pershing. During the expedition 30 of the Model Bs had steel flanges fitted to their wheels to enable them to drive on railway lines, and they were used to great effect transporting personnel and stores on the railways that ran through Texas and New Mexico towards Mexico. Upon the US entry to the First World War in 1917, the US Army placed orders for additional Model Bs. By the time of the Armistice in 1918, 1,690 Model Bs had been received by the US Army, 1,351 of which had arrived in France. In US service they were referred to under the Riker marque.

After the war British Model Bs were repatriated to the United Kingdom where they were sold to the general public. In 1919 the US government sold all US manufactured vehicles in France to the French government, who then promptly on sold them to private buyers and companies. The Paris-based company Laurent purchased a large numbers of former US Army Model Bs and after refurbishing them, sold them to the public.
