= Overman Wheel Company =

Late 1800s U.S. bicycle manufacturer

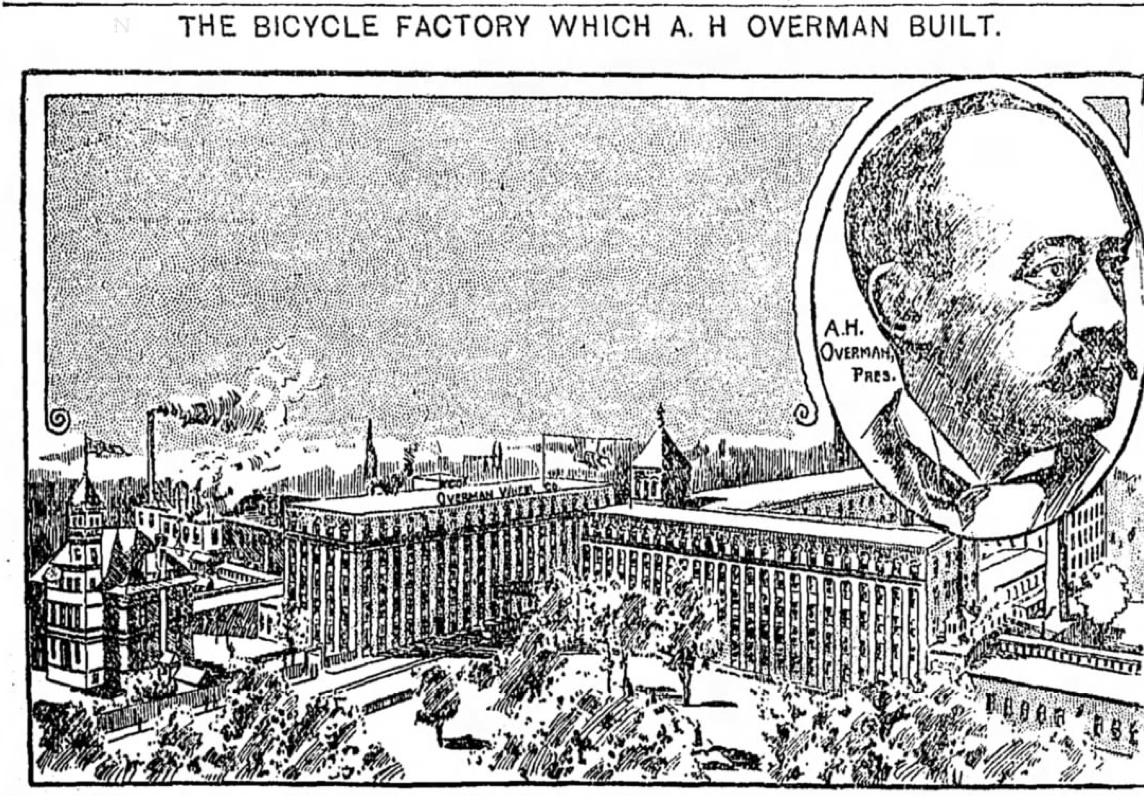
- The Overman factory
- Industry: Bicycle manufacture
- Founded: 1882; 144 years ago
- Founder: Albert H. Overman
- Fate: Sold in 1900; 126 years ago
- Headquarters: Chicopee Falls, Massachusetts
- Products: Bicycles; later, sporting goods
- Brands: Victor Flyer

Overman Wheel Company was an early bicycle manufacturing company in Chicopee Falls, Massachusetts from 1882 to 1900. It was known for bicycles of higher quality and lower weight than other bicycles of its time. Despite a nationwide bicycle craze in the late 1800s, the company was undercut by lower-priced competition, nearly went bankrupt in 1897, and never recovered from an 1899 fire. The company was sold in 1900.

== History ==
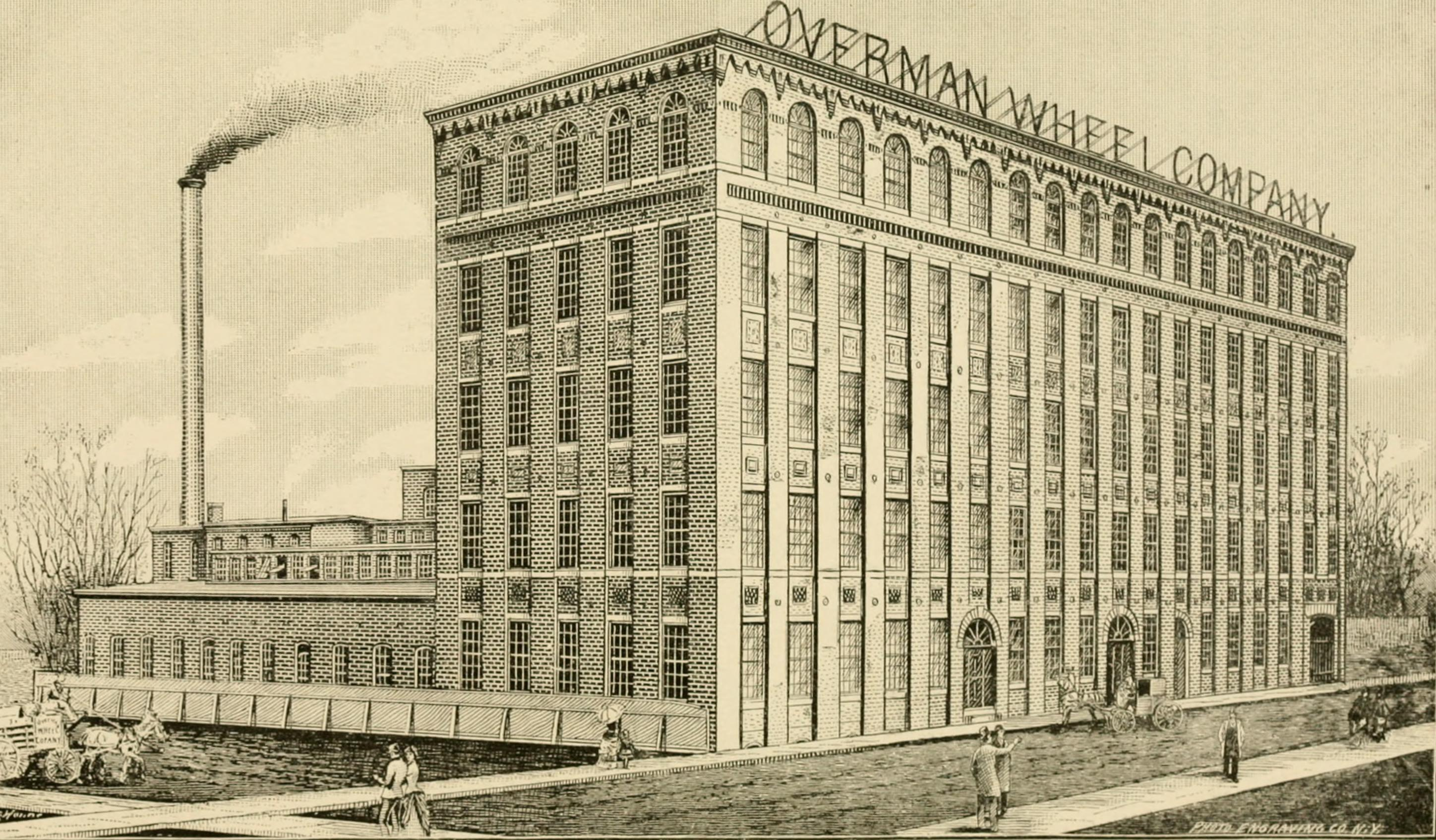
A concise illustration of the Overman Wheel Company around 1890.

Albert Overman started the Overman Wheel Company in 1882 in Chicopee Falls, Massachusetts with an investment of $62,000.

Overman were the first American manufacturers of the safety bicycle. In 1888 the company began making its own bicycles, with a staff of about thirty men. At its height, the factory employed about 1,400 men in five buildings. The factory produced 80,000 bicycles per year, the only bicycle factory at the time which made the entire bicycle.

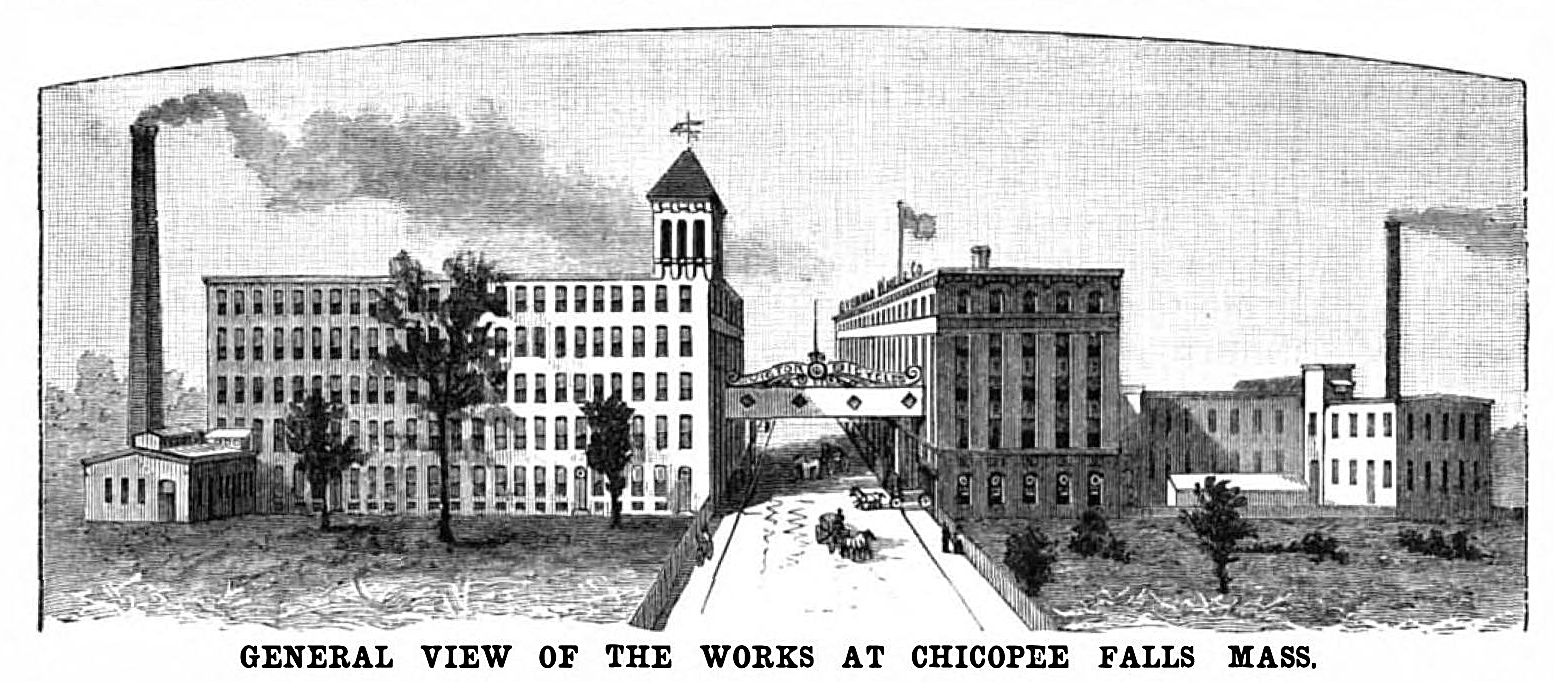

== Victor Bicycle ==
Victor bicycles

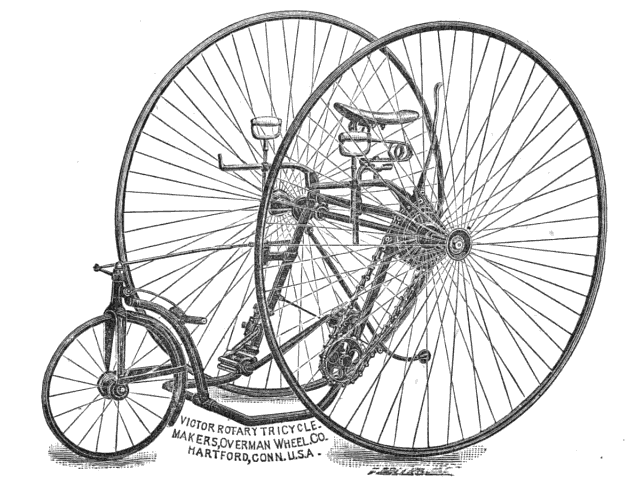
1883 Victor Rotary tricycle

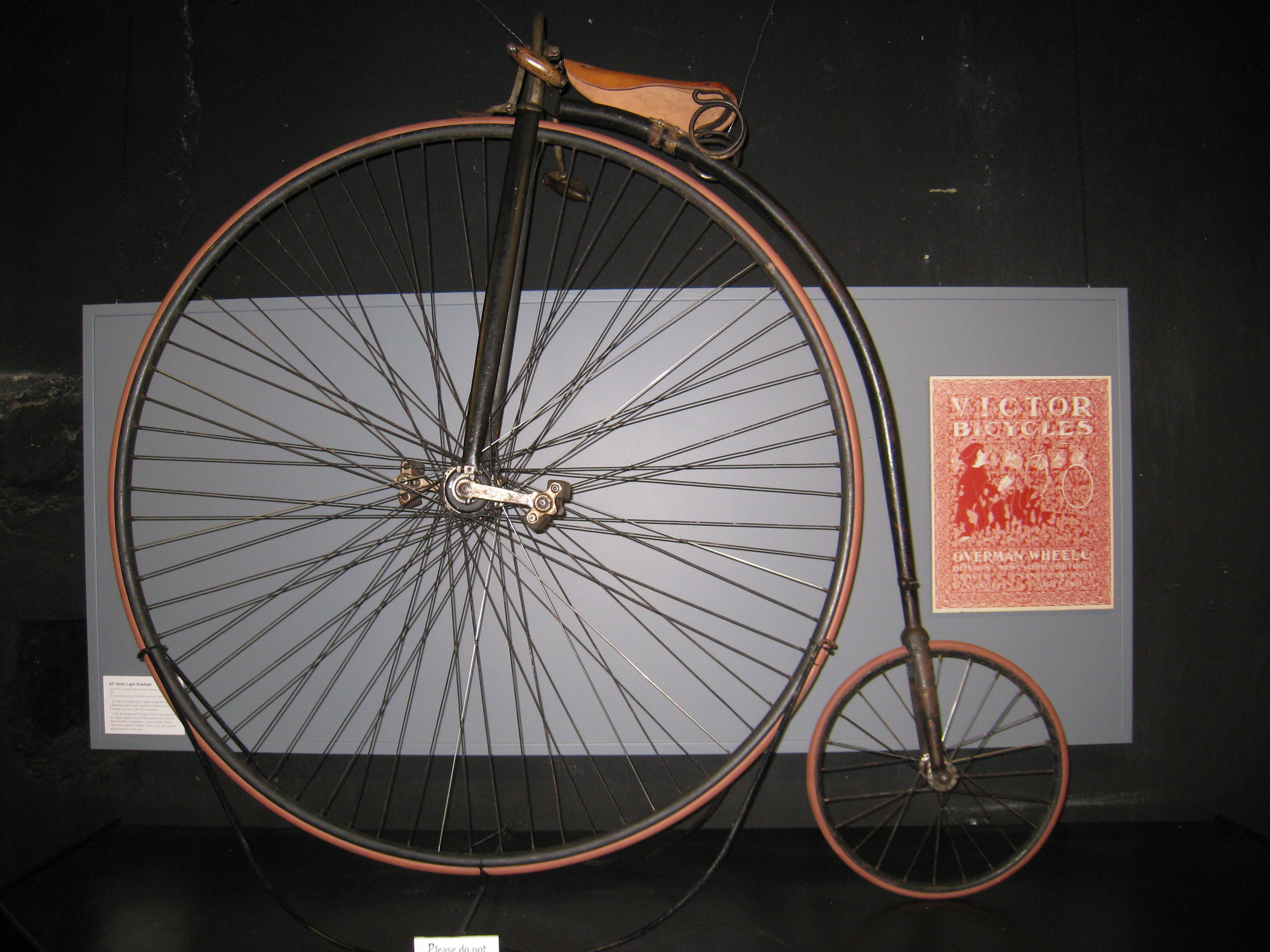
1889 Victor Light Roadster

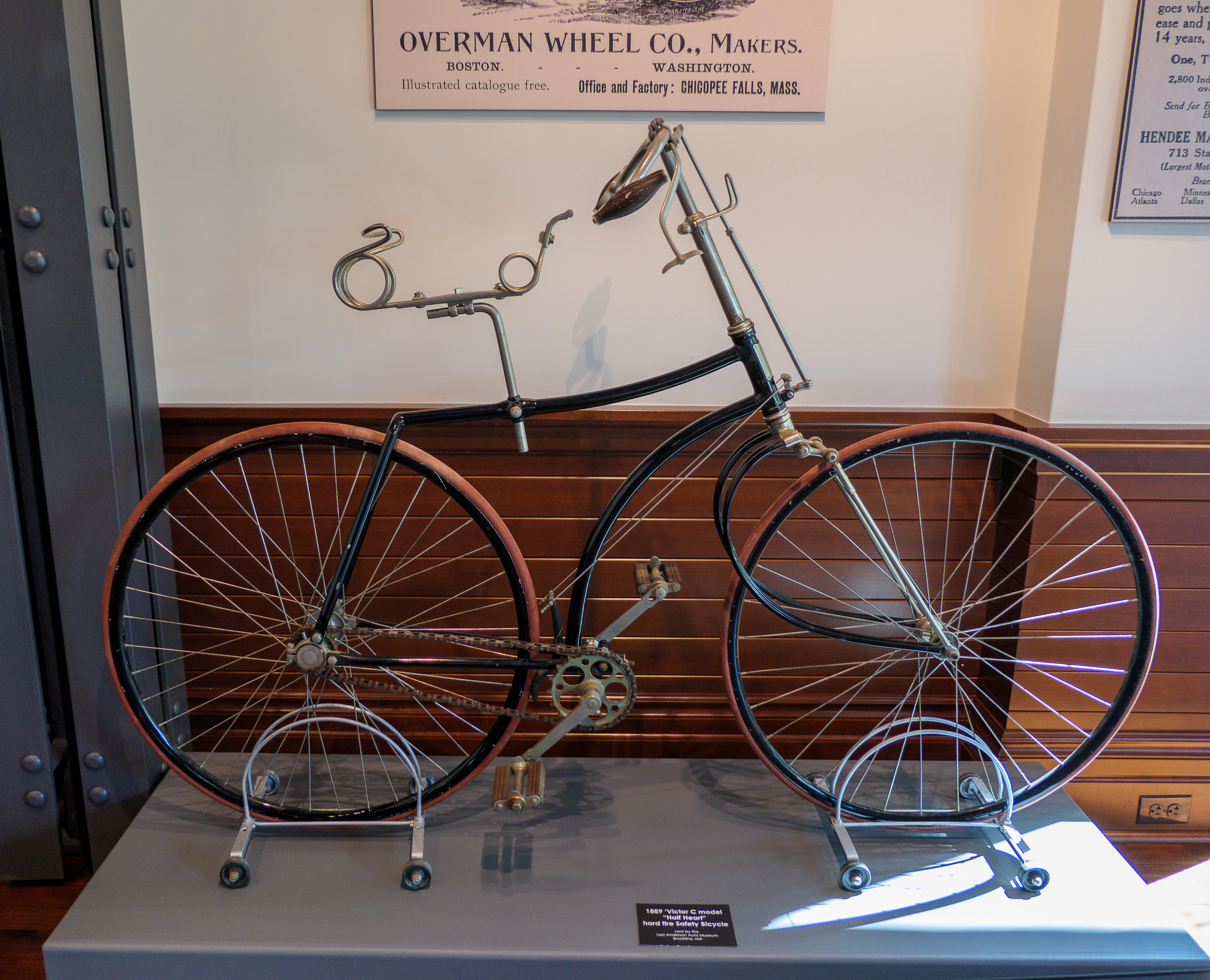
1889 Victor C Model "Half Heart" Safety Bicycle

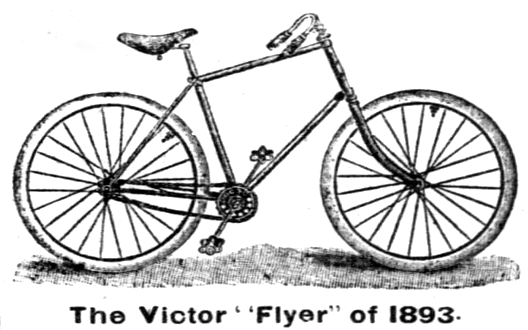
1893 Victor flyer

The flagship product of the Overman Company was the Victor Bicycle. The Victor Bicycle made extensive use of interchangeable parts, an innovation which allowed the owner to make minor repairs, without bringing the bicycle to a professional mechanic. The metal parts of the Victor bicycle were all steel; it was the first bicycle to use no cast metal parts. It was also one of the first bicycles to use a hollow pneumatic tire.

The first Victor bicycle, introduced in 1883, was a three-wheeled bicycle produced in Chicopee Falls. It was the first American-made three-wheeler. Three-wheelers were at the time considered a safer alternative to the high wheeler bicycle and started to gain in popularity. Overman also manufactured some high-wheelers in the 1880s.

By 1886-1887, new safety bicycles, introduced by John Kemp Starley, were becoming popular in England. While most American manufacturers stuck with the traditional high-wheel bicycles, Overman rushed a safety bicycle to production before the end of 1887. Despite its higher price, Overman's safety bicycle quickly became a sensation. Overman soon followed up with innovations such as a hollow core "cushion tire."

By 1893, Overman's Victor bicycle was considered an elegant, premium machine, the "highest grade bicycle of 1893". It was correspondingly priced at the high end of the market. The Overman factory made the complete bicycle, including tires, saddles, rims, etc.

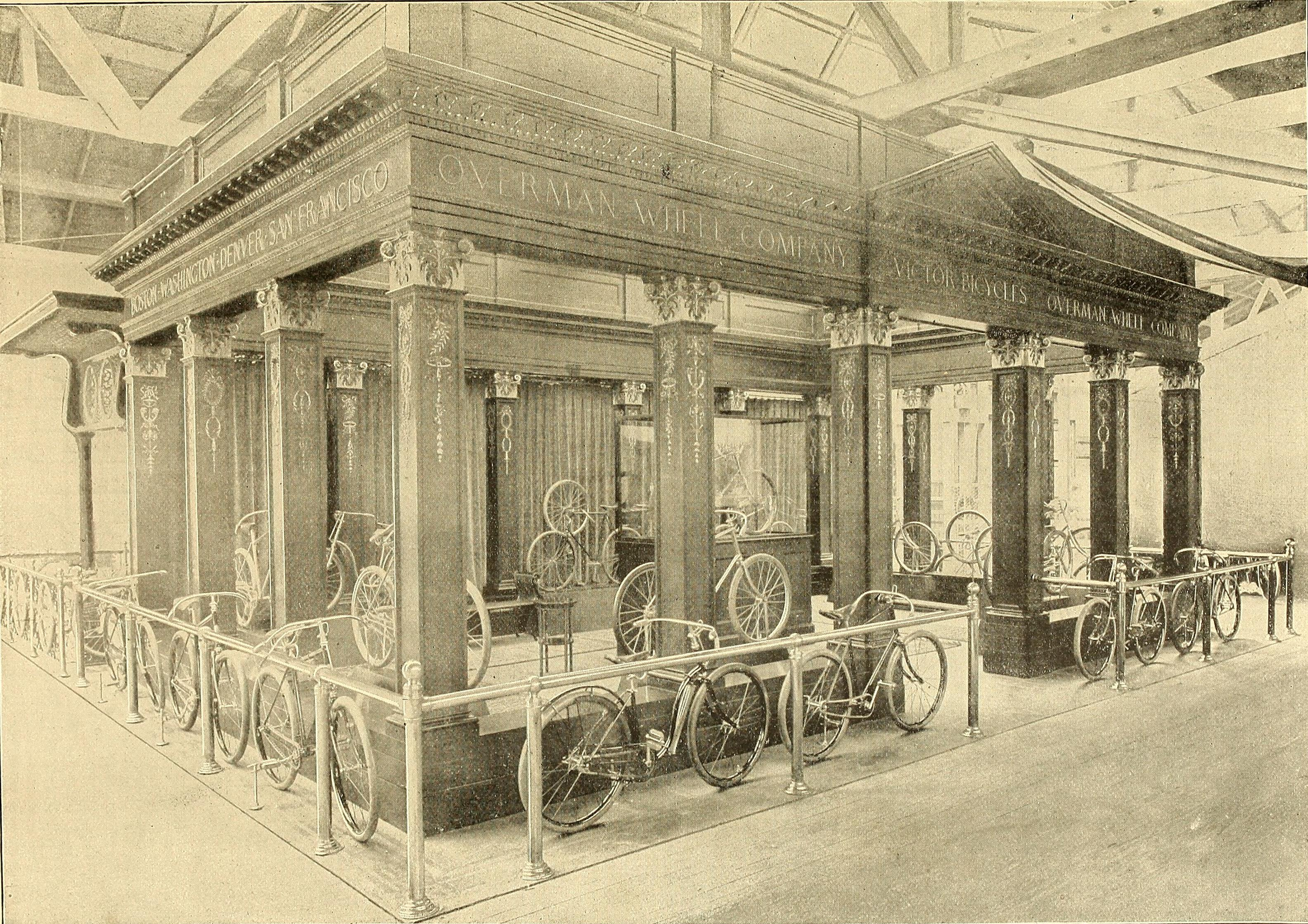
Overman Wheel Company exhibit at the Wheel and Cycling Trade Review (1893)

By 1895, eight models of the Victor were offered; five heights for men, two heights for women, and a racer which was available in five different heights. The 1895 Victoria Ladies' Bicycle sold for US$100.

The Overman Wheel Company was a pioneer in using testing equipment to measure things like bicycle power output and tire elasticity. This gave Victor bicycles a significant weight advantage over competitors of the time.

The Overman factory complex was made up of three buildings, and was located in Chicopee Falls, Massachusetts. It was considered the "most complete bicycle plant in the United States." The company had offices in Boston, New York, Detroit, Denver, San Francisco, Los Angeles, and Portland, Oregon.

Overman advertising posters

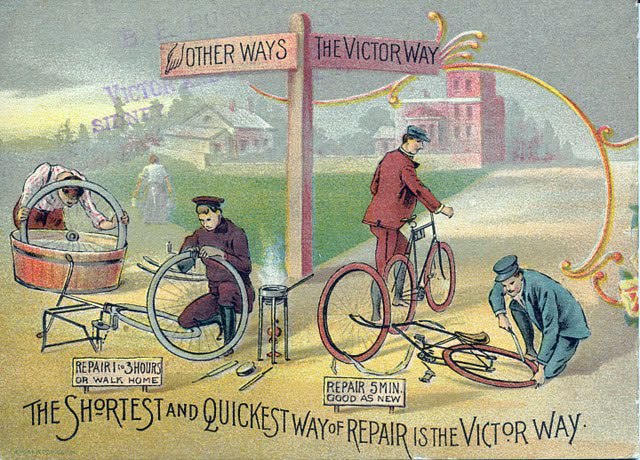
1894 advertisement

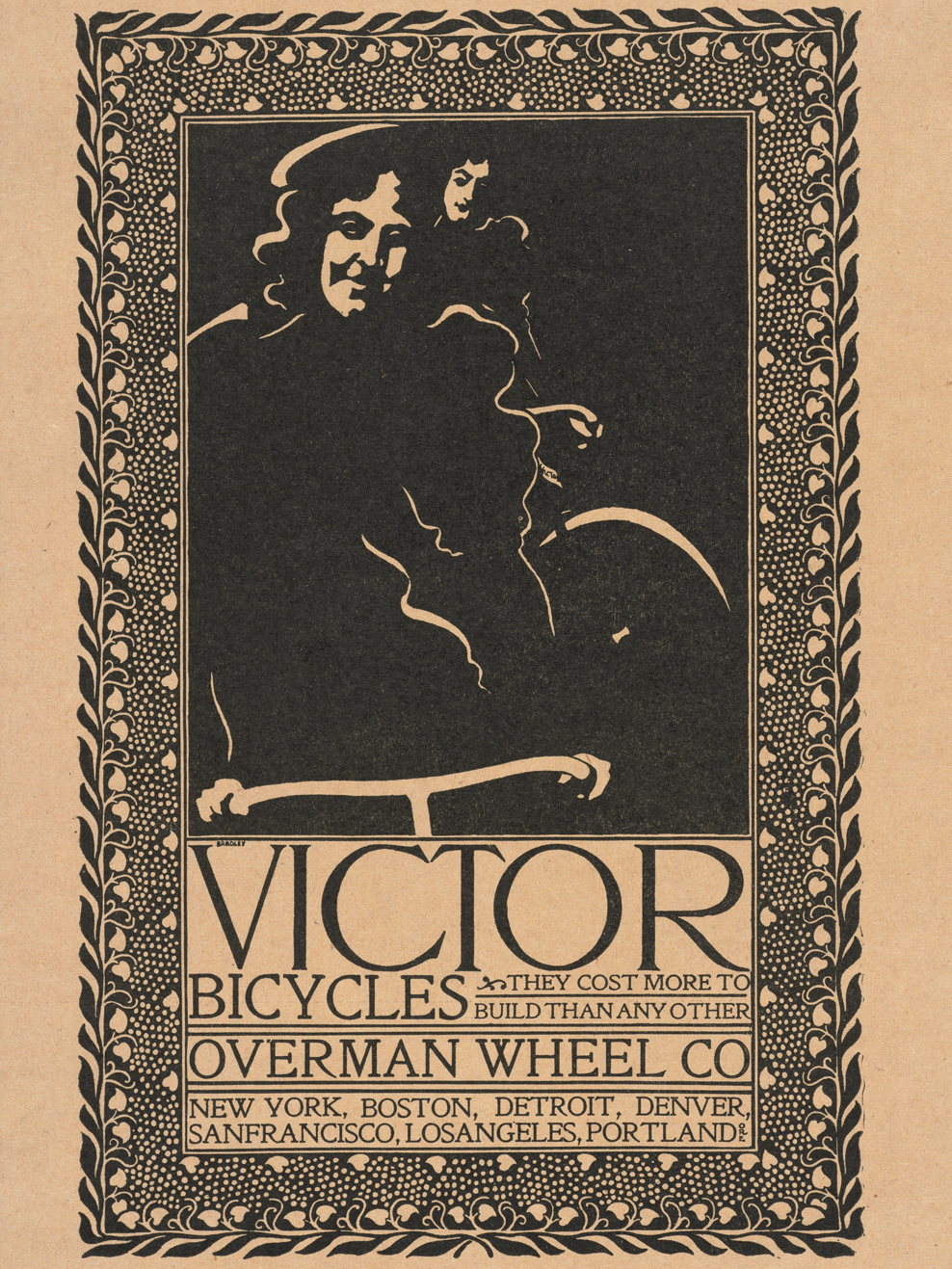
Poster by Will H. Bradley

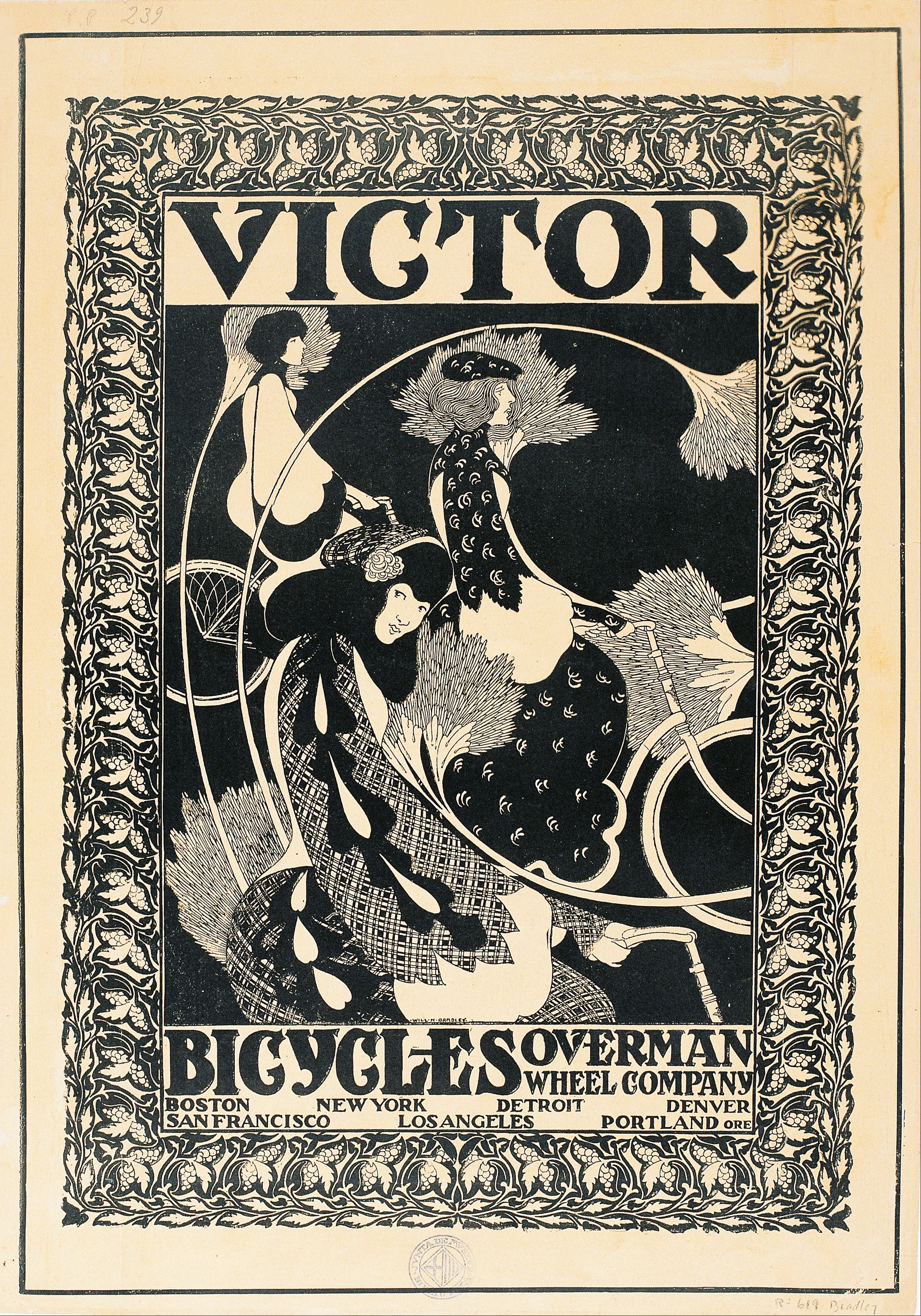
Poster by Will H. Bradley

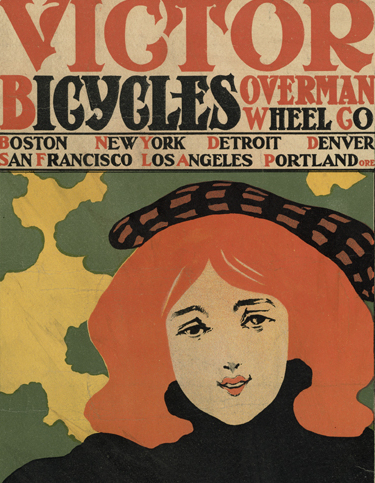
Poster by Will H. Bradley

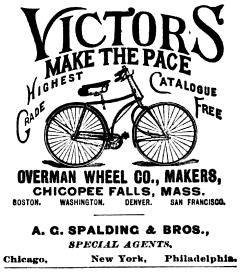
1891 newspaper advertisement

== Decline ==
Overman had contracted with the Spalding sports equipment company as their sole bicycle distributor. This worked well for a few years, but by about 1892 or 1893, the two companies had a serious falling out. The two companies first brought lawsuits against each other for thousands of dollars. Then they began competing head-to-head for the sporting goods market. The Spalding company started making their own line of bicycles in their own factory in Chicopee Falls, and the Overman company entered the sporting goods market with baseballs, bats, Indian clubs, footballs, and boxing gloves, "everything in the sporting goods line that the Spaldings made."

Spalding wasn't the only new competition faced by Overman. In 1896, there was simultaneously a bicycle craze and an economic slump, such that hundreds of manufacturers got into the bicycle business. People were buying bicycles, "whether they could afford them or not". This created a massive over-production, followed by a crash in bicycle prices. Despite this competition, Overman held firm to its $100 bicycle prices, which hurt sales.

By December 1897, the company, facing bankruptcy, was in debt for over a half-million dollars, their shops closed, and hundreds of employees were thrown out of work. Creditors extended a last-minute effort to revive the company on January 1, 1898. By May 1899, the company was desperately trying to regain market share by slashing bicycle prices down to $40.

A fire broke out at the Overman factory on November 23, 1899, creating considerable fire and water damage. Overman sold his bicycle business to the Stevens Arms & Tool Co. of Chicopee Falls, MA in 1900.

== Overman Automobile Company ==
As early as 1899, Overman was turning his attention to automobiles. In 1901 Overman reorganized as the Overman Automobile Company, which sold a vehicle called the Victor Steam Carriage. Sales were not very high, and Andrew L. Riker designed an 8-hp 2-cylinder gasoline car, and a 16-hp 4-cylinder car which he partnered with Overman Automobile Company to produce. Overman merged with the Locomobile Company of America in 1904 and the cars became Locomobile's fist gasoline automobiles..

== Albert H. Overman ==
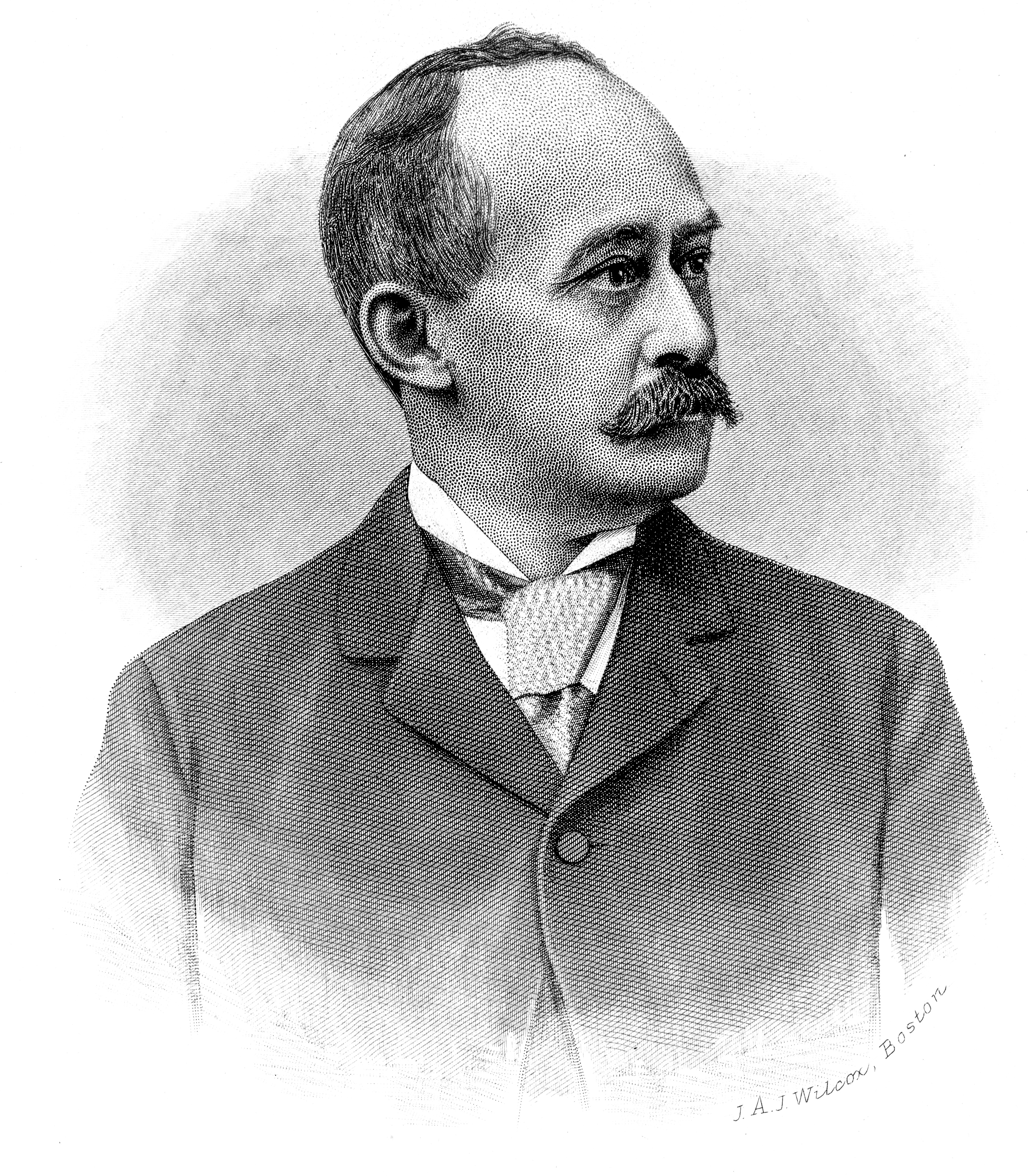
Albert H. Overman

Albert H. Overman was born in Fulton County, Illinois, on March 21, 1850. He started experimenting with wooden human-powered vehicles in his youth. He graduated from Illinois State Normal University. In 1881 he left Chicago and moved east. Albert married Millie E. Benton in 1873.

The Overmans lived in a mansion in Springfield, Massachusetts, three miles from his factories. They were known for entertaining lavishly.

Overman died July 30, 1930, in Westmoreland, New Hampshire, of a cerebral hemorrhage.
