= Locomobile Company of America =

Defunct American automobile manufacturer

- Industry: Automobile
- Founded: 1899
- Defunct: 1922
- Fate: Purchased, marque used until 1929
- Successor: Durant Motors
- Headquarters: Bridgeport, Connecticut, United States
- Key people: John Brisben Walker, Amzi L. Barber, Francis Edgar Stanley and Freelan O. Stanley
- Products: Vehicles

The Locomobile Company of America was a pioneering American automobile manufacturer founded in 1899, known for its dedication to precision before the assembly-line era. It was one of the earliest car manufacturers in the advent of the automobile age. For the first two years after its founding, the company was located in Watertown, Massachusetts. Production was transferred to Bridgeport, Connecticut, in 1900, where it remained until the company's demise in 1929. The company manufactured affordable, small steam cars until 1903, when production switched entirely to internal combustion-powered luxury automobiles. Locomobile was taken over in 1922 by Durant Motors and eventually went out of business in 1929. All cars produced by the original company were always sold under the brand name Locomobile.

== History ==
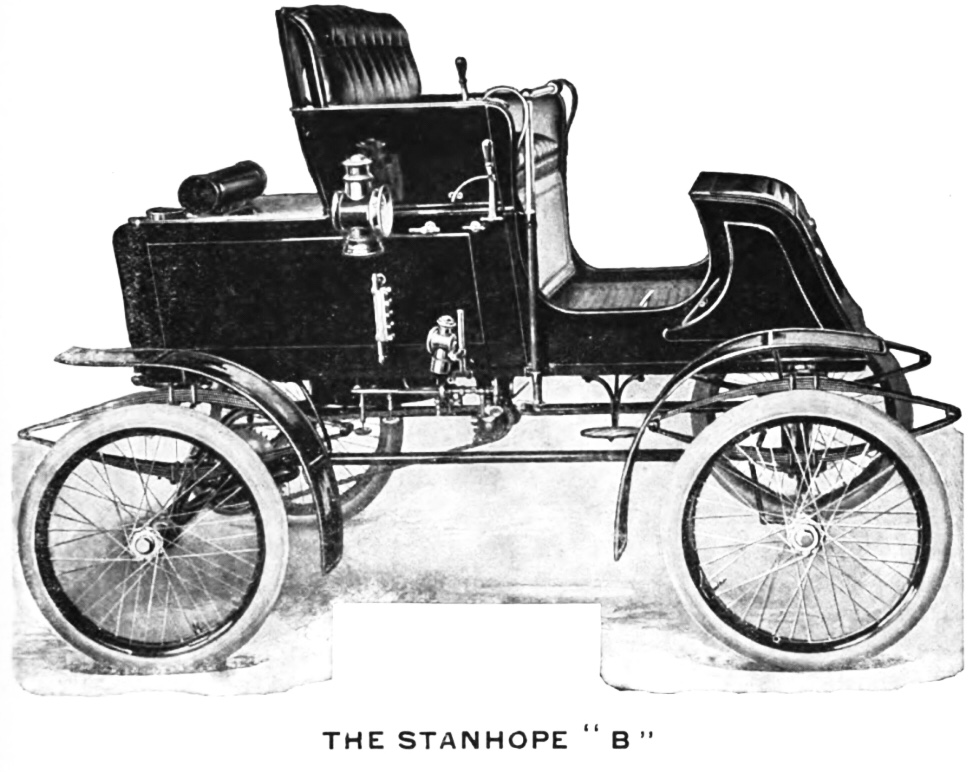
Locomobile Model B (1903)

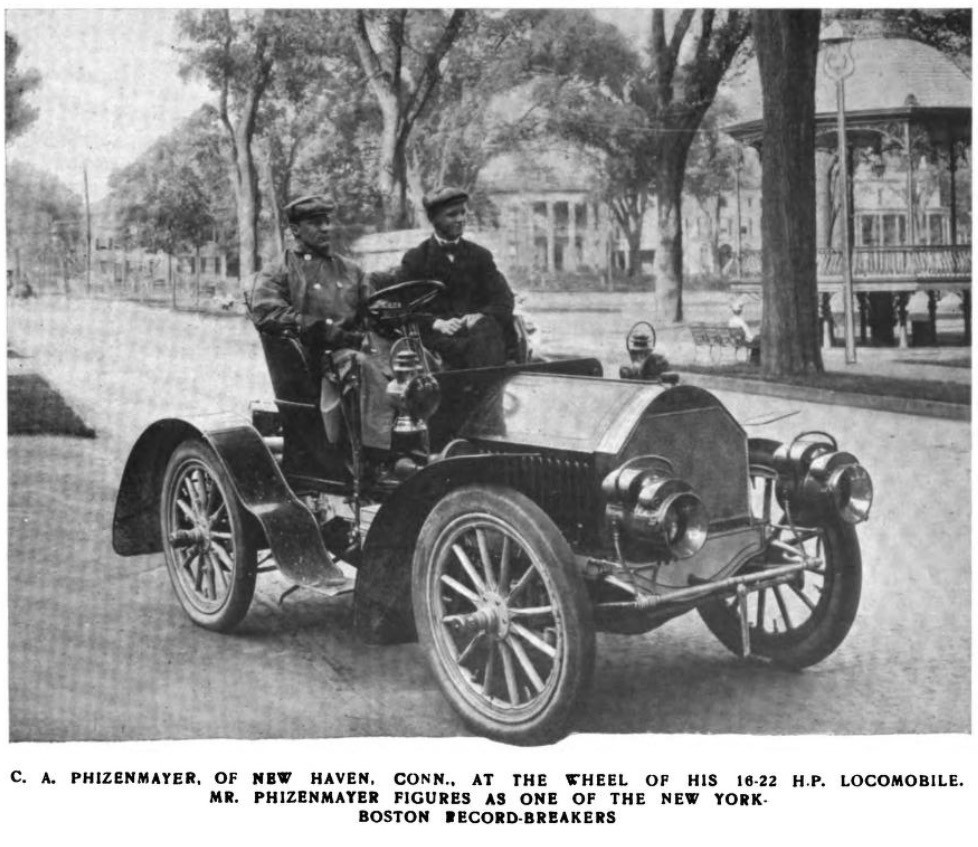
Locomobile Model D (1904) 16-22 hp

The Locomobile Company of America was founded in 1899, the name coined from "locomotive" and "automobile". John B. Walker, editor and publisher of Cosmopolitan, bought the plans for an early steam-powered vehicle produced by Francis and Freelan Stanley for a price they could not resist, US$250,000 (equivalent to $9,675,000 in 2025). At the time, one car had been built, and 199 more had been ordered. Walker promptly sold half of his interest to paving contractor Amzi L. Barber for the same price as he had purchased the entire company. Walker and Barber's partnership lasted two weeks. Walker went on to found Mobile Company of America in North Tarrytown, New York, while Barber moved house to Bridgeport, Connecticut, as Locomobile, where the Stanley twins were named general managers. The Stanley twins founded the Stanley Motor Carriage Company in 1902, becoming the sharpest rival to Locomobile.

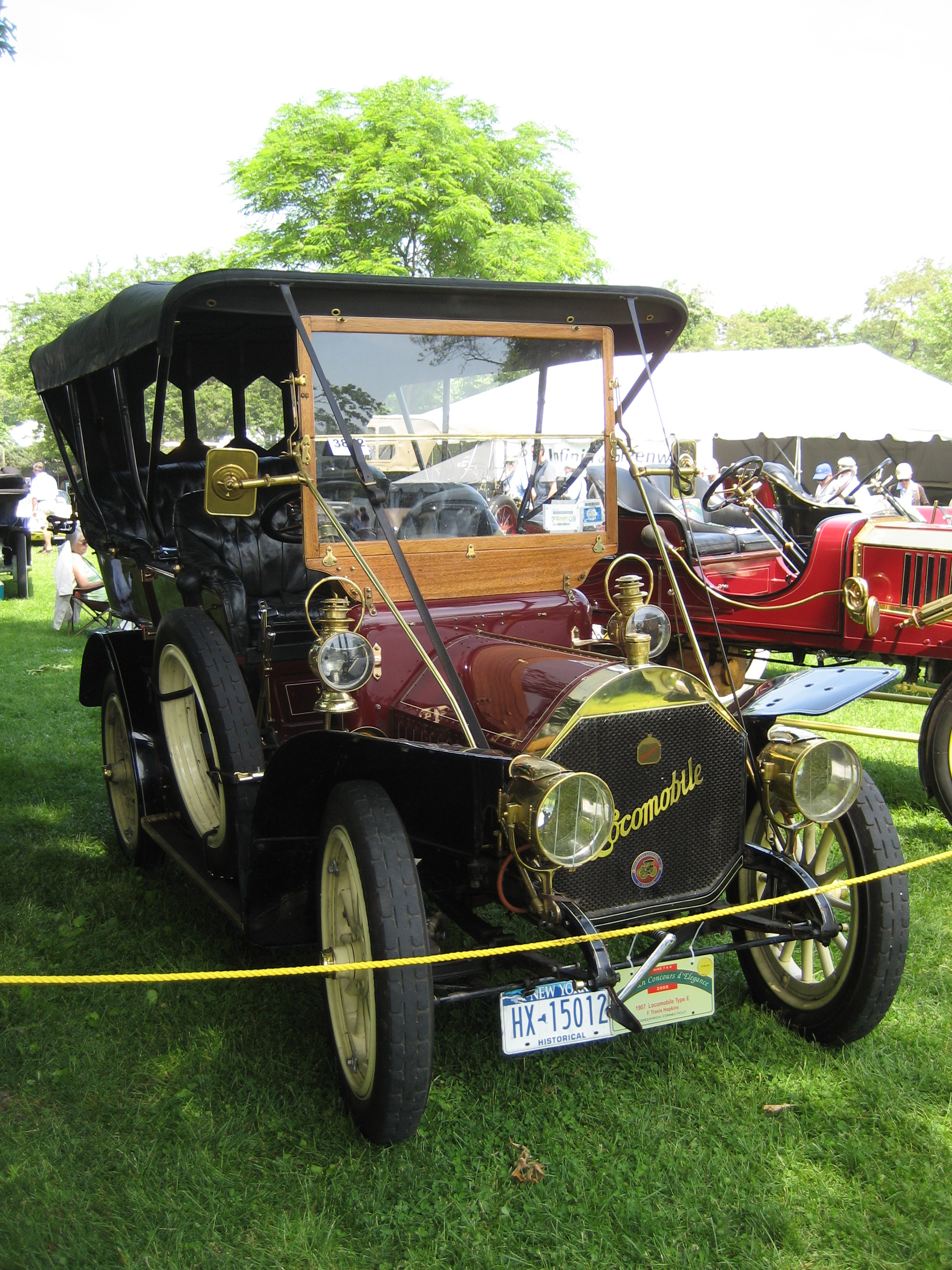
A 1907 Locomobile Type E Touring

Locomobile began by producing steam cars. The steam Locomobiles were unreliable, finicky to operate, prone to kerosene fires, had small water tanks (getting only 20 mi (32 km) per tank), and took time to raise steam; author Rudyard Kipling described one example as a "nickel-plated fraud". Initially, they were offered with a single body style only, an inexpensive runabout at $600 (equivalent to $23,220 in 2025). Nevertheless, they were a curiosity and middle-class Americans clamoured for the latest technology. Salesmen, doctors, and people needing quick mobility found them useful. More than 4,000 were built between 1899 and 1902.

In 1901, Locomobile offered seven body styles at prices between $600 (equivalent to $23,220 in 2025) and $1,400 (equivalent to $54,180 in 2025). Most Locomobiles had simple twin-cylinder engines with a 3 in × 4 in (76.2 mm × 101.6 mm) bore and stroke, displacing 56.6 cu in (927 cc), and a wire-wrapped 300-psi boiler, and burned the liquid fuel naphtha to create steam. Typical of the product was the 1904 Runabout, which seated two passengers and sold for $750 (equivalent to $26,875 in 2025). The two-cylinder steam engine was situated amidships of the wood-framed car. By now, the car had improved boilers and a new water pump, manufactured by the Overman Wheel Company in Chicopee Falls, Massachusetts. This company itself built the Victor Steamer.

During the Boer War, Locomobile did establish a new mark of sorts, becoming the first automobile to be used in war; it was a generator and searchlight tractor used to dismantle the Klein Nek minefield. It also served as a catering vehicle, with the useful ability (in British eyes, at least) of being able to brew a cup of tea by tapping the boiler.

This was, unfortunately, not a sure way to guarantee commercial success, even in Britain, and Locomobile started experimenting with gasoline internal combustion engines in 1902, starting with a four-cylinder, steel-chassis model designed by Andrew L. Riker. This encouraged the firm to drop steam vehicles the following year, selling the Stanley brothers back their rights for $20,000. In 1903, Barber relinquished his position to his son-in-law Samuel Todd Davis, Jr., who became President of the Locomobile Company.

== Switch to internal combustion engines ==
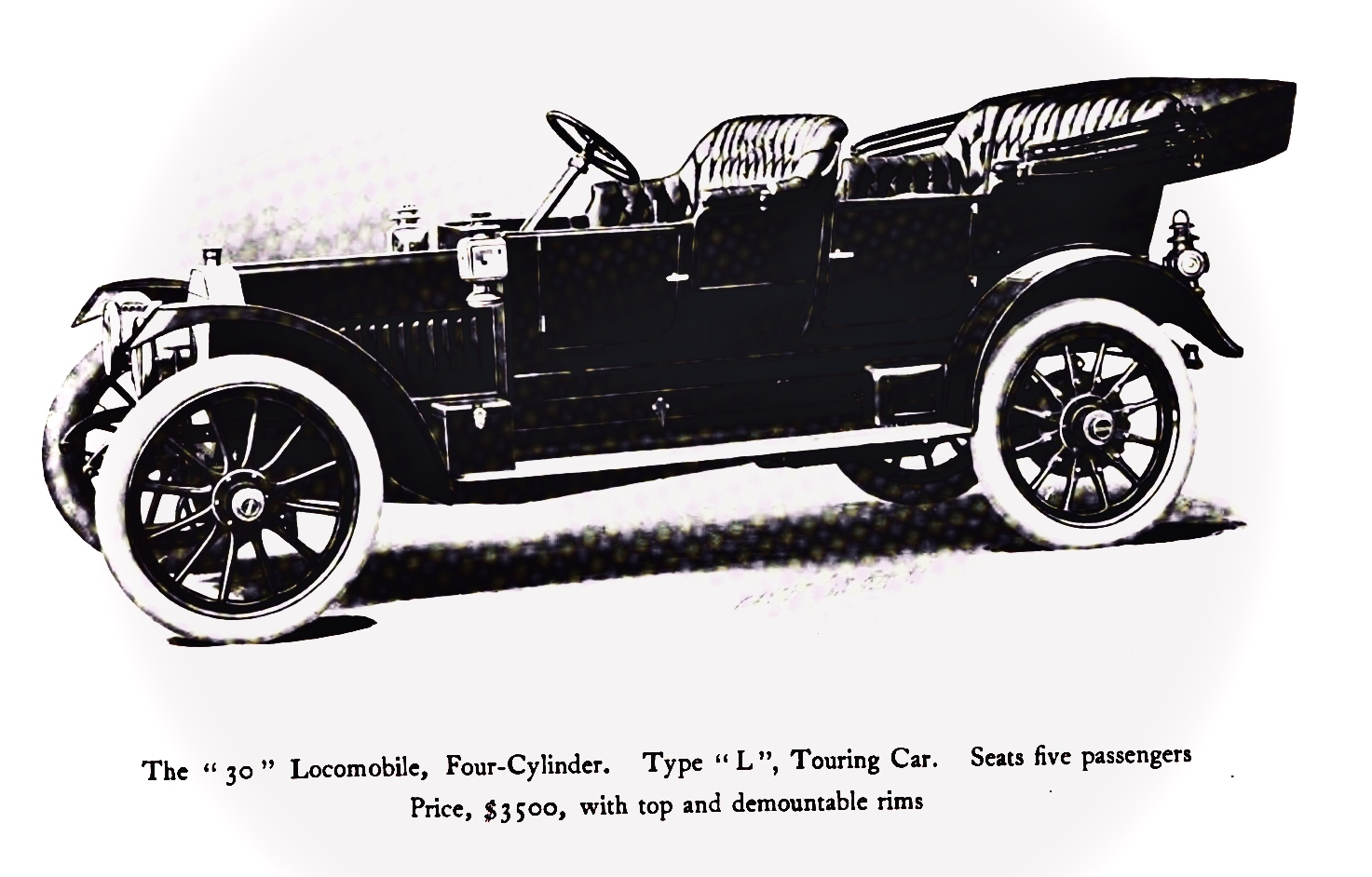
Locomobile 30(L) (1909)

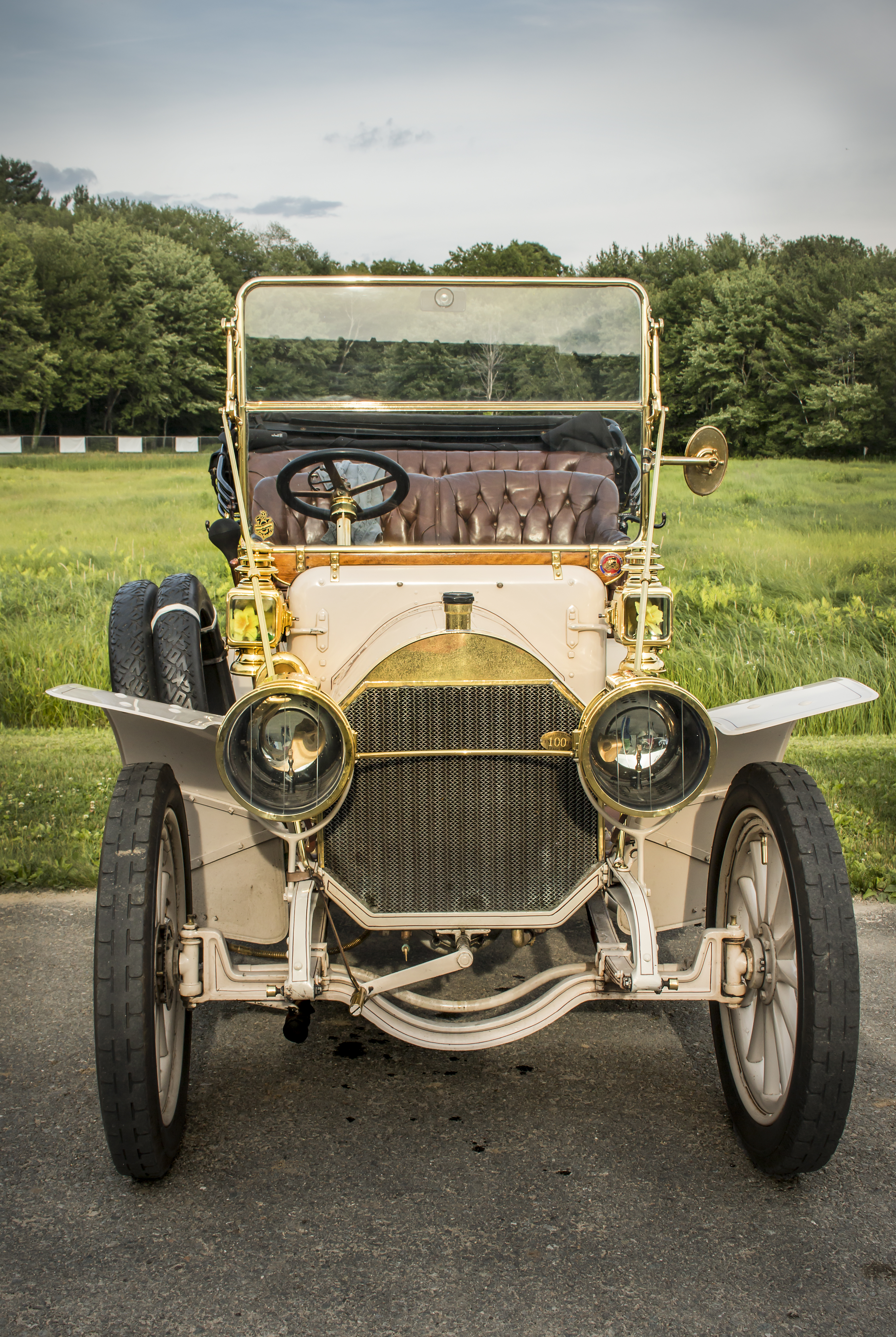
Locomobile E (1908)

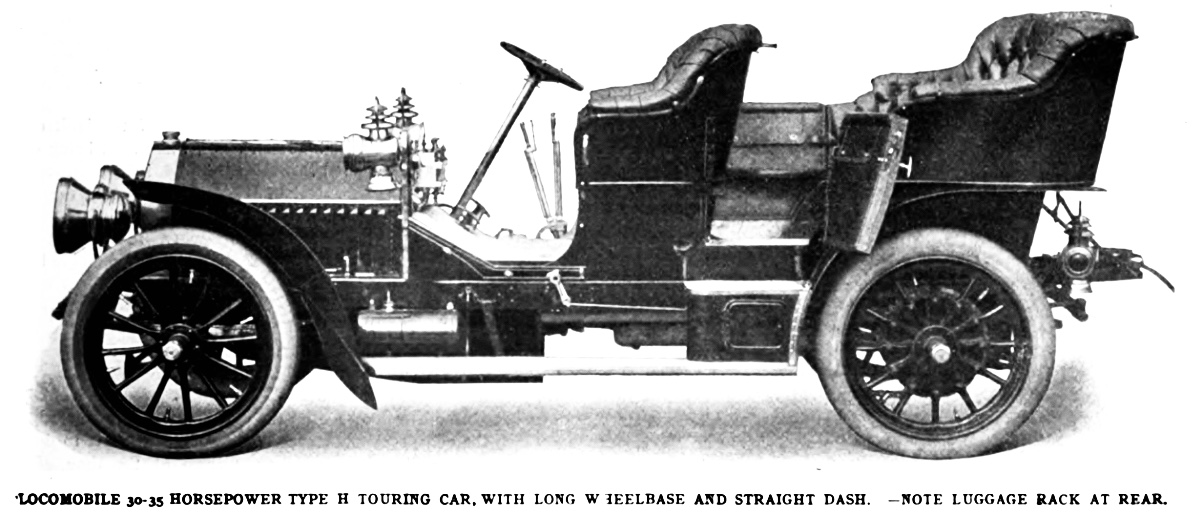
Locomobile Type H (1905-1907)

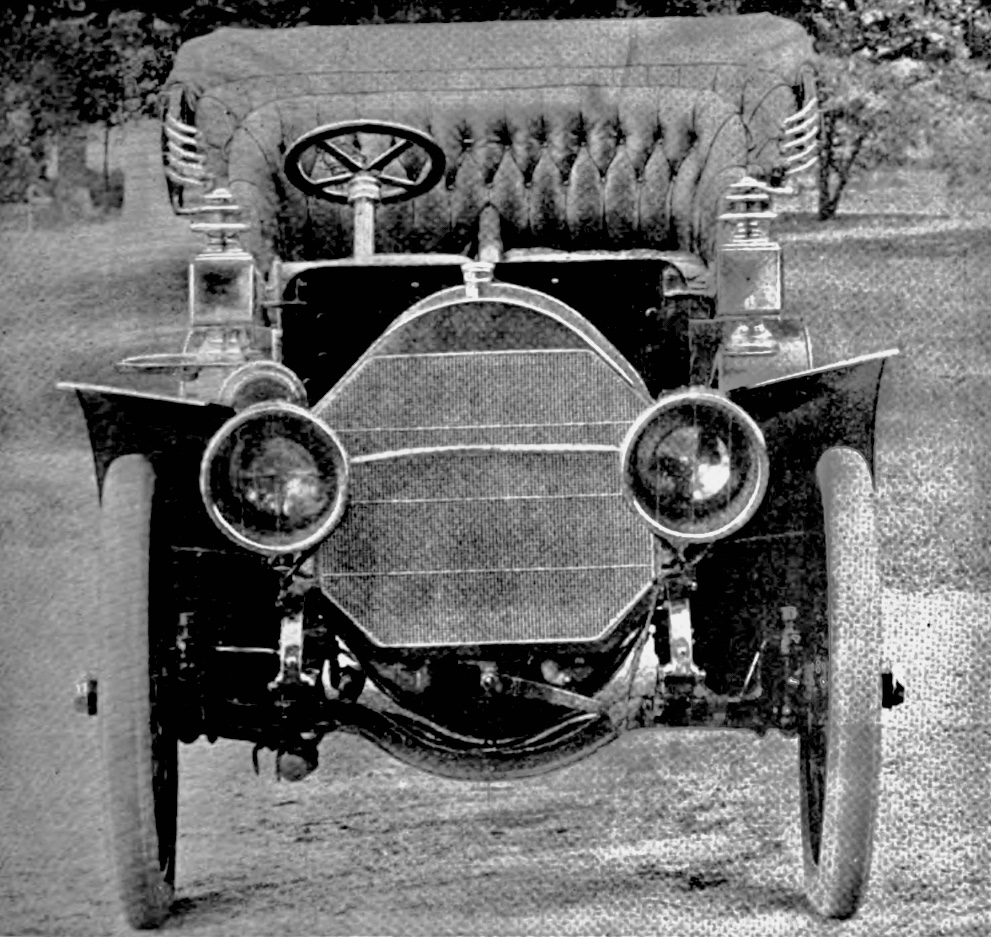
Locomobile Type I (1908)

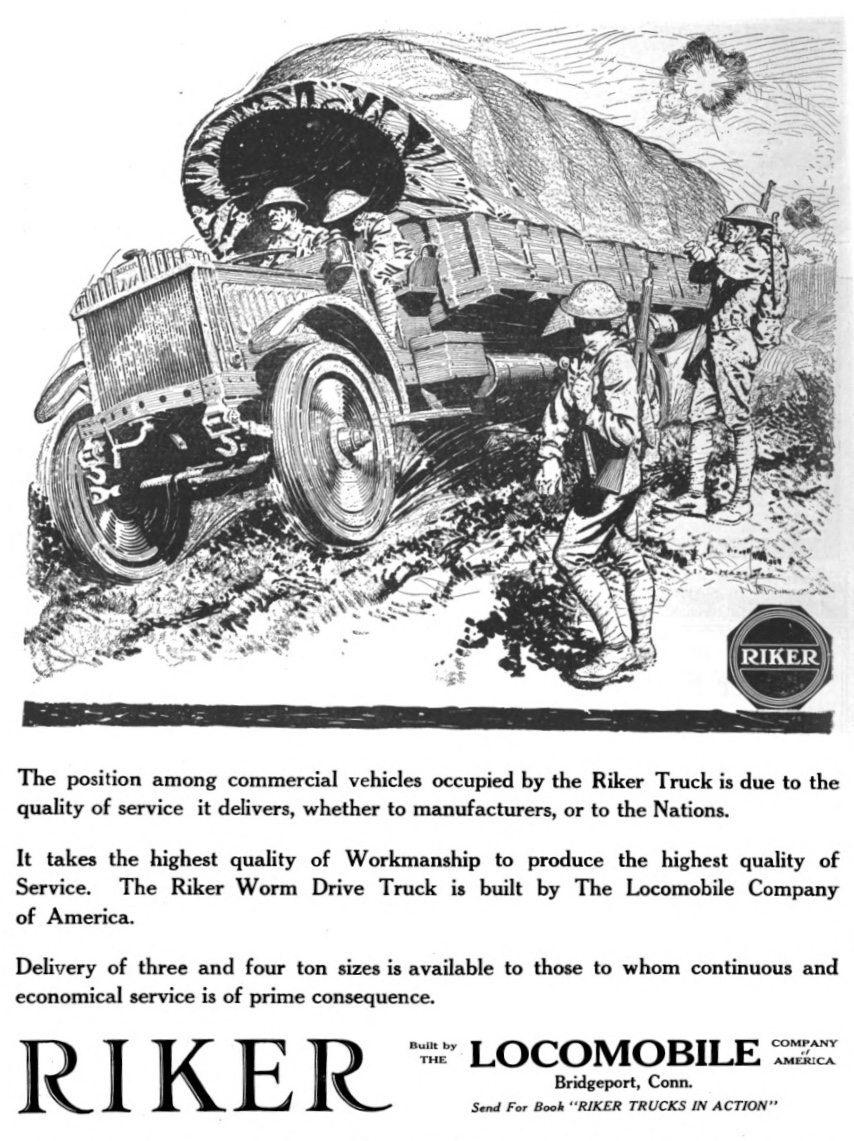
Riker Trucks (1918) 3t and 4t

The 1904 internal combustion Locomobile Touring car had a tonneau and space for five passengers, and sold for $4500, quite a change from the low-priced steam buggies. The front-mounted, vertical, water-cooled straight-four engine produced 16 hp (12 kW). A three-speed sliding transmission was used, as on the Système Panhard cars with which it competed. The angle steel-framed car weighed 2,200 lb (998 kg). The 1908 Locomobile 40 Runabout was a 60 hp (45 kW) two-seater and sold for $4,750 (equivalent to $170,208 in 2025). On the strength of recent competition successes, Locomobile soon became known for well-built and speedy luxury cars.

== In competition ==
Like other early marques, Locomobile entered motor racing, contesting the 1905 Gordon Bennett Cup with a 17.7-litre (1,080 in^{3}) racer; after suffering a transmission gear failure, and with no spare available, driver Joe Tracy only managed two circuits of Auvergne before the transmission packed up entirely. Tracy did better for the company at the Vanderbilt Cup, placing third. A 90 hp (67 kW), 16.2-litre (990 cu in) F-head was damaged by tire trouble, so Tracy failed again in the 1906 Vanderbilt, but in 1908, George Robertson (wearing number 16) took the win in this car, ahead of fellow Locomobile pilot Joe Florida in third, becoming the first United States-built car to win in international competition. This was the high-water mark for Locomobile racing, and they soon faded from the scene, though Orin Davis did score a win in the Los Angeles–Phoenix rally in 1913. A Locomobile was raced by Eva Mudge, believed to be the first female driving licence holder and first female racing driver. In 1925, the Locomobile team entered a front-wheel-drive Miller car called the "Junior Eight Special" after their recently introduced smaller car at the Indianapolis 500, but there was nothing Locomobile about it aside from the name.

== Model 48 and the Durant years ==
The most important for the marque became the impressive Model 48. Introduced in 1911 as the "type M," it had a very conservative, perhaps dated, concept. It had a conventional but huge chassis with a wheelbase of 143 inches (3,632 mm). Its engine was a straight six with side valves; cylinders were still cast in pairs and it featured a nonremovable cylinder head. Displacement was 429.4 cu in (7.0 L), from a 4 1/2 in × 4 1/2 in (114 mm × 114 mm) bore and stroke, giving it a 48.6-hp tax rating by the North American Chamber of Commerce. While called the "M" internally, this car is usually referred to by its tax hp rating. The brake horsepower rating was somewhere north of 90 for the original model, higher in the later versions. Quality of materials and workmanship were impeccable and among the best in the world. Such was also its pricing: A typical open-body cost about $10,000 when the average Model T Ford Phaeton cost about $300. Locomobile also offered custom designs for the lamps and metal work, carried out by Tiffany Studios. Until 1915, left- or right-hand drive could be specified; afterwards, left-hand drive became standard. Right-hand drive cars were meant for export and sat on a chassis four inches shorter. Around 1919, the engine was updated with a longer 5 1/2 in (140 mm) stroke, for 525 cu in (8.6 L) displacement while retaining the same tax hp rating.

A smaller "38 hp" model, very similar to the Model 48, was added in 1913. The model 38 has a 425 cu in (7.0 L), 62 bhp (46 kW) version of the T-head six and sits on a somewhat shorter 140 inches (3,556 mm) wheelbase. By 1914, Locomobile had stopped selling all four-cylinder models to concentrate exclusively on sixes.

In July 1922, Locomobile was acquired by Durant Motors, which not only continued using the Locomobile brand name for their top-of-the-line autos until 1929, but also still produced the Model 48 until its demise in 1929. Until the mid-1920s, this car was Locomobile's only offering. In 1925, the marque brought out their first new model, the 8-66 Junior Eight, with a more contemporary straight-eight engine, and more importantly, a lower price of $1,785.

Introduction of the even smaller Junior Six was in 1926, but this car remained available only for one model year. The larger Model 90 that appeared in the same year was produced until 1929.

With the 8-70 of 1927, Locomobile added one more eight-cylinder car. Using an off the shelf Lycoming engine, this was not accepted as a true Locomobile in the marketplace and it served to damage the company's reputation. In the following year, the Junior Eight 8-66 was phased out.

For 1929, a new 8-86 and 8-88 came out, but it was too late to save the company. Locomobile production ended in 1929.

== Locomobile model specifications ==
- Locomobile Type D
- Locomobile Type E
- Locomobile Type F
- Locomobile Type H
- Locomobile Type Cup Racer
- Locomobile Type I
- Locomobile Type 30
- Locomobile Type 40
- Locomobile Type 30 L
- Locomobile Model 48 Type M
- Locomobile Type 32 L
- Locomobile Model 48 Sportif

== Riker trucks ==
From 1916 to 1921, Locomobile produced trucks under the name Riker, the Riker Model B. During the First World War, 1,150 Riker trucks were used in Europe.

== Overview of production figures ==
Year	Production	Vehicle types this year
1899	337	Steam Runabout
1900	767	Steam Runabout
1901	1.561	Steam Runabout, Steam Buggy, Steam Locosurrey
1902	2.750	Steam Runabout, Steam Buggy, Steam Locosurrey, Steam Locotrap, Steam Locodilivery, A, B
1903	1.897	Steam Runabout, Steam Locosurrey, A, B, C, D, Dos-a-Dos
1904	927	Steam Runabout, Steam Locosurrey, A, B, C, D, Dos-a-Dos
1905	688	D, E, H, F
1906	723	E, H, Special
1907	627	E, H, Special
1908	1.000	E, I
1909	1.000	30(L), 40(I)
1910	1.000	30(L), 40(I), 48(M)
1911	1.000	30(L), 48(M)
1912	1.000	30(L), 48(M)
1913	1.000	30(L), 48(M), 38(R)
1914	1.000	48(M), 38(R)
1915	1.000	48(M), 38(R)
1916	1.000	48(M), 38(R)
1917	1.000	48(M), 38(R)
1918	627	48(M), 38(R)
1919	429	48(M)
1920	1.000	48(M)
1921	721	48(M)
1922	221	48(M)
1923	116	48(M)
1924	230	48(M)
1925	828	48(M), Junior 8
1926	2.586	48(M), Junior 8, 90
1927	2.037	48(M), Junior 8, 90, 8-80
1928	1.112	48(M), 90, 8-80
1929	327	48(M), 90, 88
Sum	30.511	

== Locomobiles in fiction ==
A Locomobile is the setting for one of the final scenes of F. Scott Fitzgerald's first novel, This Side of Paradise, in which the protagonist, Amory Blaine, argues for socialism to the father of a college friend, who staunchly defends the capitalist ideal.

In the spring and summer of 1946, a seven-passenger 1911 Locomobile touring car was driven from Boston to Los Angeles and back as a promotional tour for the Columbia Pictures film Gallant Journey. While not appearing in the movie, the Locomobile attracted much attention for the picture on the tour.

In Thomas Savage's 1967 novel The Power of the Dog, set in the 1920s, the Locomobile is esteemed by protagonist Peter Gordon as a peer to the Pierce-Arrow: "... Those were the vehicles of the high and mighty, and he knew that only the Locomobile (fancied by old General Pershing, among others) rivaled the Pierce."

Clive Cussler's 2007 novel, The Chase, as well as his 2010 novel The Spy, featured a 1906 Locomobile.

In Dashiell Hammett's 1925 mystery story "Scorched Face", the rich girls for whom the Continental Op is looking, were driving a Locomobile "with a special cabriolet body" when they disappeared.

Papa LaBas from Ishmael Reed's 1972 novel Mumbo Jumbo drives a Locomobile.

The Locomobile is central to the 2015 historical novel by Lisa Begin-Kruysman titled Around the World in 1909: Harriet White Fisher and Her Locomobile. The novel is based on Harriet White Fisher's circumnavigation of the globe; the Locomobile is driven, hauled, pushed, and floated in places where no man, let alone woman, had yet explored, certainly not on wheels.

== See also ==
- List of defunct United States automobile manufacturers
