= Locomobile Model 48 =

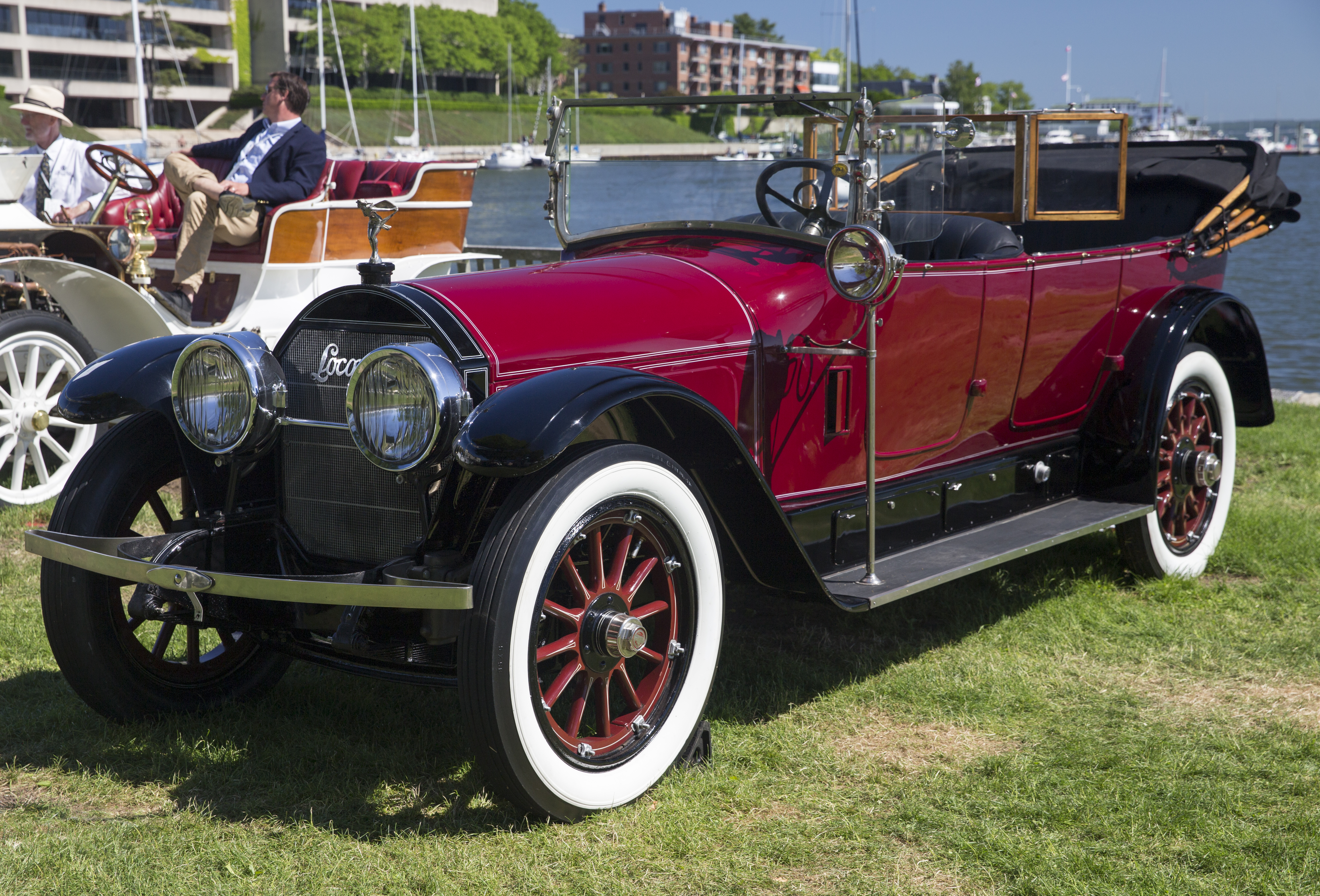
- 1923 Model 48 Touring Car

Overview
- Manufacturer: Locomobile Company of America
- Production: 1911–1929

Body and chassis
- Class: Luxury car
- Body style: Touring car, roadster, limousine & landaulet
- Layout: Front-engine, rear-wheel-drive

Powertrain
- Engine: 6-cylinder inline petrol 48 3/5 hp (36.2 kW) (Note: S.A.E. or N.A.C.C. horsepower rating.)
- Transmission: 4F1R

Dimensions
- Wheelbase: 11 ft 3 in (3.43 m)
- Length: 16 ft 3 in (4.95 m)
- Width: 5 ft 7 1/2 in (1.71 m)
- Height: 7 ft 5 1/2 in (2.27 m)

The Locomobile Model 48 was a luxury car model produced by the Locomobile Company of America. Introduced in 1911, the Model 48 would remain in production until Locomobile ceased trading in 1929.

The Model 48 was used by the American Expeditionary Forces during the First World War as a luxury staff car, reserved for the most senior American officers.

== Design ==
The Model 48 was a front-engine, rear-wheel-drive luxury car, initially it was produced with touring car, roadster, limousine and landaulet bodies. The touring car version of 1911 had a wheelbase of 11 ft 3 in (3.43 m), was 16 ft 3 in (4.95 m) in total length, 5 ft 7 1/2 in (1.71 m) wide and 7 ft 5 1/2 in (2.27 m) in height with the roof raised. In 1913 the wheelbase was increased to 13 ft 4 in (4.06 m), in 1914 a longer 13 ft 8 in (4.17 m) was made available, and in 1915 the shorter wheelbase version was discontinued.

Upon introduction in 1911, the Model 48 was powered by a 429.4 cu in (7,037 cc) Locomobile straight-six petrol engine. The engine had a bore and stroke of 4 1/2 in × 4 1/2 in (114 mm × 114 mm) and dual-magnetos, it had a S.A.E. or N.A.C.C. horsepower rating of 48 3/5 hp (36.2 kW). In 1913 the displacement was increased to 524.8 cu in (8,600 cc) by increasing the stroke to 5 1/2 in (140 mm), this increased the power output to 95 hp (71 kW) at 2,200 rpm. By 1924 the engine's power output had been further increased to 103 hp (77 kW).

The Model 48 was driven through a 4-forward, 1-reverse manual transmission and was fitted with a multiple disc clutch. It had an I-beam front axle, a fully floating live rear axle, and semi-elliptical leaf spring suspension. Initially only the rear wheels were braked, but in 1924 brakes were fitted to all four wheels. It was equipped with a 23 US gal (87 L; 19 imp gal) fuel tank, which was later increased in size to 36 US gal (140 L; 30 imp gal).

== History ==
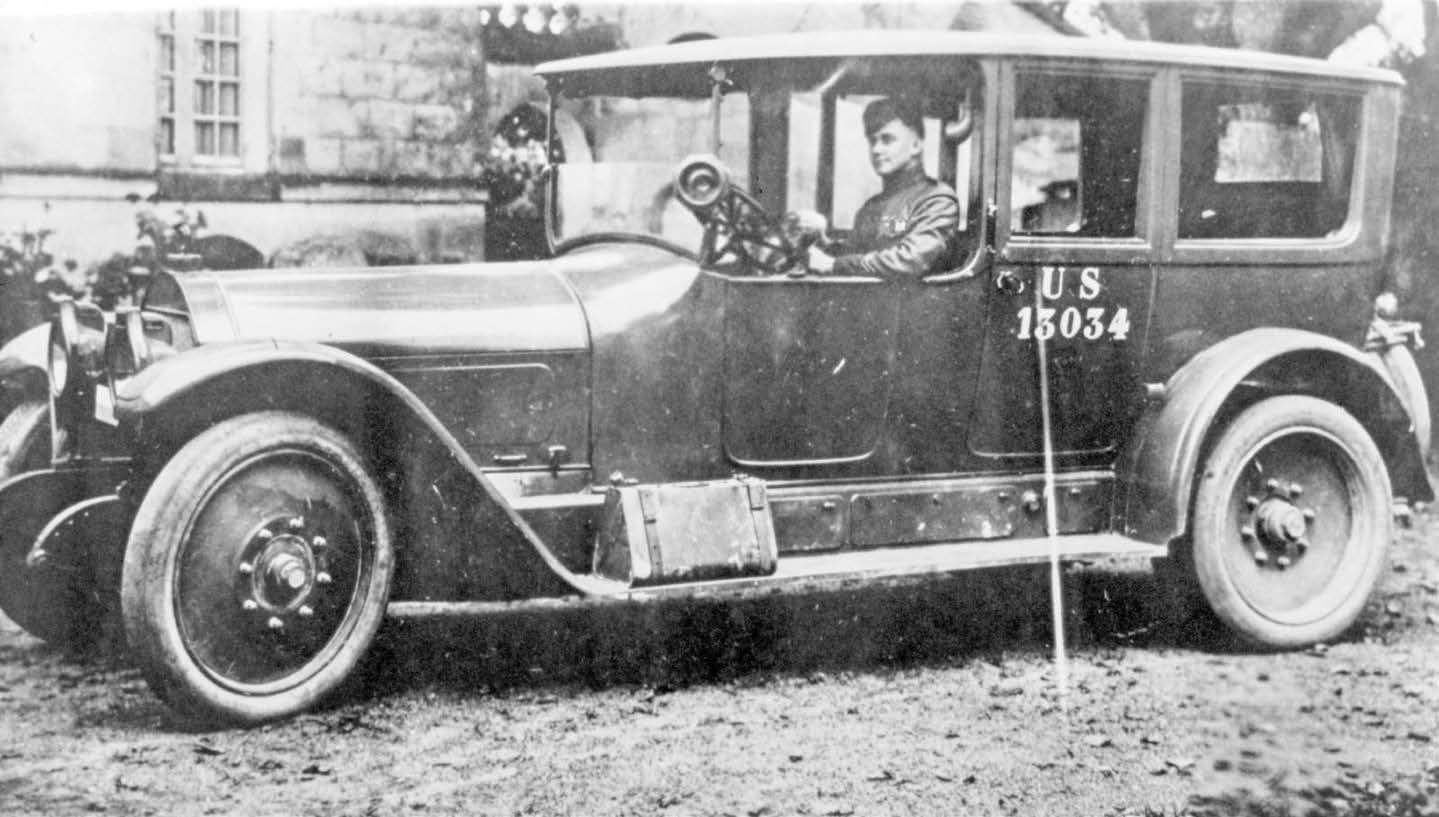
Locomobile Model 48 staff car with steel disc wheels

One of two Model 48s specially built for General Pershing, with a narrower chassis and V-shaped windscreens to reduce wind resistance

In 1911, Locomobile introduced a new luxury car model, the Model 48, with a number of bodily types including 7 seat tourers, 2 seat roadsters, and 7 seat limousines and landaulets. Upon its introduction, the listed factory prices ranged from US$4,800 for a tourer to US$6,150 for a landaulet. In 1917, Locomobile introduced the Sportif four seat sporting tourer version of the Model 48.

In 1922, the Locomobile company was purchased by William C. Durant, and incorporated into his Durant Motors group. The Model 48 was retained in production by Durant under the Locomobile marque, and in 1926 the Model 48 was complemented with the introduction of the Model 90, a slightly smaller luxury model available at slightly reduced prices.

Production of the Model 48 continued through the 1920s with progressive improvements, despite the model being quite antiquated by that time. In the mid-1920s, Locomobile was still producing between 400–500 Model 48s per year. Production of the Model 48 finally ceased in 1929 when Locomobile went out of business. In 1929 the factory prices for Model 48s ranged between US$9,600 and US$12,500 depending on the body type, although production had reduced to a trickle.

=== Military service ===
Upon the US entry to the First World War in 1917, Model 48s were ordered by the US Army as luxury staff cars for the most senior officers. During the War, the Cadillac Type 57 was standardised as the American Expeditionary Forces luxury staff car, but the Model 48 was considered a far more luxury model and were typically reserved for use by the most senior officers. The Model 48 limousine was one of the most expensive staff cars in military service with the Allies, a fact that led the French Parliament to accuse the American Expeditionary Forces of extravagance. During the War, General Pershing ordered 19 Model 48s, each costing between US$7,000 and US$9,000. As a result of a directive from General Pershing, most Model 48s were in military service had their standard wooden spoked wheels replaced by steel disc wheels, twinned at the rear, which was reported to give an uncomfortable ride.

In 1918 Locomobile produced a special version of the Model 48 for the US Military, the 'Special Overseas Limousine', which retained the disc wheels, but was built with a slightly narrower body and a V-shaped windscreens, both designed to reduce wind resistance. Two unique Model 48s were produced specially for use by General Pershing in Europe, with the narrow body and a V-shaped windscreens, but with wire spoked wheels. Both of these were repatriated to the United States at the end of the War.
