= Eva Mudge =

American actress (1880–1964)

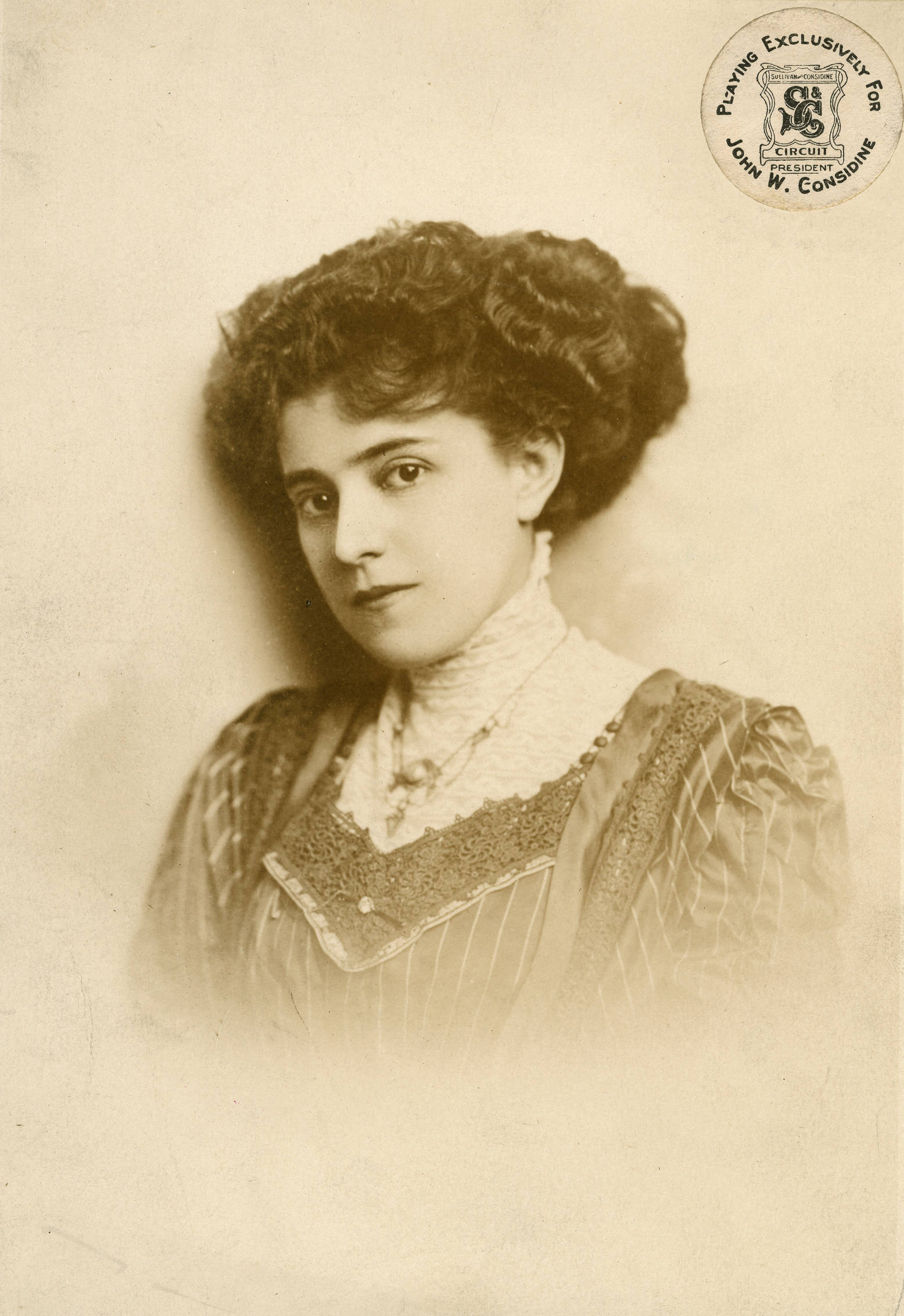
- Mudge in 1911
- Born: Geneva Delphine Mudge; December 3, 1880; Port Huron, Michigan, U.S.
- Died: September 14, 1964 (aged 83); New York City, U.S.
- Other name: Eva Mudge Nelson
- Occupations: Singer, actress, vaudeville performer
- Years active: 1888–1914, 1923, 1942–1951
- Spouse(s): Sanford Leroy Nelson (m. 1904 or 1905; div. 1914; Hans H. W. Jorgensen (m. 1914; div. 1928); George C. Brundage m. 1928 or 1929; div. 1932

Eva Mudge (December 3, 1880 – 1964) was a singer and actress, both in vaudeville and on the legitimate stage, who achieved great success in the late 19th and early 20th centuries, but is best remembered for being the first recorded female automobile driver.

== Early life and career ==
Born in Port Huron, Michigan to Delphine Ozella (Parker) and Richard Chapman Mudge, Eva Mudge attended Herman Strasburg House in Detroit, and was featured in the school's thirty-second annual exhibition of children's classes on May 6, 1887. The following year, Mudge made her professional debut on June 16 at the Whitney Opera House.

By late 1890, the Mudges had relocated to New York City, initially in Brooklyn, where Mudge performed in such venues as Holmes' Star Theater—located on Jay Street near Fulton—and the Novelty Theater, and with such companies as Gus Hill's World of Novelties and the Bigelow & Cook Dramatic Company. Around this time, however, and much to her chagrin, Mudge was compelled to take an involuntary sabbatical of several years, thanks to the intervention of NSPCC founder Elbridge Thomas Gerry. It was not until December 3, 1896, Mudge's 16th birthday, that she could finally shake off Gerry's well-intentioned constraints. Four days later, Mudge made her adult debut at Keith's Union Square. Reviewing Mudge's "grown-up" reboot, the Brooklyn Times-Union noted:

Her success was pronounced, and proved that Miss Mudge had scored her infantile hits as much through her cleverness as through her extreme youth.

== Automotive exploits ==
Mudge first obtained a driver's license in 1898 in New York state. The first working design of an automobile had only happened approximately five years before. Her first car was a Waverly electric which she drove on the streets of New York City.

Mudge may have been the first female to race a car. She chose the gasoline-powered Locomobile as her racing car. At the turn of the century most races involving women were "Ladies Only" races or distance races where women were there to show off the reliability of a car.

She was also the first woman to be involved in an auto accident. During a race she skidded on a patch of snow and knocked down five pedestrians. None were seriously injured.

The Automobile, in its December 1900 issue, published a brief profile entitled "A Skilled Chauffeuse," deeming Mudge an "expert and ardent [motorist] who knows how to drive an automobile anywhere it will go, [...] is not baffled by a short circuit or faulty contact [, and] can handle steam and gasoline machines, too." The following summer, The Boston Post reported an illegal, thoroughly impromptu race staged along Boston's Fenway, between an unwitting Mudge and an overmatched, increasingly irate, but ultimately understanding, mounted police officer. (Mudge had mistaken her pursuer for a civilian who simply wanted to race.)

== Return to the stage ==
In her later years, Mudge returned to the stage. In 1942, she appeared with Sylvia Sidney in a summer stock production of Marian de Forest's adaptation of Little Women, "giv[ing] a colorful performance in her role of irascible Aunt March, whose scoldings cover a good heart." A few months later, billed as Eva Mudge Nelson, she portrayed Miss M. Muse in the original Broadway production of Thornton Wilder's The Skin of Our Teeth. Of her performance as Mrs. Watty in the Pasadena Playhouse's 1945 revival of Emlyn Williams' The Corn is Green, Pasadena Star-News critic Robert O. Foote wrote:

Eva Mudge turns in another decrepit servant, this time with Salvation Army leanings, which is a thing of joy—she does more with a cocked eye than most actors can do with a whole gamut of gestures.

Later that year, both Foote and Los Angeles Times critic Katherine Von Blon praised Mudge's performance as Agatha, the maid, in the Playhouse production of Lillian Hellman's The Children's Hour. In 1951, Mudge appeared with Henry Fonda and her son-in-law John Cromwell in Paul Osborn's Point of No Return.

== Political advocacy ==
In October 1932, at the opening of South Pasadena's Roosevelt-Garner headquarters, and on at least one more occasion in the period leading up to the 1932 general election, Mudge spoke on behalf of the Democratic Party, the Roosevelt-Garner ticket and Charles J. Colden's campaign for the U.S. Congress.

== Personal life ==
Mudge's three marriages all ended in divorce. The first, from 1904 to 1914, was to Sanford Leroy Nelson, with whom she had her first child, actress Ruth Nelson. Mudge's second marriage, from approximately 1915 through June 12, 1928, was to Hans Henrik William Jorgensen, the father of her other two children, Grace Adelaide William-Jorgensen and stage actress Lynda Nelson. The third and final marriage—between Mudge and George C. Brundage, a wealthy associate of her friend, Walter E. "Death Valley Scotty" Scott—commenced in either late 1928 or early 1929, continuing until late October 1932.
