= Locomobile Sportif =

Vintage era luxury car

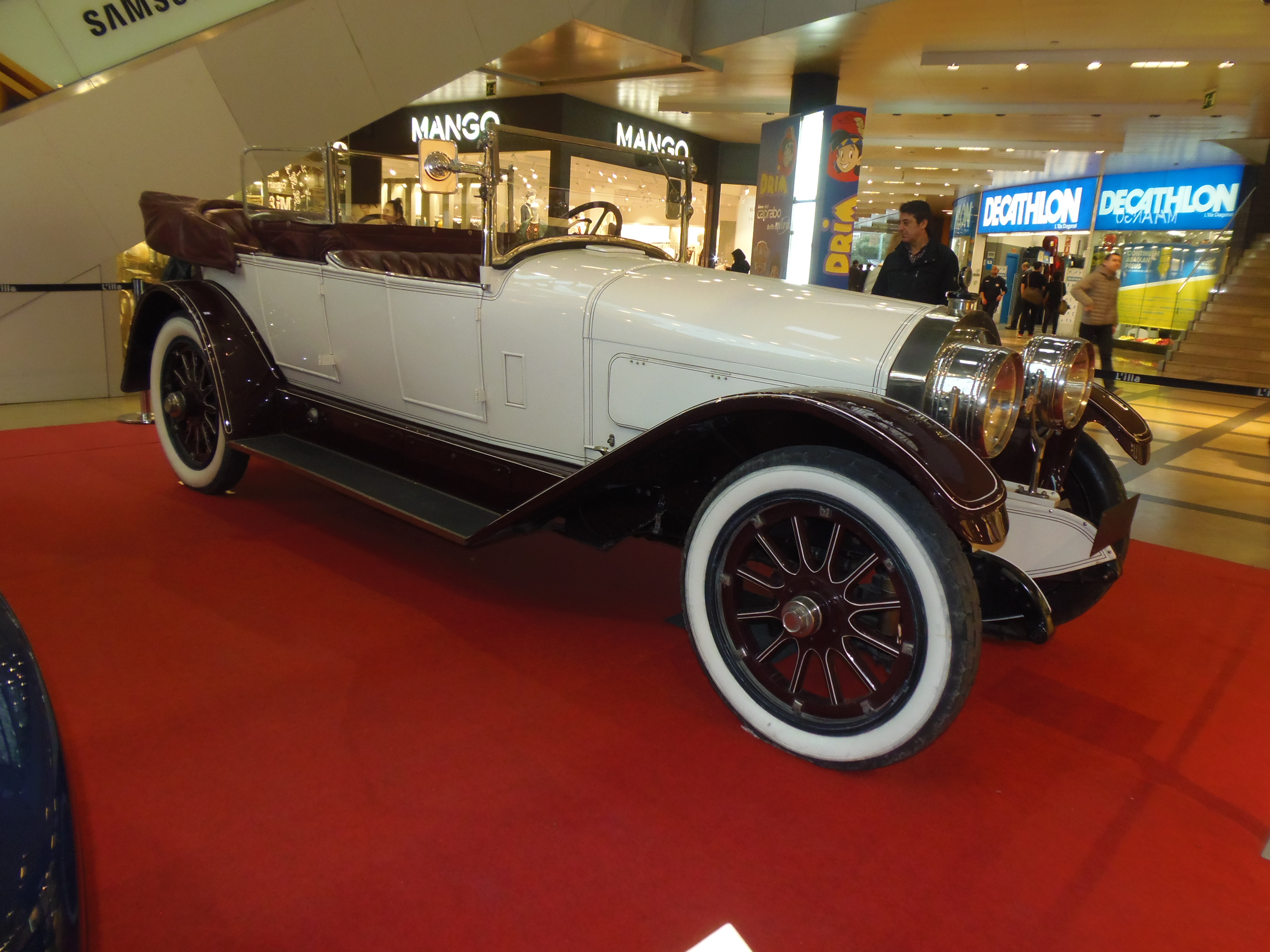
1918 Locomobile 48 Sportif

The Locomobile Sportif was a vintage era luxury car model manufactured by the Locomobile Company of America. Introduced in 1917, it was originally based on the Locomobile Model 48 chassis. From 1926 a Sportif version of the slightly smaller Model 90 was also produced.

== Locomobile Sportif specifications (1926 data) ==
- Color – Optional
- Seating Capacity – Four
- Wheelbase – 142 inches
- Wheels – Wood
- Tires – 35” × 5” cord; or, 35” × 6.75” balloon on order
- Service Brakes – Four wheel: foot brake, contracting on rear; internal expanding on front
- Emergency Brakes – Hand brake: internal expanding on rear
- Engine – Six cylinder, vertical, cast in pairs, 4½ × 5½ inches; head non-removable; valves in side; H.P. 48.6, N.A.C.C. rating
- Lubrication – Force feed and splash
- Crankshaft – Seven bearing
- Radiator – Cellular
- Cooling – Water pump
- Ignition – Delco, 12 volt, 2 spark
- Starting System – Two Unit
- Voltage – Twelve to Sixteen
- Wiring System – Single
- Gasoline System – Pressure
- Clutch – Dry multiple disc
- Transmission – Selective sliding
- Gear Changes – 4 forward, 1 reverse
- Drive – Spiral bevel
- Rear Springs – Three-quarter elliptic
- Rear Axle – Full floating
- Steering Gear – Worm and gear

=== Standard equipment ===
New car price included the following items:

- tools
- jack
- speedometer
- ammeter
- electric horn
- ignition theft lock
- automatic windshield cleaner
- demountable rims
- spare wheel
- power tire pump
- shock absorbers
- stop light
- inspection lamp and cord
- front bumper
- spare tire carrier
- rear view mirror
- cowl ventilator
- headlight dimmer
- clock
- closed cars have smoking case, vanity cases and dome light.

=== Optional equipment ===
The following was available at an extra cost:

- 35” × 6.75” balloon tires

=== Prices ===
New car prices were available F.O.B. factory plus tax on the following models:

- Chassis – $6600
- Four Passenger Sportif – $7400
- Seven Passenger Touring – $7400
- Touring Limousine – $9500
- Brougham – $9990
- Victoria Sedan – $9990
- Enclosed Drive Limousine – $9990
- Cabriolet – $10250

== See also ==
- Locomobile Company of America
