= Victor Steam =

Defunct American motor vehicle manufacturer

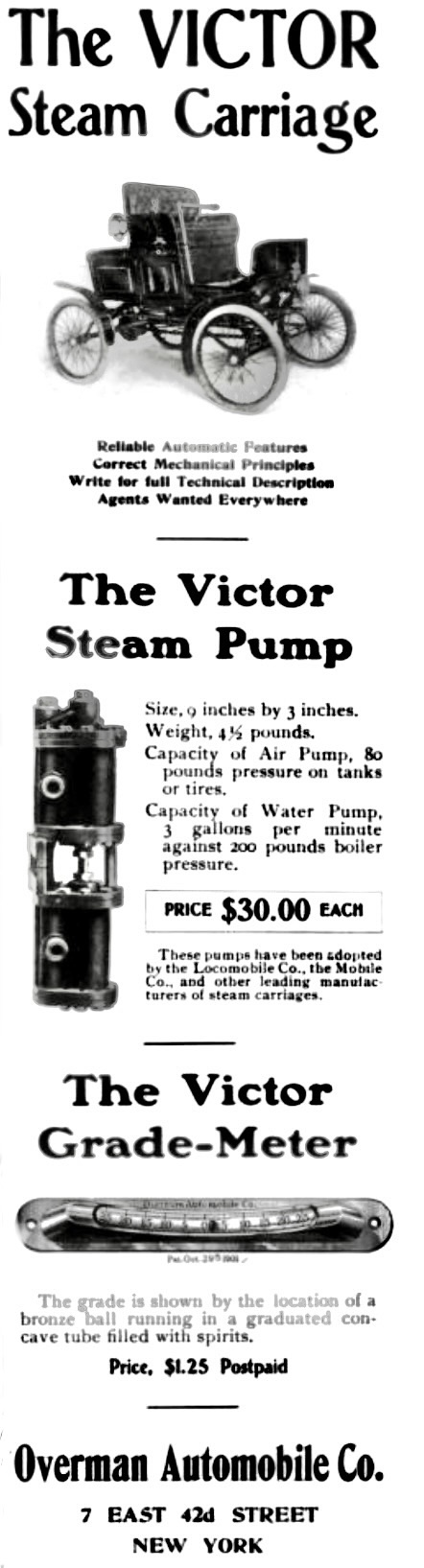
Victor Steam advertisement (1902)

Victor Steam was an American automobile company started in 1899. They made steam powered vehicles.

It had a 4 hp vertical 2-cylinder engine and single chain drive. In 1900, the Victor bicycle business was sold to the Stevens Arms & Tool Co., and for a few months Overman leased the top floor of the building to assemble Victor cars.
