= Andrew L. Riker =

American auto designer

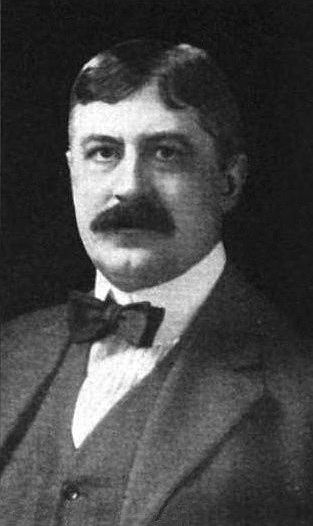
Andrew L. Riker

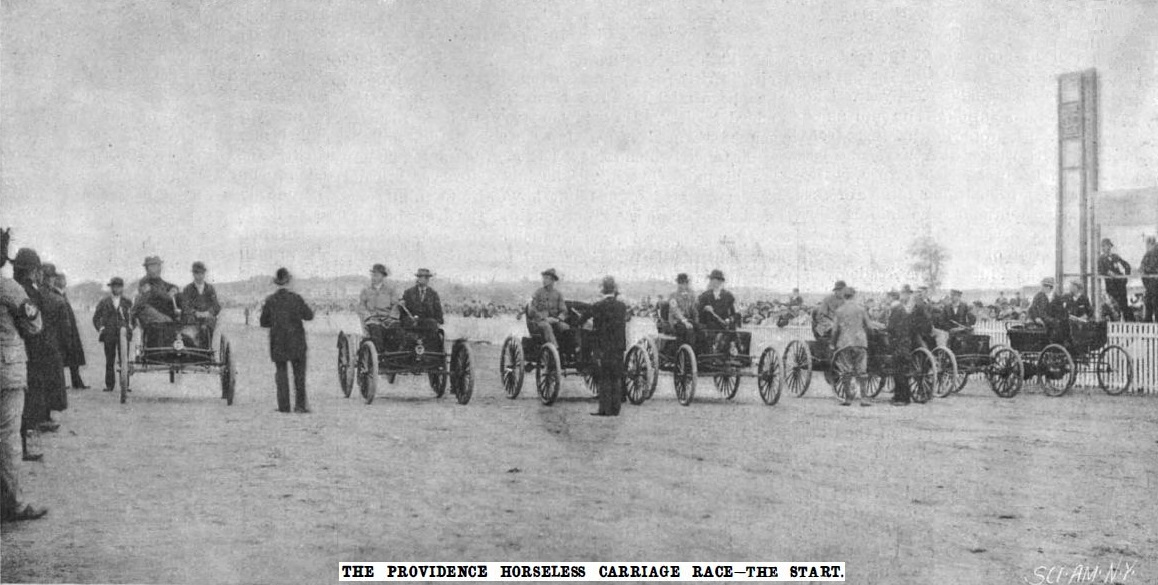
Providence Horseless Carriage Race (Sept. 1896)

Andrew Lawrence Riker (1868 – 1930) was an early automobile designer known for helping the U.S. car industry to transition from electric to gas-powered car manufacturing. He began experimenting with electric vehicles in 1884. He formed the Riker Electric Motor Company in 1888 to make electric motors, and a year later formed the Riker Motor Vehicle Company in Elizabeth, New Jersey. (advertised as "Elizabethport"). The company was absorbed by the Electric Vehicle Company in 1901.

Riker was hired afterwards by Locomobile for their ICE development.

Riker was a Co-Founder of the Society of Automotive Engineers in 1905 and served as the first president for three years.

== Wins ==
- 1896: Rhode Island State Fair (Providence, Sept. 7–11)
- 1900: Springfield Blvd-Babylon-Springfield (Apr. 14)
