= Albion A10 =

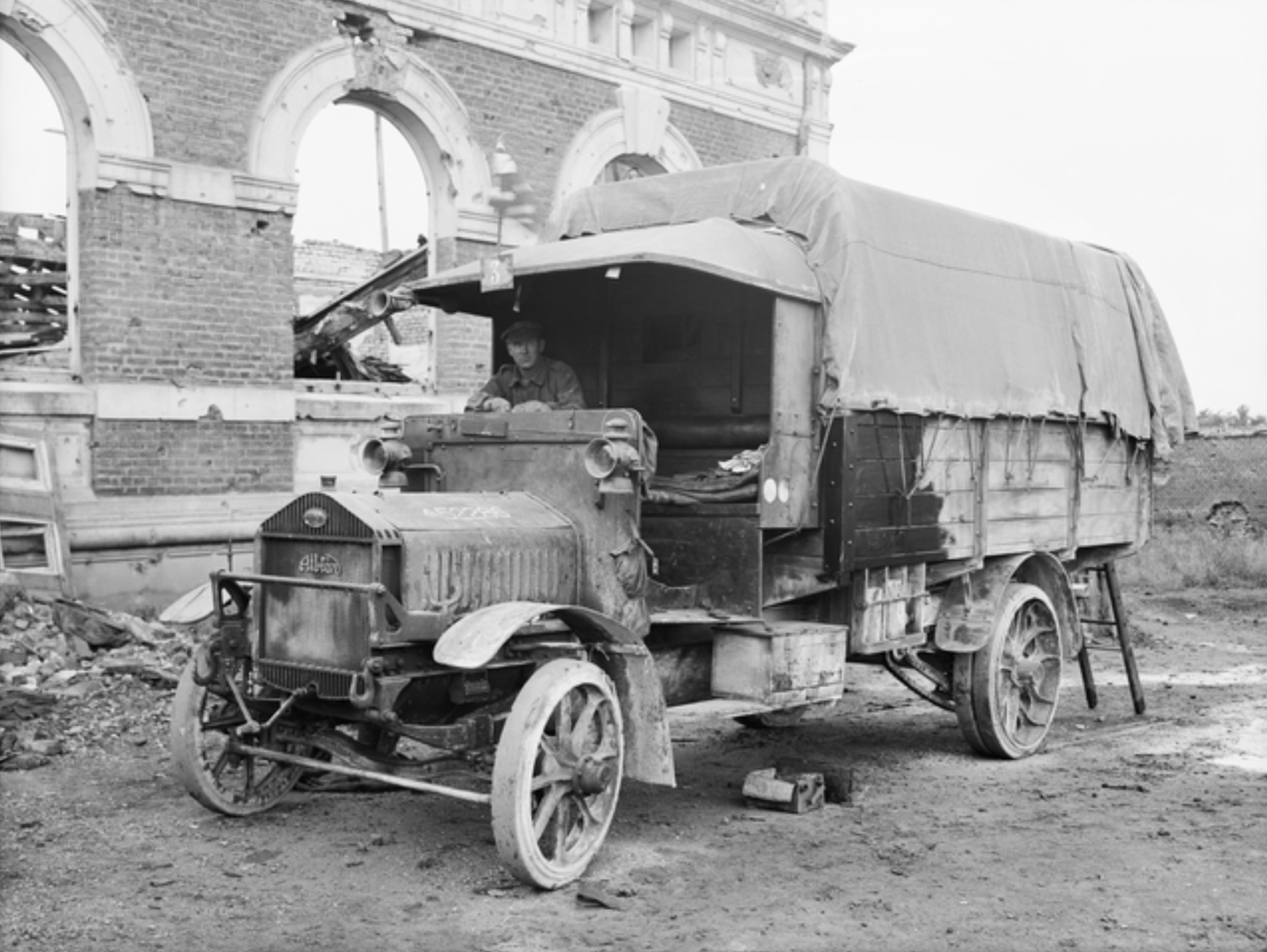
- Place of origin: United Kingdom

Service history
- Used by: British Empire
- Wars: First World War

Production history
- Manufacturer: Albion Motors
- Produced: 1910–1926
- No. built: Approximately 9,000

Specifications (WD pattern)
- Length: 18 ft (5.49 m) overall 13 ft 1 in (3.99 m) wheelbase
- Width: 8 ft (2.44 m)
- Crew: 1 (driver)
- Passengers: 2 (on bench seat)
- Engine: Albion 4-cylinder inline 318 cu in (5,210 cc) monobloc petrol 32.4 bhp (24.2 kW)
- Payload capacity: 3 long tons (3.05 t)
- Drive: RWD (chain driven rear wheels)
- Transmission: 4 forward, 1 reverse
- Suspension: Leaf springs
- References: Georgano & Demand, Gosling, Vanderveen and Ware

The Albion A10 was a British lorry built by Albion Motors. Introduced in 1910, the A10 saw widespread service with the British military during the First World War, and post-war it continued in production until 1926.

== Design ==
The A10 was a cab behind engine, rear wheel drive truck, initially it had a civilian payload capacity of 3 long tons (3.05 t) and from 1913 that was increased to 4 long tons (4.06 t). Post-1913 the A10 had a 13 ft 1 in (3.99 m) wheelbase, in military service the lorry was 18 ft (5.49 m) in overall length, and 18 ft (5.49 m) in width.

The A10 was powered by an Albion 4-cylinder inline petrol monobloc engine with high-tension magneto ignition. The engine had a capacity of 318 cu in (5,210 cc) and developed 32.4 bhp (24.2 kW). The A10 was driven through a 4-speed constant-mesh transmission with a single plate clutch to double chain driven rear wheels. It was fitted with leaf spring suspension, a foot actuated transmission brake and hand actuated rear drum brakes.

== History ==
Prior to 1910, Albion Motor's lorry production had predominantly consisted of the A3 model, which had a payload capacity of 2 long tons (2.03 t) and was powered by a 12 hp (8.9 kW) 2-cylinder inline engine. In 1910 Albion introduced the larger A10 model with a payload capacity of 3 long tons (3.05 t) and a more powerful and greatly modernised 4-cylinder engine. In 1913 the A10 was upgraded with an increased payload capacity of 4 long tons (4.06 t), a longer wheelbase, and strengthened chassis, suspension and rear axle. With the outbreak of the First World War, Albion turned over production to supply A10s to the British War Office, and by the end of the war they had supplied 5,563 A10s to the military.

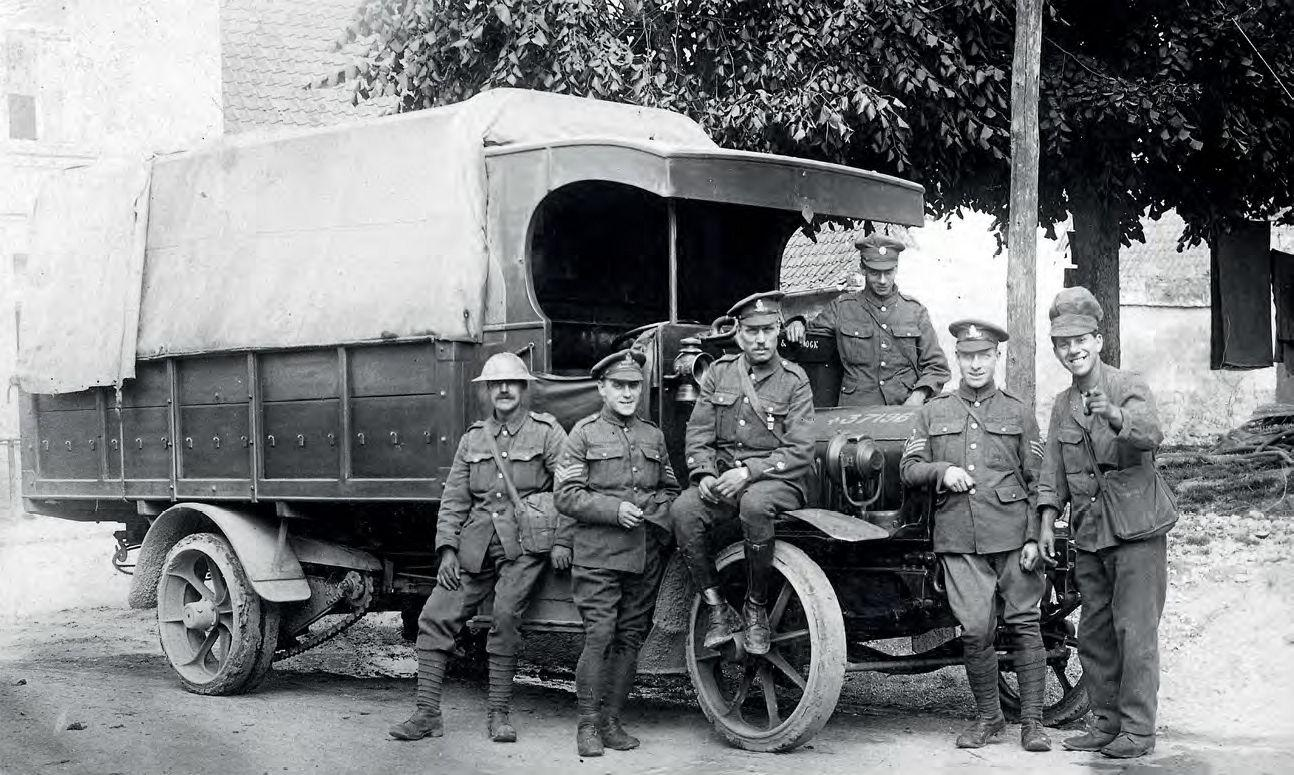
Soldiers pose with an A10 during the Salonika Campaign.

In military service the A10 had a payload capacity of 3 long tons (3.05 t) (Note: In First World War British military service, trucks with a civilian payload capacity of 4 to 5 long tons (4.06 to 5.08 t) frequently had a military payload rating of 3 long tons (3.05 t). This was due to a variety of reasons including the rigours of military operations, the propensity for drivers to overload the vehicles, and commercial trucks not needing to account for a crew of three and all of their kit.) and was fitted with a number of bodies including General Service cargo vehicles, troop transports, petrol tankers and mobile medical clinics. The Albion A10 was widely used by the militaries of the British Empire on the Western Front as well as a number of other theatres including Greece, Palestine and India. In the Sinai and Palestine campaign A10s and Peerless TC4s formed the majority of heavy motor transport in British military service, the A10 was praised for its reliability and, due to its lighter weight, its capacity to cross terrain that the Peerless lorries found challenging, although the Peerless was preferred on hilly routes due to its more powerful engine. From 1916, the A10 also became the most commonly used heavy motor transport in military service in India, supporting operations on the North-West Frontier Theatre. The A10 remained the most common heavy motor transport in Indian Army service in the post-war years. In the early 1920s, the Royal Army Service Corps engaged Armstrong Siddeley to convert a number of military Albion A10s into half-tracks.

After the war, Albion developed a new range of lorries of between 25 long cwt (1.27 t) and 4 long tons (4.06 t), all of which had worm driven live rear axles. Despite this the A10 continued in production for civilian customers until 1926, (Note: Some sources claim production of the A10 ceased in 1927.) when production finally ceased approximately 9,000 A10s had been produced by Albion.
