= Pierce-Arrow armoured lorry =

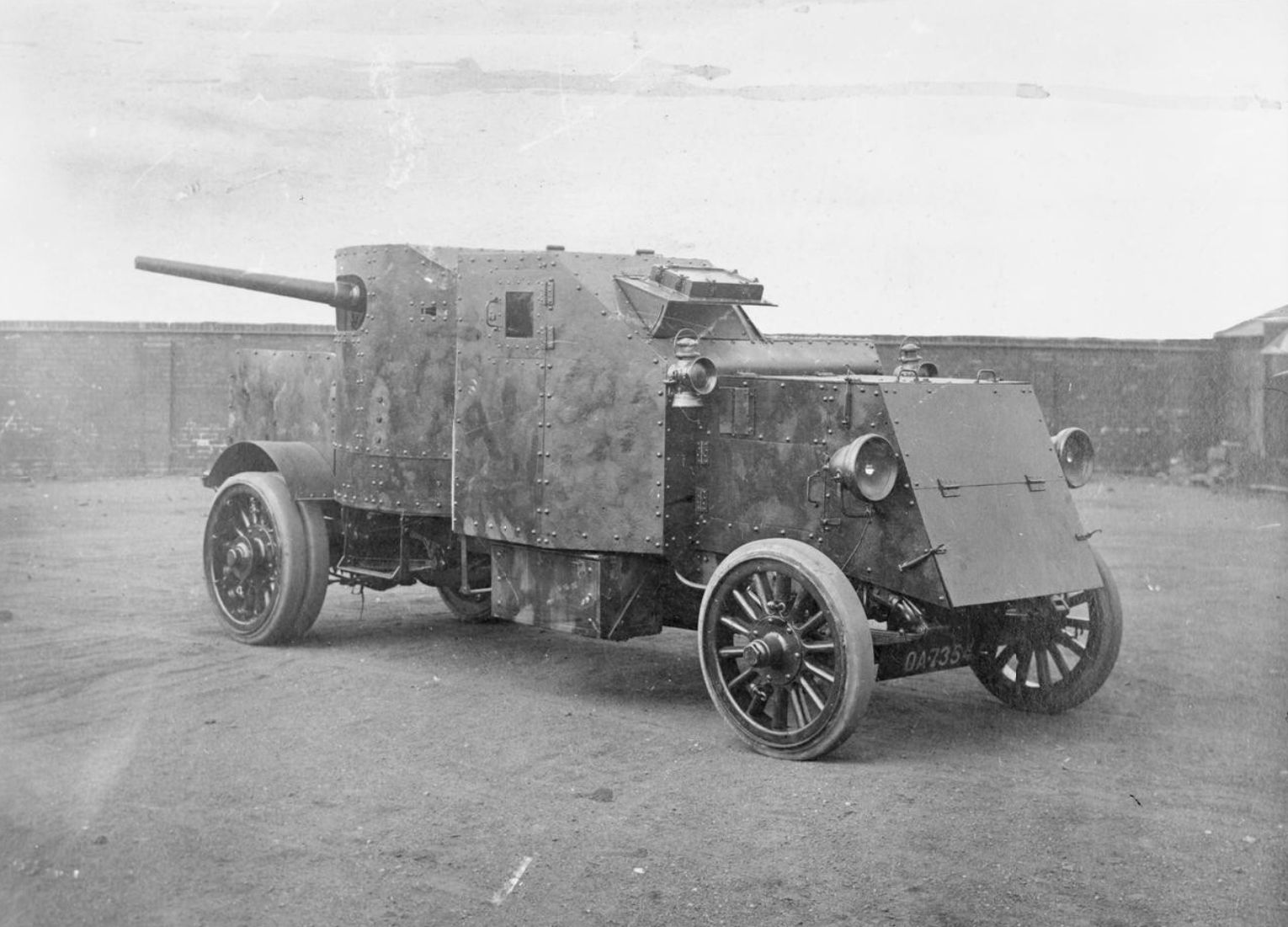
- Type: Armoured car
- Place of origin: United Kingdom

Service history
- In service: 1916–1918
- Used by: Royal Naval Air Service
- Wars: First World War

Production history
- Manufacturer: W. G. Allen & Sons, Tipton & John Shearman & Co, Newport
- Produced: 1916
- No. built: 2

Specifications
- Armour: 5/8 in (15.9 mm)
- Main armament: 1 x QF 3-pounder (47 mm) Vickers
- Engine: 4-cylinder petrol 30 hp (22 kW)
- Drive: 4x2
- Suspension: Leaf springs

The Pierce-Arrow armoured lorry was a heavy armoured car mounting a QF 3-pounder Vickers gun, it was used by the Royal Naval Air Service during the First World War.

== Design ==
The Pierce-Arrow armoured lorry was a turreted armoured lorry based on an imported American Pierce-Arrow Model R 5-ton truck chassis with added armoured bodywork, it was armed with a turreted QF 3-pounder Vickers gun. The Pierce-Arrow had a front mounted engine protected by folding armoured panels, behind the engine was an enclosed driver's compartment a single two armoured shutter, the turret was behind the driver's compartment. The Pierce-Arrow armoured lorry used the same chassis as the Pierce-Arrow armoured AA lorry, it used identical bonnet armour as the latter whilst the driver's compartment was reduced to half width to allow the main gun to fire forwards.

== History ==
Construction of the two Pierce-Arrow armoured lorries was carried out by W. G. Allen & Sons in Tipton, who used 5/8 inch (15.9 mm) armoured plate for the fighting compartment, the turret turntables were manufactured by John Shearman & Co at Newport, Wales, where the RNAS had a depot to service armoured cars. The two vehicles were dispatched to Russia in 1916 with No 1 Squadron, Royal Naval Armoured Car Division under Commander Oliver Locker-Lampson for the expedition to Russia and the Caucasus. Throughout the campaign the Pierce-Arrows provided heavy fire support to the lighter Lanchester armoured cars that made up the bulk of the force. In Russia the weight proved to be too heavy for the chassis so the turrets were removed, and the guns were mounted on a pedestal with a shield, and the hull sides were filled in with flat plates.

== See also ==
- List of combat vehicles of World War I
