= Albion Motors =

Former Scottish vehicle manufacturer

Albion Motors Limited
- Formerly: Albion Motor Car Company Limited (1899–1951)
- Industry: Automotive
- Founded: 1899
- Founder: Norman Fulton; John Henderson; Thomas Murray
- Defunct: 1972
- Successor: Leyland
- Headquarters: Glasgow, Scotland, UK
- Products: Buses; Cars; Commercial vehicles
- Parent: British Leyland

Albion Motors was a Scottish automobile and commercial vehicle manufacturer.

Founded in 1899, Albion Motors was purchased by Leyland Motors in 1951. Vehicles continued to be manufactured under the Albion brand until 1972. After that, they were still produced but sold under the Leyland brand. Vehicle production at the former Albion factory in the Scotstoun area of Glasgow, Scotland, continued until 1980.

== History ==
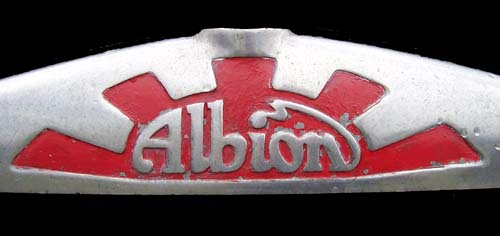
Albion Motors radiator badge

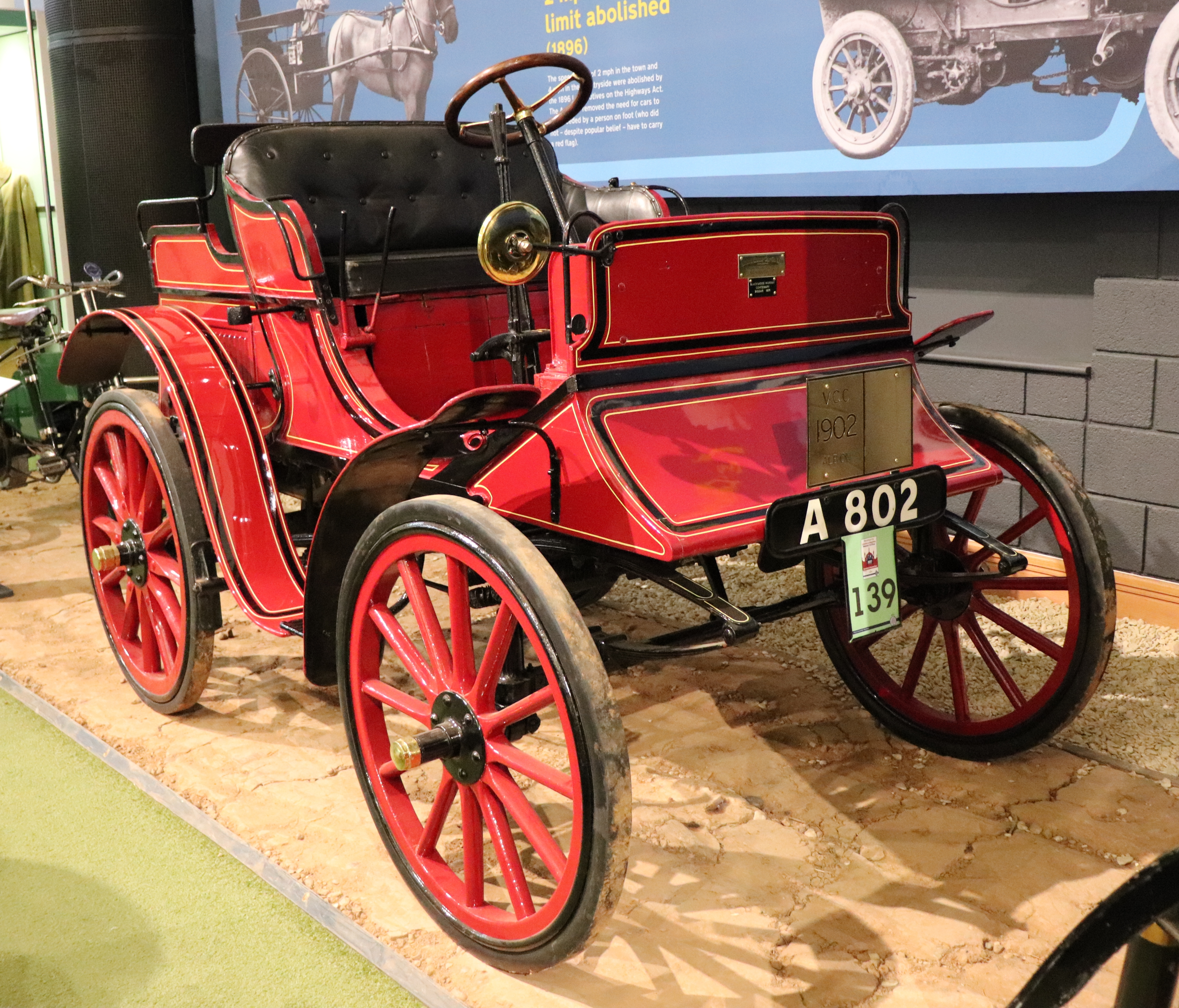
Albion 1902

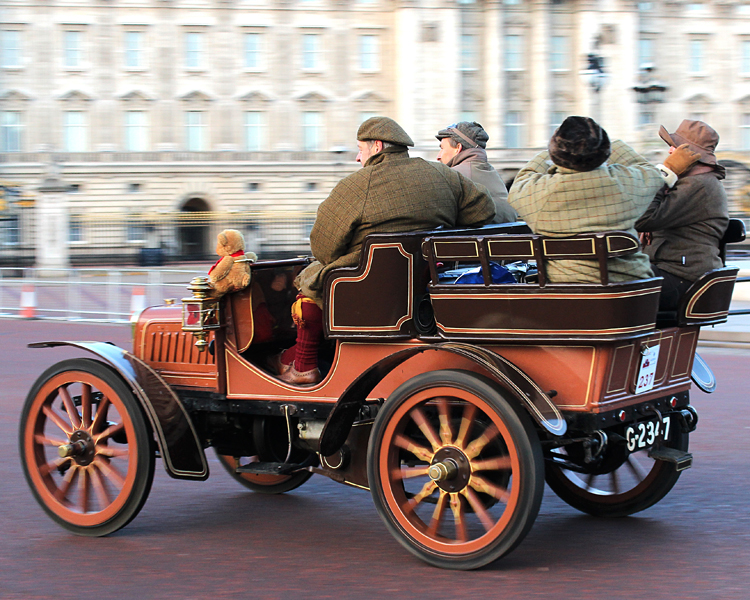
Albion 16HP Wagonette 1904

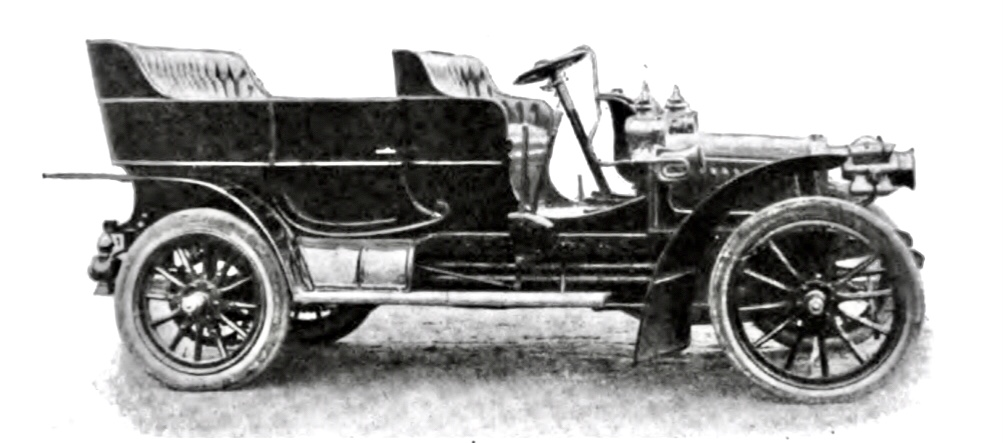
Albion 16 HP (1905–1913)

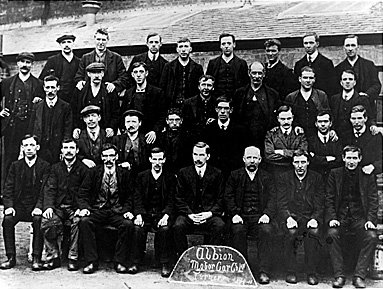
Workers at Albion Motors in 1911

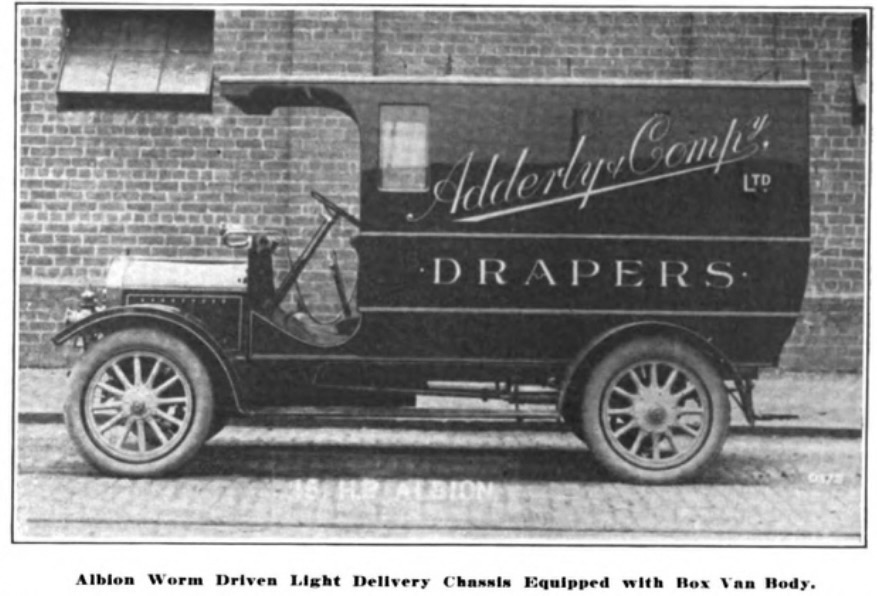
Albion A14 (1911-1914)

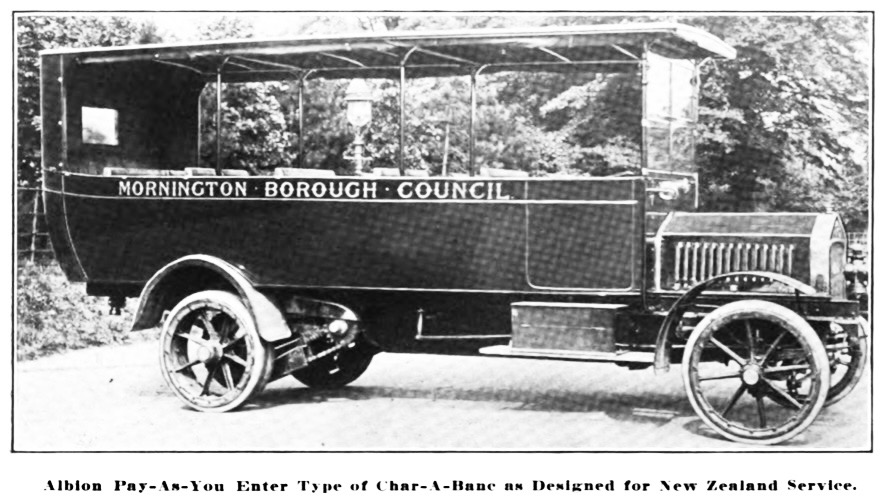
Albion Bus (1913)

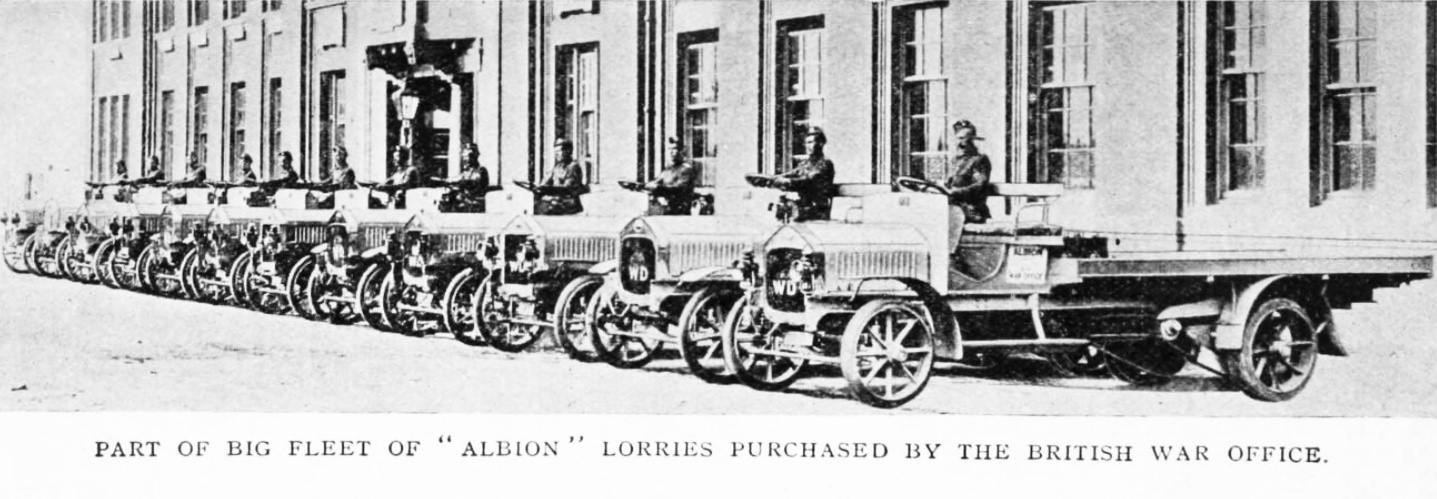
Albion Motors Lorries (1914).

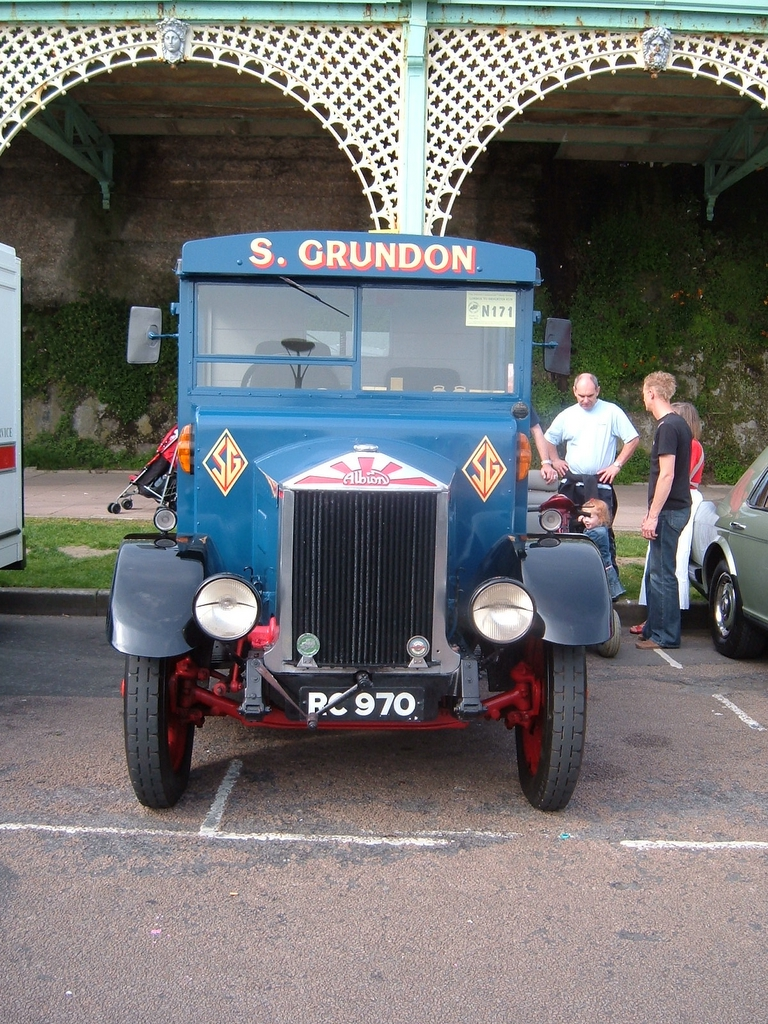
Front of an earlier model

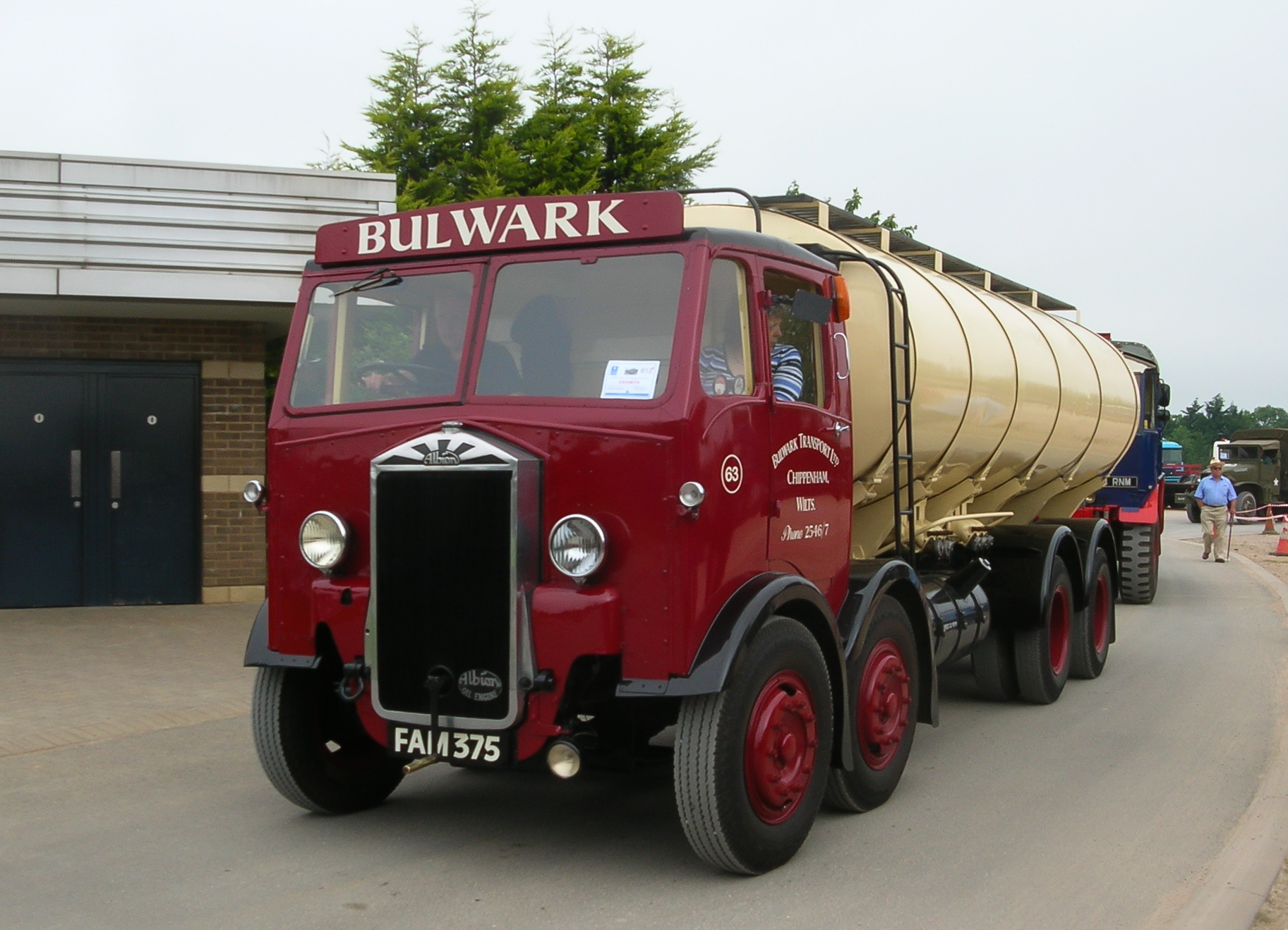
Albion CX7 8-wheel tanker 1948

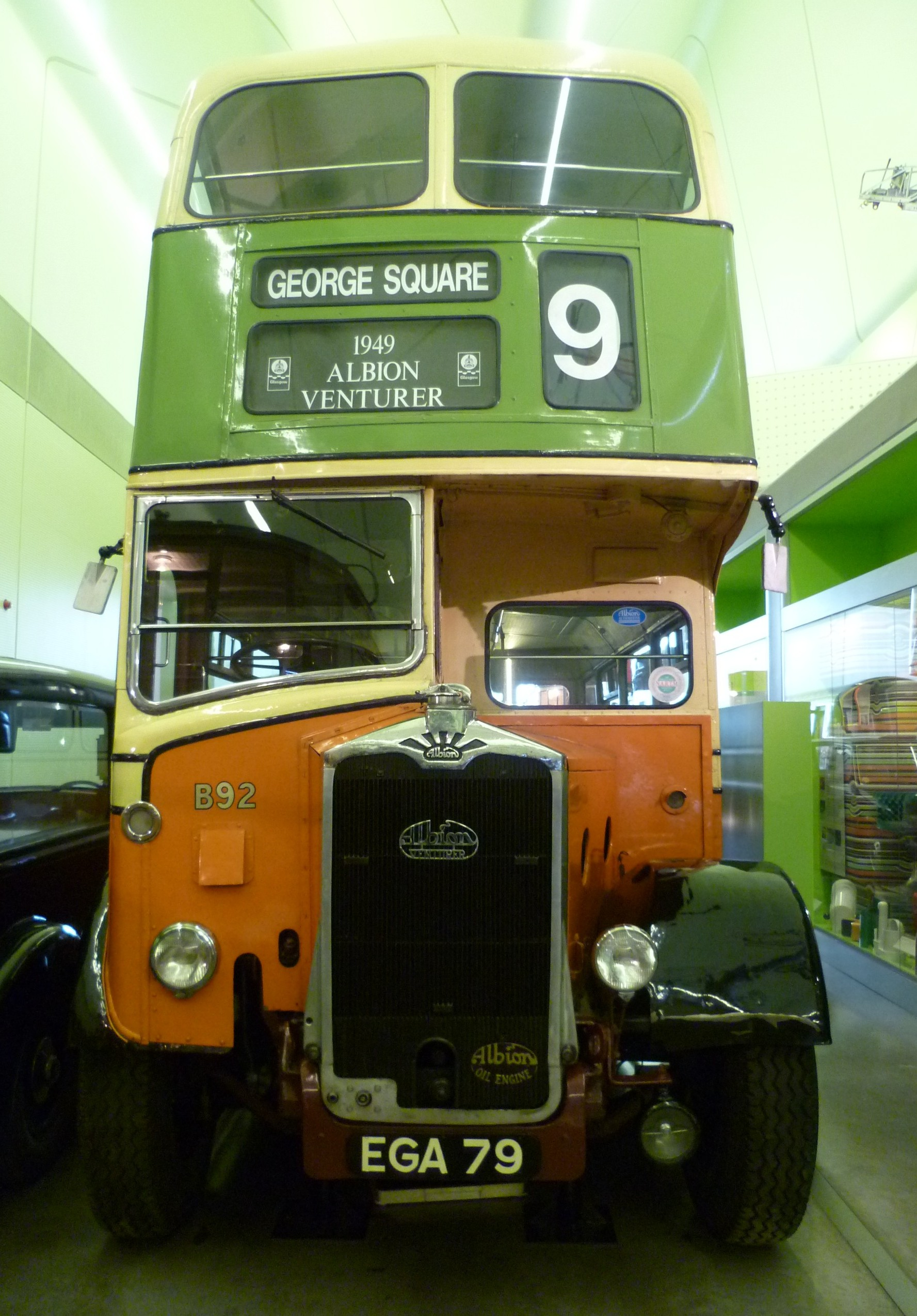
Albion Venturer 1949

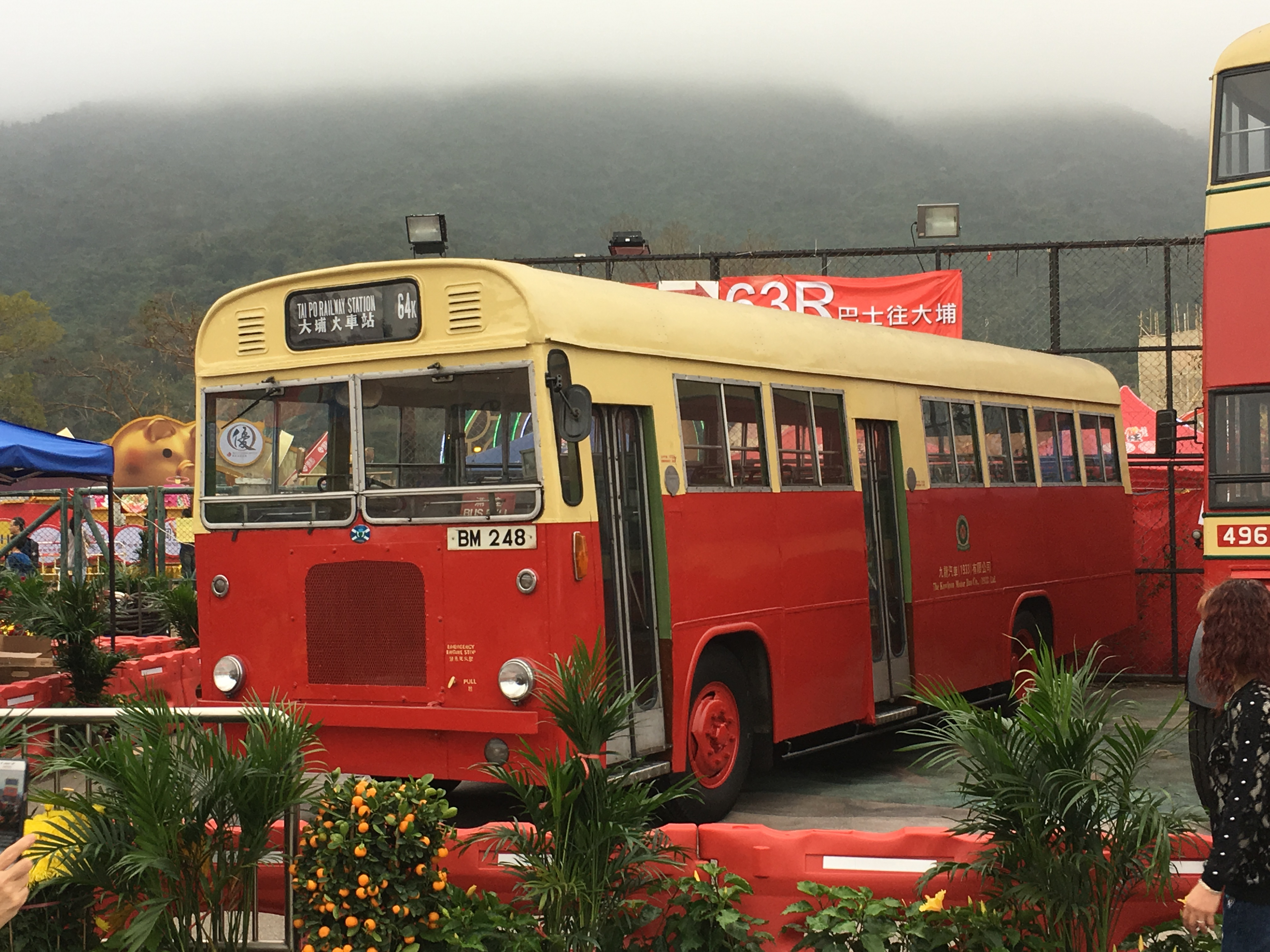
An Albion Viking EVK preserved by Kowloon Motor Bus at Hong Kong. Photo taken in February 2019.

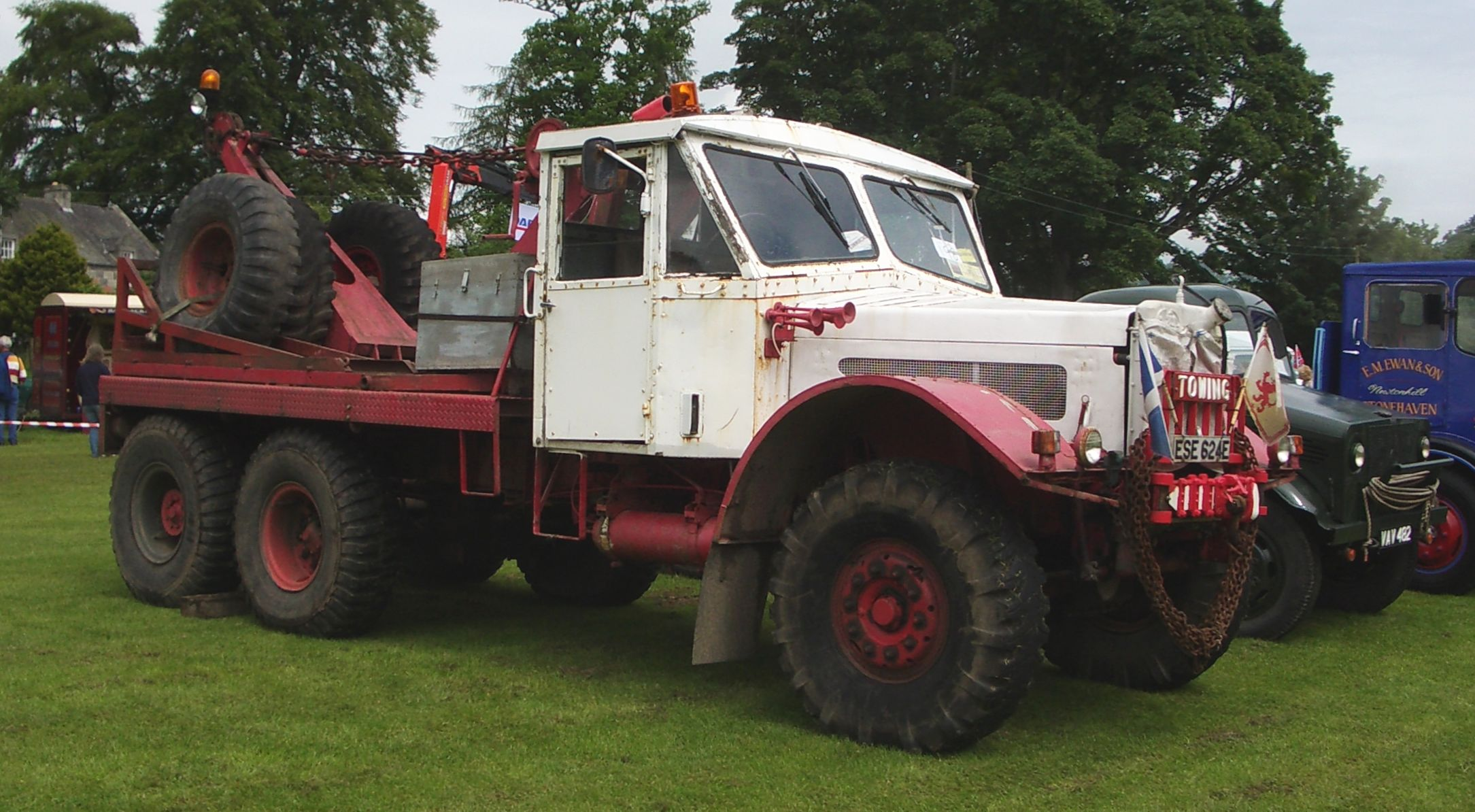
Heavy-duty Albion CX24 recovery truck

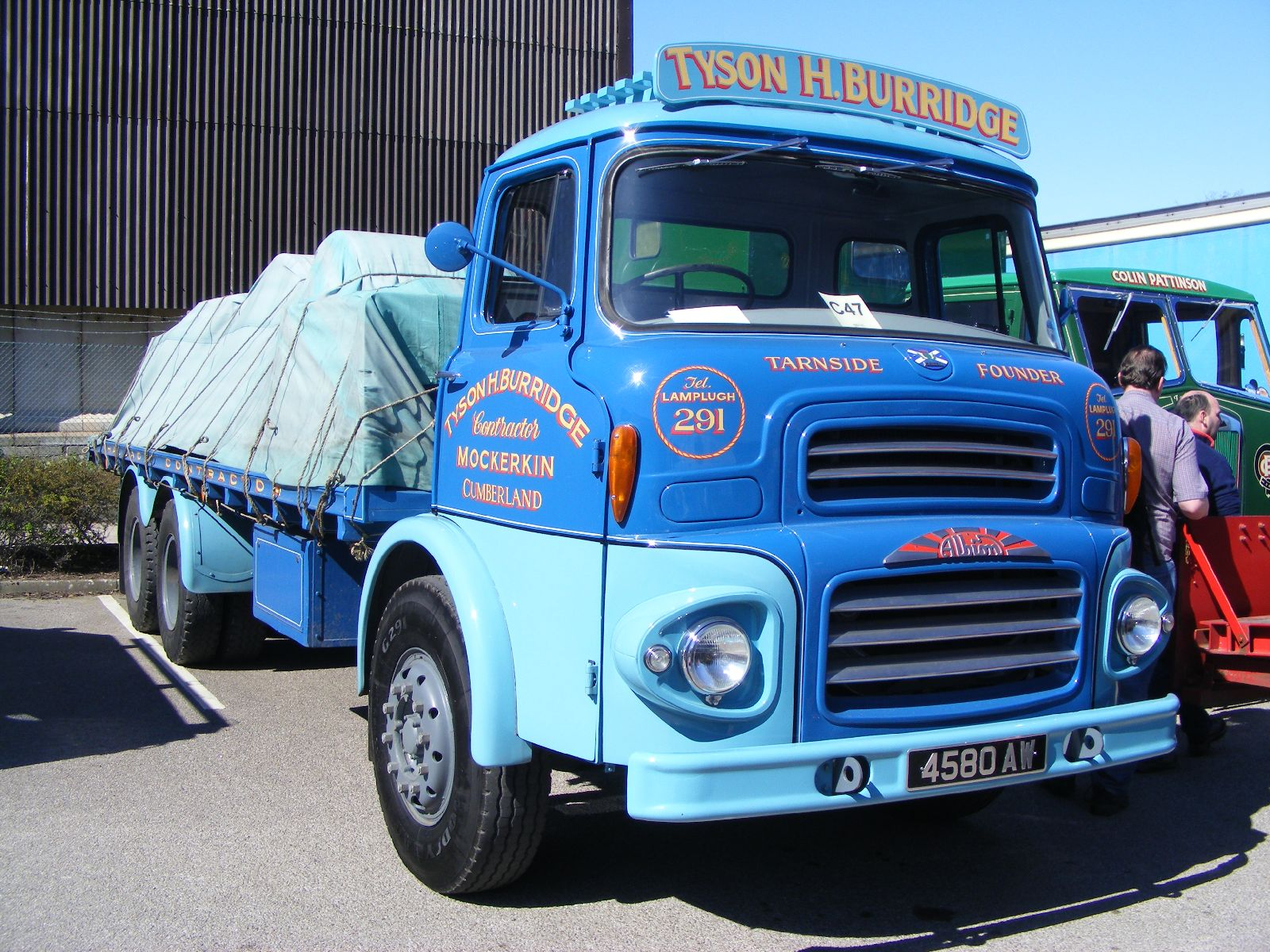
Albion Reiver 1963

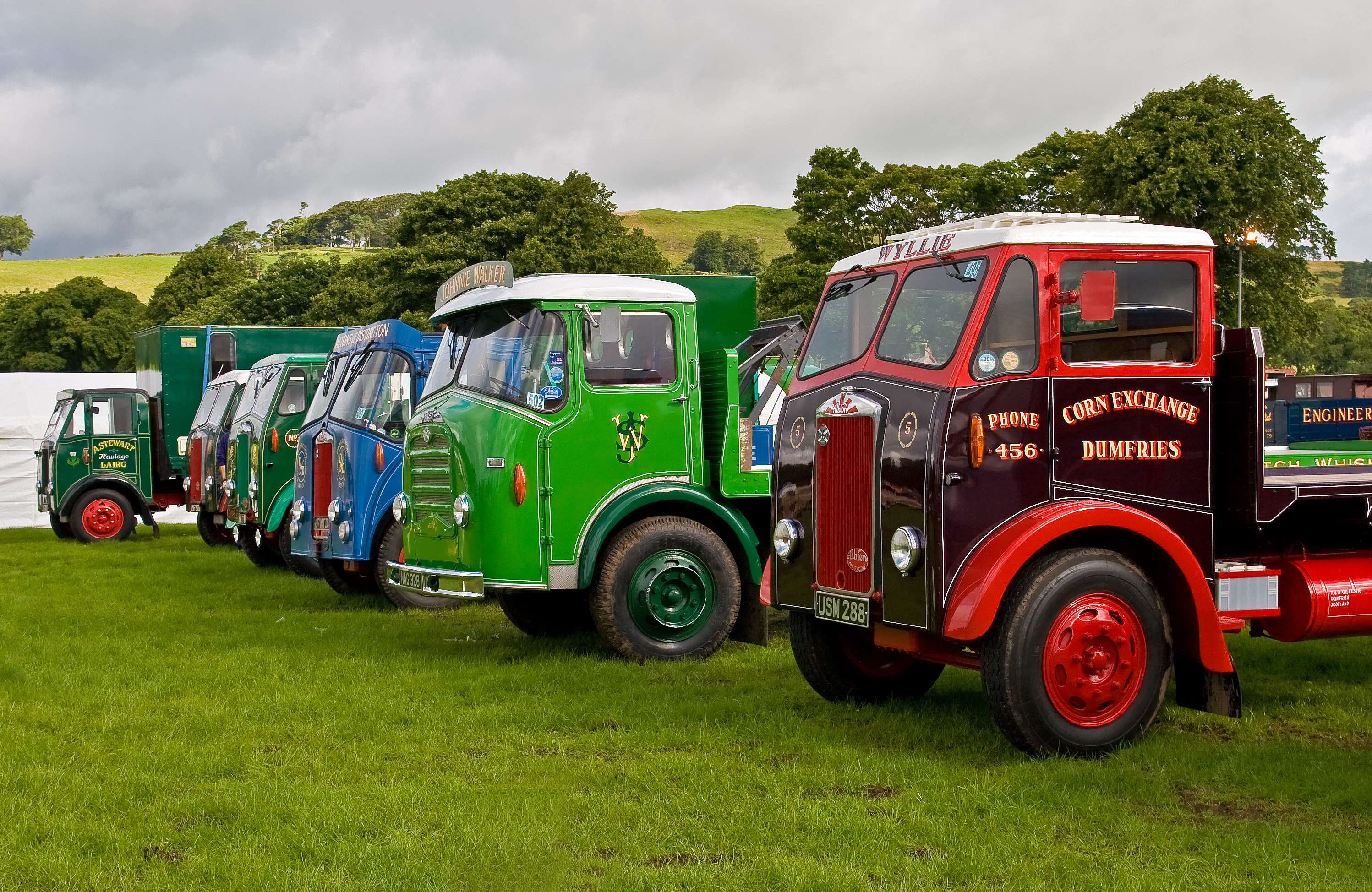
Albion Commercial Vehicles at Biggar Vintage Rally, August 2008

Originally known as Albion Motor Car Company Ltd, the company was founded in 1899 by Thomas Blackwood Murray and Norman Osborne Fulton (both of whom had previously been involved in Arrol-Johnston). Murray's father, John Lamb Murray mortgaged the Heavyside estate in Biggar, South Lanarkshire, to provide the initial capital. They were joined a couple of years later by John F Henderson who provided additional capital. The factory was originally on the first floor of a building in Finnieston Street, Glasgow and had only seven employees. In 1903 the company moved to new premises in Scotstoun.

In April 1931, the Albion Motor Car Company Ltd was renamed Albion Motors Ltd with its vehicles featuring the sunrise badge. In 1951, Albion was purchased by Leyland Motors, which then became part of the British Leyland Motor Corporation in 1968. Production of the Chieftain, Clydesdale and Reiver trucks and of the Viking bus models continued. In 1969, the company took over the neighbouring Coventry Ordnance Works on South Street, which it used for truck component manufacture. British Leyland eliminated the Albion name in 1972 with the products continuing to be built at the same factory under the Leyland brand. In 1980, vehicle production at the former Albion factory ceased, moving to the British Leyland plant at Bathgate, however component manufacturing continued.

British Leyland was renamed Rover Group in 1986. In 1987 the component manufacturing plant became part of Leyland DAF, the newly formed British arm of the Anglo-Dutch company DAF NV, formed by the merger of Rover Group's Leyland Trucks division and the Dutch DAF Trucks company.

Following the collapse of DAF in 1993, Leyland DAF went into receivership, and the truck components business in Scotstoun was subject to a management buyout and transferred to a newly created company called Albion Automotive. In 1998, Albion Automotive was acquired by American Axle & Manufacturing Company of Detroit. The new company manufactures axles, driveline systems, chassis systems, crankshafts and chassis components.

=== Passenger car manufacturing ===
In 1900 the company built its first motor car, a rustic-looking dogcart made of varnished wood, powered by a flat-twin 8hp engine with gear-change by "Patent Combination Clutches" and solid tyres.

In 1903 Albion introduced a 3115 cc 16 hp vertical-twin, followed in 1906 by a 24 hp four. One of the specialities the company offered was solid-tyred shooting-brakes. The last private Albions were powered by a 15 hp monobloc four of 2492 cc.

Passenger car production ceased in 1915 but in 1920 the company announced that estate cars were available again based on a small bus chassis, it is not known if any were actually made.

==== Car models ====
- Albion 8 (1900–1904) 2080 cc twin-cylinder
- Albion 12 (1900–1906) 2659 cc twin-cylinder
- Albion 16 (1905–1913) 3141 cc twin-cylinder
- Albion 24/30 (1906–1912) 4175 cc 4-cylinder
- Albion 15 (1912–1915) 2492 cc 4-cylinder

=== Commercial vehicle production ===
Although the manufacture of motor cars was the main industry in the first ten years of its existence, it was decided in 1909 to concentrate on the production of commercial vehicles. During World War I, the company built a large quantity of 3-ton trucks for the War Office, powered by a 32-horsepower (24 kW) engine, using chain drive to the rear wheels. After the war many of them were converted for use as charabancs.

Trucks and buses (single- and double-deckers) were manufactured in the Scotstoun works until 1980 (1972 for complete vehicles). The buses were exported to Asia, East Africa, Australia, India and South Africa. Almost all Albion buses were given names beginning with "V", these models being the Victor, Valiant, Viking, Valkyrie, and Venturer.

==== Lorry models ====
- A10 (1910–1926)
- A14 (1911-1914)
- DB 1,5 t
- BW 2,25 t
- BB 2,75 t
- BP 2,75 t
- BL 3,7 t
- BN 3,7 t
- BT 3,5 t
- CX22S Heavy artillery tractor.
- WD66N (only 9 built).
- WD.CX24 Tank transporter
- Chieftain (1948)
- Clansman
- Claymore (1954–1966)
- Clydesdale
- Reiver

Albion also made the Claymore with a 4-speed gearbox. The Reiver was a six-wheeler. The Chieftain had a six-speed gearbox, sixth being an overdrive gear, with a worm and wheel rear axle.

==== Bus production ====
The earliest buses were built on the A10 truck chassis with two being delivered to West Bromwich in 1914. Newcastle upon Tyne also took double-deckers at around that time, but Albion did not produce a purpose-built double-deck chassis until 1931.

In 1923, the first dedicated bus chassis was announced, derived from the one used on the 25 long cwt (2,800 lb; 1,300 kg) truck but with better springing. Bodies seating from 12 to 23 passengers were available. A lower-frame chassis, the Model 26, with 30 to 60 hp (22 to 45 kW) engine and wheelbases from 135 to 192 inches (3,400 to 4,900 mm) joined the range in 1925. All the early vehicles had been normal control, with the engine in front of the driver but in 1927 the first forward control with the engine alongside the driver was announced as the Viking allowing 32 seats to be fitted. Diesel engines, initially from Gardner, were available from 1933. The first double-deck design was the Venturer of 1932, with up to 51 seats. The CX version of the chassis was launched in 1937, with the engine and gearbox mounted together, rather than being joined by a separate drive shaft. Albion's own range of diesel engines was also made available.

After World War II, the range was progressively modernised and underfloor-engined models were introduced, with two prototypes in 1951, and production models from 1955 with the Nimbus.

With the Leyland take over, the range was cut back. The last Albion double-decker was the 1961 Lowlander, which was marketed in England as a Leyland, and the last design of all was the Viking, re-using an old name.

===== Bus models =====
- Model 24 (1923–1924) First purpose built Albion bus chassis
- Model 26 (1926–1932)
- Viking 24 (1924–1932) Various wheelbases from 10 ft 9 in (3.28 m) to 16 ft 3 in (4.95 m) Front-wheel brakes from 1927. Six-cylinder engines available in Viking Sixes.
- Valkyrie (1930–1938) Forward control. 5 litre engine, 6.1 litre from 1933, 7.8 litre optional from 1935. Mainly sold as coaches.
- Valiant (1931–1936) Mainly sold to the coach market.
- Victor (1930–1939) Normal or forward control. 20 or 24 seater.
- Venturer (1932–1939) Albions first double-decker. 51, later 55 seats. 3-axle version, the Valorous, made in 1932, only one produced.
- Valkyrie CX (1937–1950) Engine and gearbox in-unit.
- Venturer CX (1937–1951) Double-decker.
- Victor FT (1947–1959) Lightweight single-decker
- Valiant CX (1948–1951) Mostly sold to coach operators.
- Viking CX (1948–1952) Mainly sold to the export market.
- KP71NW (1951) Underfloor-engined chassis with horizontally opposed eight cylinder engine; 2 built.
- Nimbus (1955–1963) Underfloor engine.
- Aberdonian (1957–1960) Underfloor engine.
- Royal Scot (1959) 15.2 litre underfloor-engined 6×4 dirt-road bus. 20 built for South African Railways.
- Victor VT (1959–1966) Front-engined, derived from Chieftain truck chassis.
- Clydesdale (1959–1979) Export model built on truck chassis.
- Talisman TA (1959) 9.8 litre front-engined 6x4 dirt-road bus. 5 built for Rhodesian Railways.
- Lowlander (1961–1966) Double-decker. 18 ft 6 in (5.64 m) wheelbase. LR7 had air rear suspension.
- Viking VK (1963–1980) Mainly exported. Leyland O.370 O:400, O:401 engines. VK 41,55 were front-engined; VK43,45,49,57,67 models were rear-engined, Australian market had optional AEC AV505 engines.
- Valiant VL (1967–1972) Similar to rear-engined Vikings but with tropical cooling unit as on VK45 and axles from Clydesdale.

=== Firearms production ===
During World War II, Albion Motors manufactured Enfield No 2 Mk I* revolvers to aid the war effort. By 1945, 24,000 Enfield No 2 Mk I* revolvers were produced by Albion (and subsequently, Coventry Gauge & Tool Co.)

== See also ==
- List of car manufacturers of the United Kingdom
