= Pierce-Arrow Model X =

1911 American heavy truck

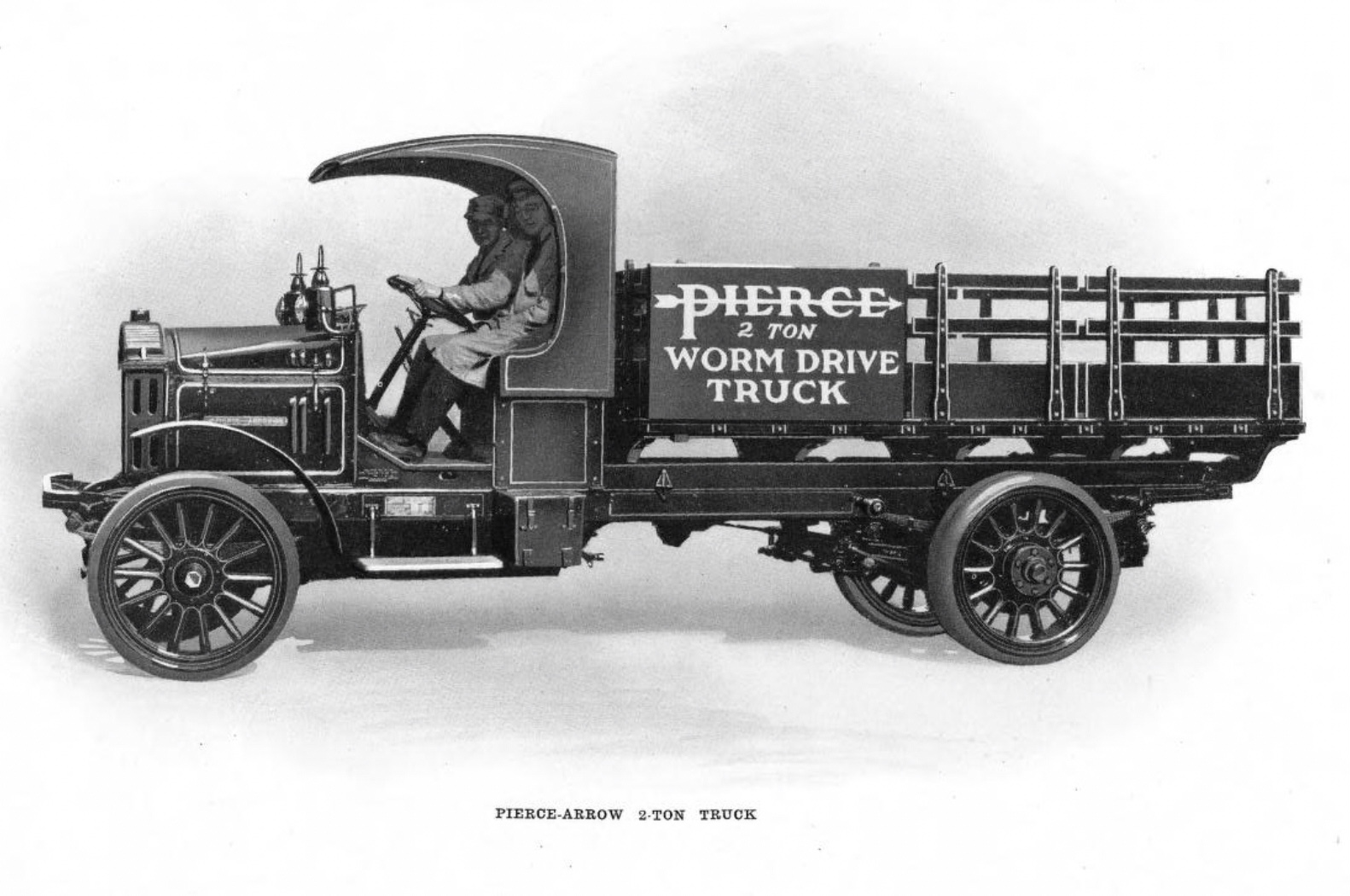

Overview
- Manufacturer: Pierce-Arrow Motor Car Company
- Production: 1913–1922
- Designer: H. Kerr Thomas & John Younger

Body and chassis
- Body style: 2-ton truck
- Layout: Cab behind engine

Powertrain
- Engine: 4-cylinder inline petrol 25.6 hp (19.1 kW) (Note: S.A.E. or N.A.C.C. horsepower rating.)
- Transmission: 3-forward, 1-reverse
- Propulsion: 4x2

Dimensions
- Wheelbase: 12 ft 6 in (3.81 m) standard 15 ft (4.57 m) extra long
- Length: 18 ft 6 in (5.64 m) standard 21 ft 6 in (6.55 m) extra long
- Width: 5 ft 6 in (1.68 m)

The Pierce-Arrow Model X was a truck model manufactured by the American firm Pierce-Arrow Motor Car Company from 1913 to 1922. The Pierce-Arrow Model X was used in very large numbers by French and US militaries during the First World War.

== Design ==
The Model X was a cab behind engine, rear-wheel drive truck with a payload capacity of 2 short tons (1.79 long tons; 1.81 t). The Model X was available in two chassis lengths, the standard chassis had a wheelbase of 12 ft 6 in (3.81 m) and an overall chassis length of 18 ft 6 in (5.64 m), the extra long chassis had a wheelbase of 15 ft (4.57 m) and an overall chassis length of 21 ft 6 in (6.55 m). The bare chassis was 5 ft 6 in (1.68 m) in width.

The Model X was powered by a 4-cylinder inline 25.6 hp (19.1 kW) T-head petrol engine with a bore and stroke of 4 by 5 1/2 in (102 by 140 mm), ignition was by magneto, a 13 US gal (11 imp gal; 49 L) fuel tank was standard. The truck was driven through a three-speed transmission and the rear axle featured worm final drive. It was fitted with a foot actuated transmission brake and hand actuated rear drum brakes.

== History ==
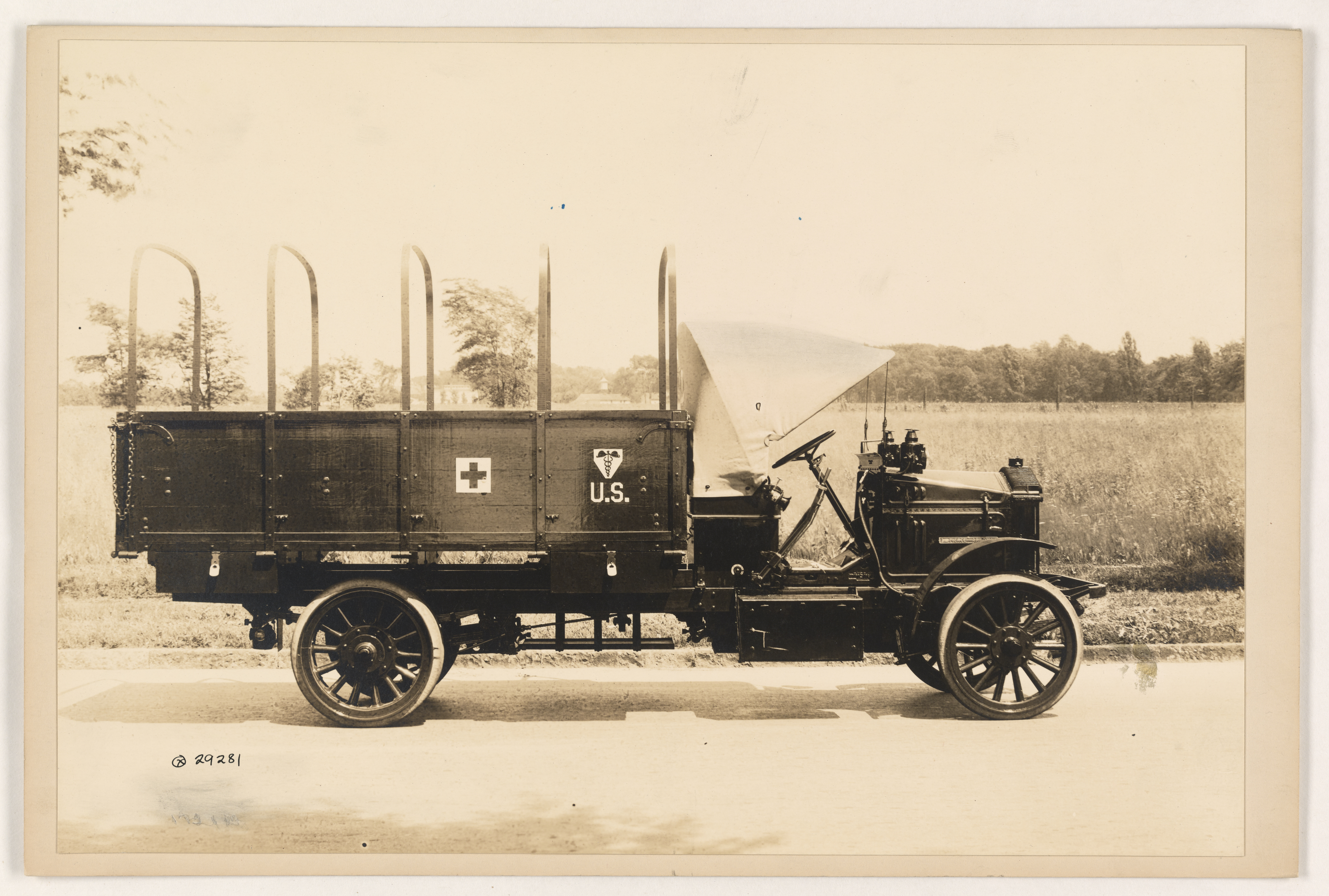
US Army 2-ton Model X

In 1910 Pierce-Arrow was looking to expand their commercial truck business, and on the advice of a young engineer, Francis W. Davis, the company hired two designers from British truck manufacturers. Upon their arrival H. Kerr Thomas formerly of Hallford and John Younger formerly of Dennis, commenced designing a completely new range of trucks, the first of which was the 5-ton Model R which was introduced in 1911. Following this, in 1913 the company introduced a smaller 2-ton model, the Model X.

During the First World War, large numbers of Model Xs were built, between April 1914 and the time of the Armistice in 1918 7,051 Model Xs were produced. The Model X was purchased in large numbers by the French and US militaries for service during the war, the French purchased 2,100 for military service during the conflict.

Production of the Model X continued through the 1920s with few modifications, by 1921 Pierce-Arrow's total truck sales had dropped to 709 vehicles, and in 1922 the company suspended production of the Model X for newer models.

== See also ==
- Pierce-Arrow Model R
