= Pierce-Arrow Model R =

1911 American heavy truck

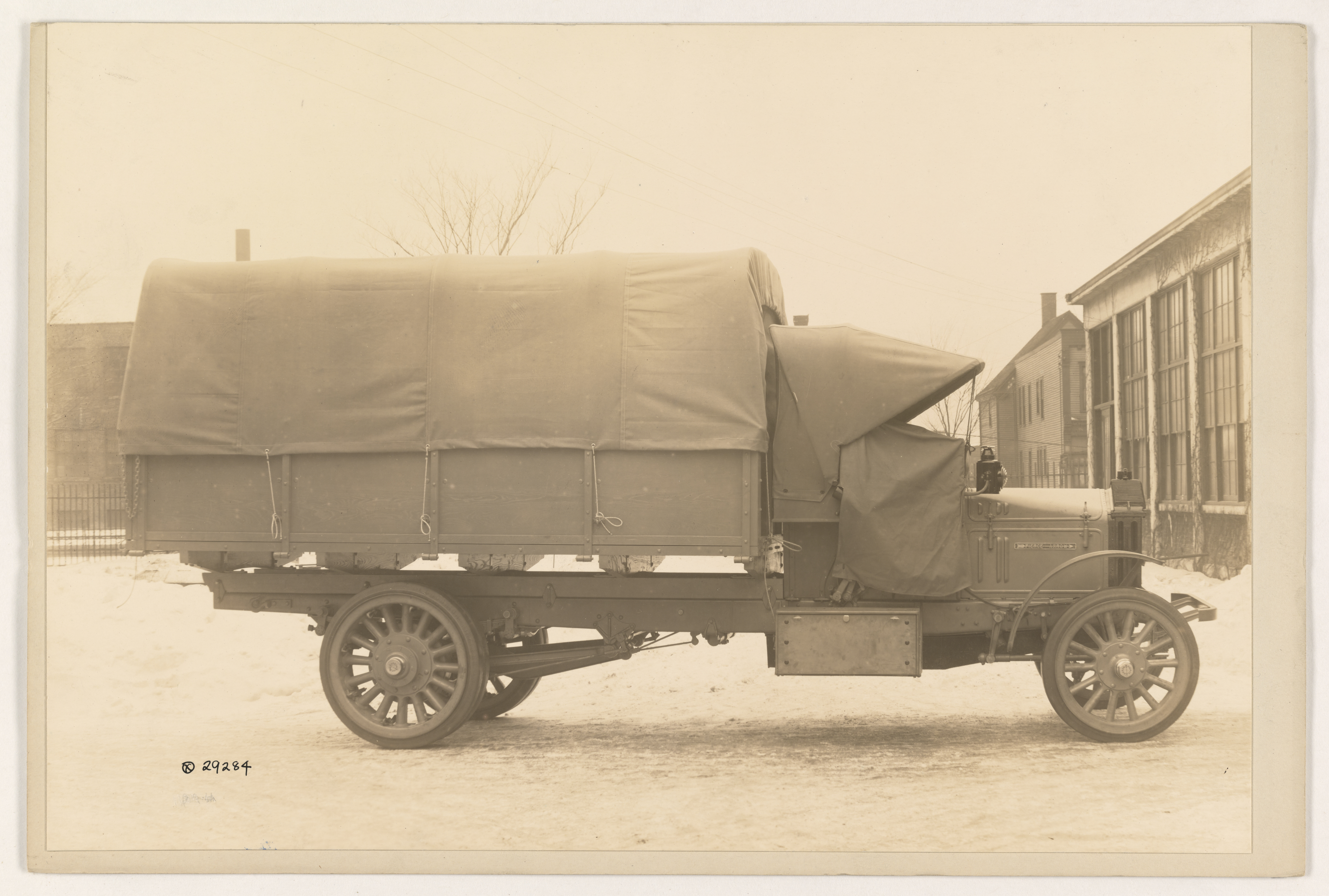
- Pierce-Arrow Model R of the French Army, 1918

Overview
- Manufacturer: Pierce-Arrow Motor Car Company
- Production: 1911–1929
- Designer: H. Kerr Thomas & John Younger

Body and chassis
- Body style: 5-ton truck
- Layout: Cab behind engine

Powertrain
- Engine: 4-cylinder inline 447 cu in (7,319 cc) petrol 38–40 hp (28–30 kW) (Note: S.A.E. or N.A.C.C. horsepower rating.)
- Transmission: 4-speed
- Propulsion: 4x2

Dimensions
- Wheelbase: 13 ft (3.96 m) standard 17 ft (5.18 m) long
- Length: 20 ft (6.10 m) standard 24 ft (7.32 m) long
- Width: 7 ft (2.13 m)

The Pierce-Arrow Model R is a truck model manufactured by the American firm Pierce-Arrow Motor Car Company from 1911 to 1922. Unusually for the period in America, it featured a worm final drive axle.

The Pierce-Arrow Model R was used in very large numbers by the militaries of the British Empire, France and Imperial Russia during the First World War, 11,350 being delivered to the three powers during the war.

== Design ==
The Model R was a cab behind engine, rear-wheel drive truck with a payload capacity of 5 short tons (4.46 long tons; 4.54 t). The Model R was available in two chassis lengths, the standard chassis had a wheelbase of 13 ft (3.96 m) and an overall chassis length of 20 ft (6.10 m), the long chassis had a wheelbase of 17 ft (5.18 m) and an overall chassis length of 24 ft (7.32 m). The bare chassis was 7 ft (2.13 m) in width.

The Model R was powered by a 4-cylinder inline 447 cu in (7,319 cc) 38–40 hp (28–30 kW) T-head petrol engine, dual ignition was introduced with later models, a 25 US gal (21 imp gal; 95 L) fuel tank was standard. The truck was driven through a three-speed transmission and the rear axle featured worm final drive, which was unusual for American trucks of that weight class at the time. It was fitted with a foot actuated transmission brake and hand actuated rear drum brakes.

== History ==
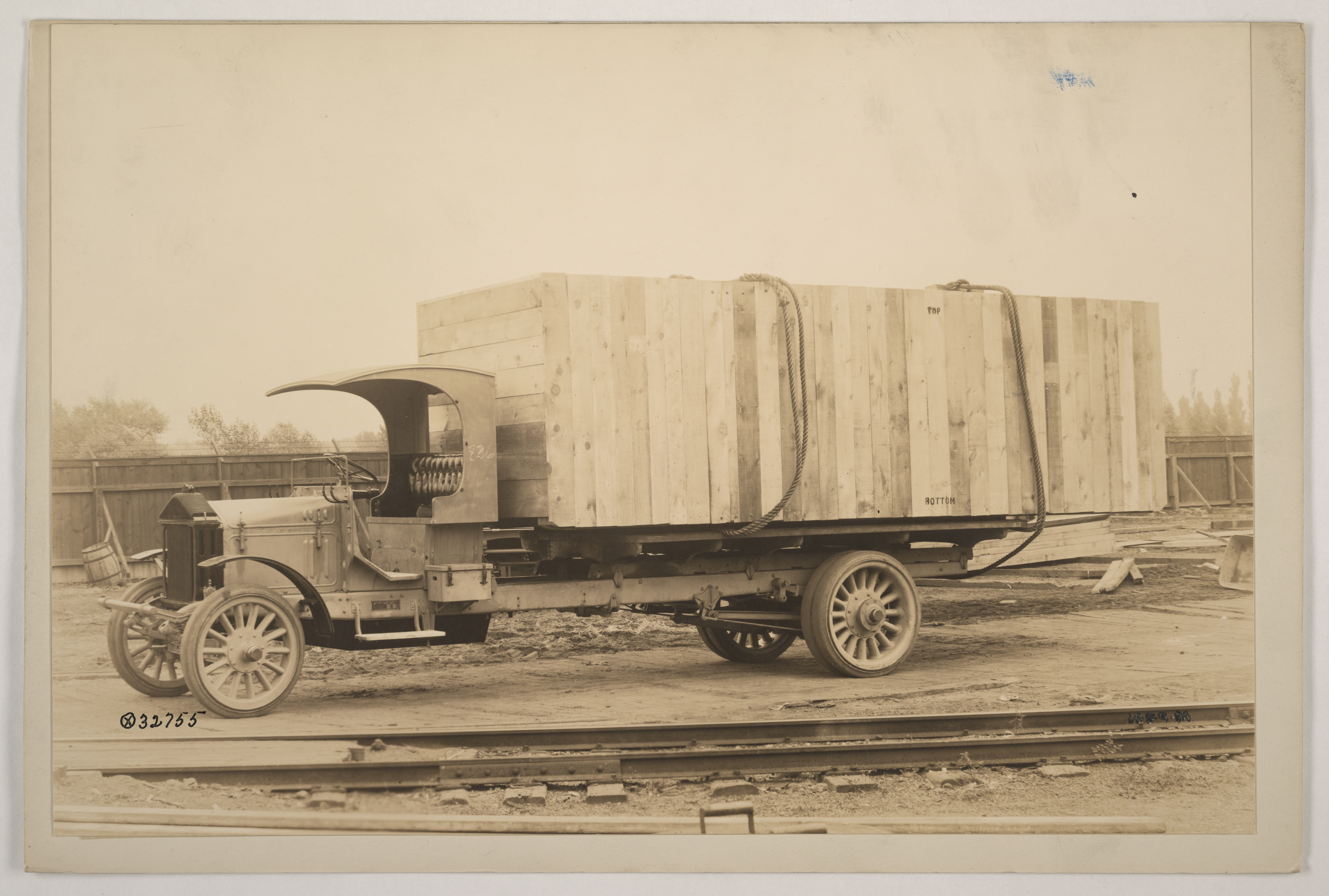
A Pierce-Arrow Model R carrying another Model R that is crated for shipment to the French Army, June 1918

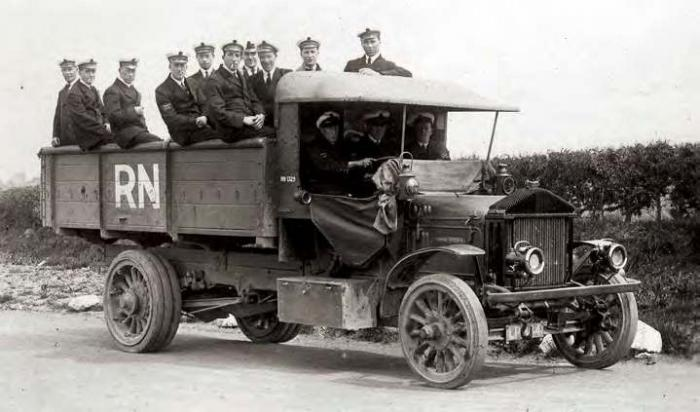
Pierce Arrow Model R used by the RNAS, Anglesey

In 1910 Pierce-Arrow was looking to expand their commercial truck business, and on the advice of a young engineer, Francis W. Davis, the company hired two designers from British truck manufacturers. Upon their arrival H. Kerr Thomas formerly of Hallford and John Younger formerly of Dennis, (Note: Some sources list David Ferguson, formerly of Leyland, as a third designer of the Model R.) commenced designing a completely new range of trucks with payload capacities of 3 1/2 to 5 short tons (3.1 to 4.5 long tons; 3.2 to 4.5 t). The first Model R was completed in May 1911. Between May 1911 and August 1914, Pierce-Arrow had built approximately 800 Model Rs, their advertised price in 1914 was US$4,500.

During the First World War, large numbers of Model Rs were purchased by the militaries of the British Empire, France and Imperial Russia, and by the time of the Armistice in 1918, 11,350 Model Rs had been delivered. The Model R was the most numerous American truck in French military service during the war, with 3,178 purchased by the French during the conflict. In British military service the Model R had a rated payload capacity of 3 long tons (3.4 short tons; 3.0 t) (Note: In First World War British military service, trucks with a civilian payload capacity of 4 to 5 long tons (4.5 to 5.6 short tons; 4.1 to 5.1 t) frequently had a military payload rating of 3 long tons (3.4 short tons; 3.0 t). This was due to a variety of reasons including the rigours of military operations, the propensity for drivers to overload the vehicles, and commercial trucks not needing to account for a crew of three and all of their kit.) and was fitted with a variety of body types. 1,705 Model Rs were in British military service by 1918. The Model R also formed the basis of two British armoured fighting vehicles, the Pierce-Arrow armoured lorry and Pierce-Arrow armoured AA lorry.

Production of the Model R continued through the 1920s with progressive improvements, despite being quite antiquated by that time it had a better reputation than newer Pierce-Arrow models. Production of the Model R finally ceased in 1929, and in 1932 Pierce-Arrow ceased truck production altogether.

Model Rs were still in service with the French Army in 1940, serving during the Battle of France.

== See also ==
- Pierce-Arrow Model X
