= Pierce-Arrow armoured AA lorry =

British anti-aircraft vehicle

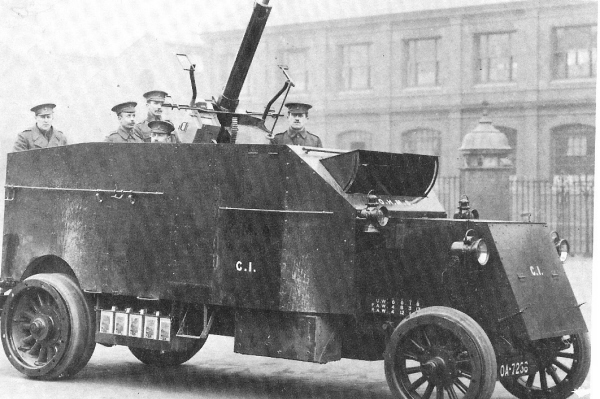
- Type: Anti-aircraft vehicle
- Place of origin: United Kingdom

Service history
- In service: 1915–1918
- Used by: Royal Marine Artillery
- Wars: First World War

Production history
- Manufacturer: Wolseley Motors Ltd; Pierce-Arrow Motor Car Company
- Produced: 1915
- No. built: 48

Specifications
- Mass: 6 long tons (6.1 t) (estimated)
- Length: 17 ft (5.2 m)
- Width: 6 ft 10 in (2.08 m)
- Height: 5 ft 2 in (1.57 m)
- Crew: 5
- Armour: 0.20 or 0.31 in (5 or 8 mm)
- Main armament: 1 x QF 2-pounder (40 mm) AA gun
- Secondary armament: 1 x .303 in (7.7 mm) Vickers machine gun
- Engine: 4-cylinder petrol 30 hp (22 kW)
- Drive: 4x2
- Suspension: Leaf springs

The Pierce-Arrow armoured AA lorry was a self-propelled anti-aircraft carrier mounting a QF 2-pounder AA "pom-pom" gun, it was used by the Royal Marine Artillery during the First World War.

== Design ==
The Pierce-Arrow armoured AA lorry was an open topped armoured lorry based on an imported American Pierce-Arrow Model R 5-ton truck chassis with added armoured bodywork and mounting a QF 2-pounder (40 mm) AA "pom-pom" gun. The Pierce-Arrow had a front mounted engine protected by folding armoured panels, behind the engine was an enclosed driver's compartment with two armoured shutters, whilst the open-topped fighting compartment was at the rear. In addition to the 2-pounder "pom-pom", the vehicle was provided with one or more .303 in (7.7 mm) Vickers machine gun for which four mountings were provided, the fighting compartment included storage for ammunition and other equipment, whilst further ammunition storage was provided on the sides of the vehicle. It is estimated that fully loaded the vehicle weighed around 6 long tons (6.1 t).

The first 32 Pierce-Arrow armoured AA lorries were fitted with 0.20-inch (5 mm) armoured plate, whilst the last 16 were fitted with 0.31-inch (8 mm) armoured plate, the armour was bolted to a frame fitted to the chassis. The 4x2 rear wheel driven chassis had a wheelbase of 14 feet (4.3 m), it had leaf spring suspension and a 4-cylinder petrol engine that delivered 30 horsepower (22 kW).

== History ==
On 30 December 1914 the Admiralty placed an order with Wolseley Motors Ltd for 48 Pierce-Arrow truck chassis to be converted to self-propelled anti-aircraft gun carriers for use by the Royal Marine Artillery Anti-Aircraft Brigade, all 48 were delivered between April and June 1915.

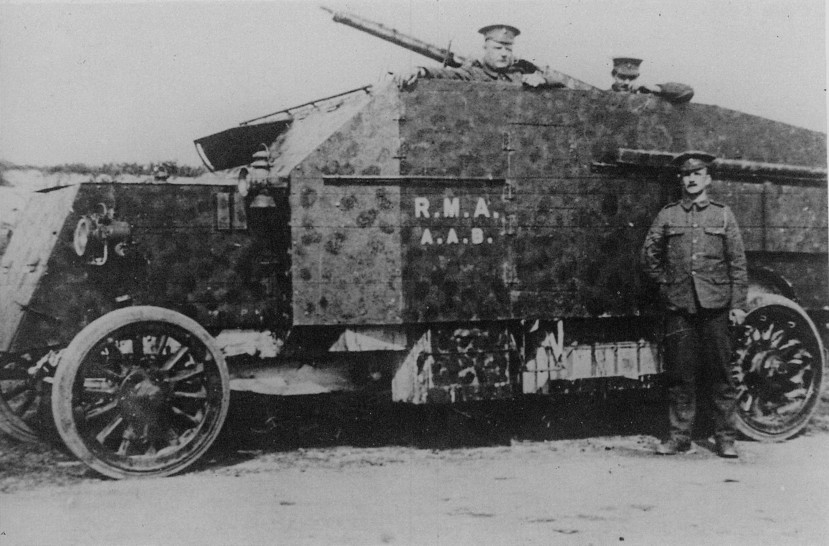

The Royal Marine Artillery Anti-Aircraft Brigade had an establishment of 16 QF 2-pounder "pom-pom" guns which were to be fitted to the vehicles, the remaining vehicles were to be kept as spares, the weapon systems were to be employed in four 4-gun batteries. Due to shortages of 2-pounders only two batteries received the vehicles by the end of April 1915, they were immediately dispatched to France. Arriving at the front on 28 April, their first victory was claimed two days later on 30 April when the first enemy aircraft was shot down. As more 2-pounders became available a third battery was added in August 1915 with the forth and final battery becoming operational in September.

During their period of employment with the Royal Marine Artillery Anti-Aircraft Brigade from April 1915 to the time they were replaced in service by QF 13-pounder 9 cwt guns in 1917, the Pierce-Arrows claimed over twenty German aircraft shot down. The vehicle's contribution was to force enemy reconnaissance aircraft to fly at much greater altitude of up to 10,000 feet (3,000 m) where they were much less effective. The No 1 Squadron, Royal Naval Armoured Car Division under Commander Oliver Locker-Lampson had one Pierce-Arrow during their expedition to Russia and the Caucasus.

== Peerless armoured AA lorry ==
In January and February 1915 the War Office ordered a further 16 armoured AA lorries from Wolseley Ltd for use by the Imperial Russian Army, although these were built on the chassis of an American made Peerless TC4. The Peerless chassis had almost identical dimensions to the Pierce-Arrow so practically the same armour was used, they were, like the Pierce-Arrows, armed with a 2-pounder "pom-pom" and a Vickers machine gun. Delivered to Russia in 1916, the Russians subsequently fitted some with a small turret in place of the 2-pounder.

== See also ==
- List of combat vehicles of World War I
