= Peerless TC4 =

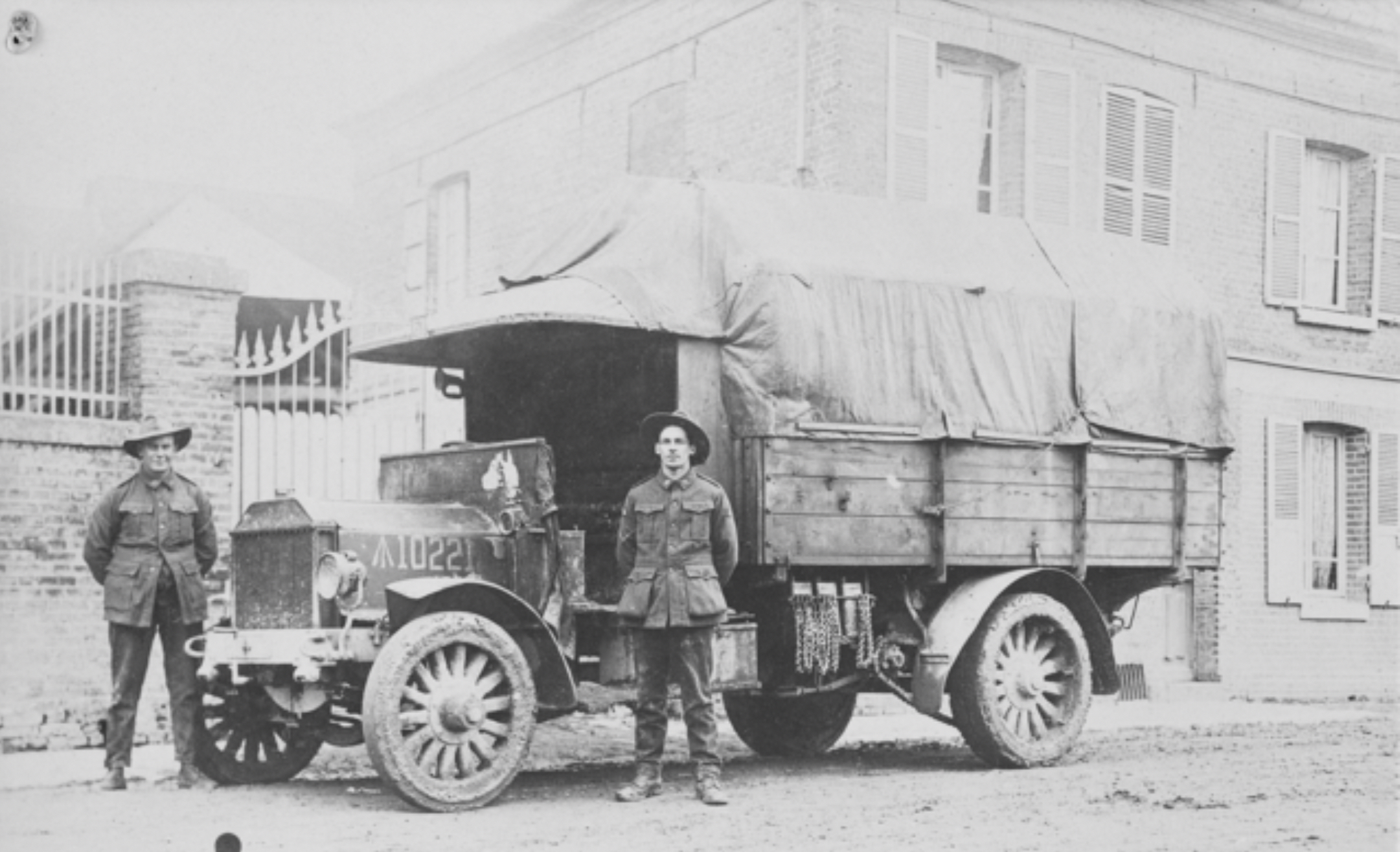
- Two Australian soldiers with a Peerless TC4

Overview
- Manufacturer: Peerless Motor Company
- Production: From 1911

Body and chassis
- Body style: 4-ton truck
- Layout: Cab behind engine

Powertrain
- Engine: Peerless 4-cylinder inline 412 cu in (6.751 L) petrol 40 hp (30 kW)
- Transmission: 4-speed
- Propulsion: 4x2, double chain final drive

Dimensions
- Wheelbase: 12 ft 7 in (3.84 m)

The Peerless TC4 was a truck model manufactured by the American Peerless Motor Company from 1911. It was used in very large numbers by the armies of the British Empire during the First World War, and even continued in service into the early years of the Second World War.

== Design ==
The TC4 was a cab behind engine, rear wheel drive truck, with a payload capacity of 4 short tons (3.6 t; 3.6 long tons). It had a 12 ft 7 in (3.84 m) wheelbase.

The TC4 was powered by a Peerless 4-cylinder inline petrol engine, the cylinders were cast in pairs, each with a bore and stroke of 4 1/2 and 6 1/2 in (110 and 170 mm), equalling 412 cu in (6.751 L) capacity, it developed 40 hp (30 kW). This was driven through a 4-speed transmission to double chain driven rear wheels.

== History ==
The Peerless Motor Company of Cleveland, Ohio, was founded in 1900 and had established a reputation as a manufacturer of luxury cars. In 1911 they released a new range of commercial trucks which included the 4-ton TC4, other trucks in the range were the 2-ton TC2, 3-ton TC3 and 5-ton TC5. All trucks in the range except the 2-ton TC2 had chain final drive, the TC2 having a worm driven rear axle.

=== Military service ===
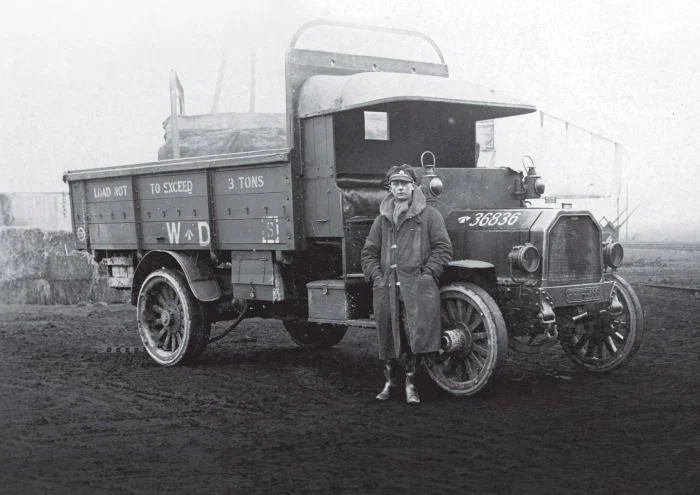
British Peerless GS lorry

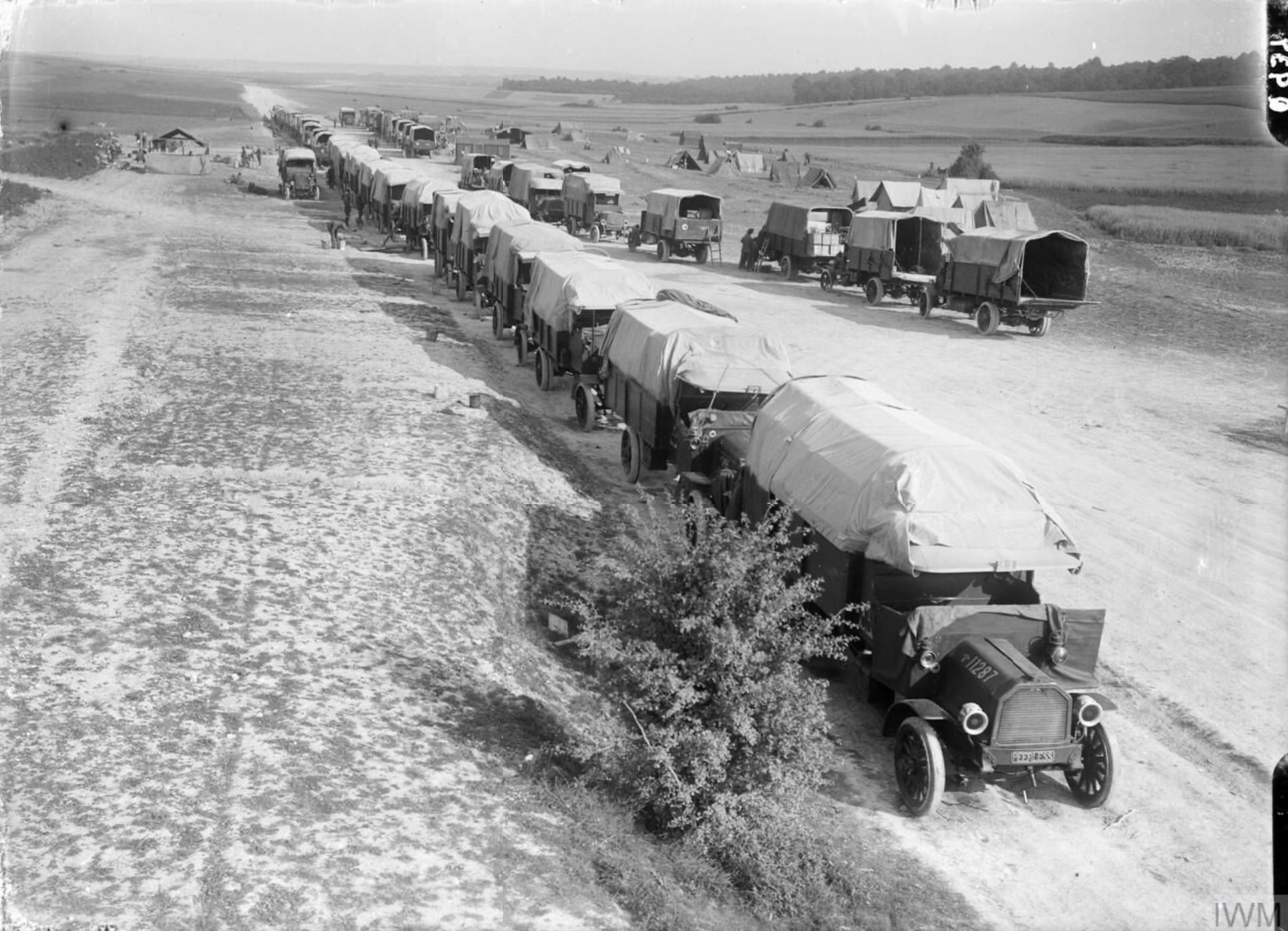
Convoy of British TC4s parked on the roadside near Albert during the Battle of the Somme, July 1916

With the outbreak of the First World War, the British War Office realised British manufacturers would be incapable of producing sufficient motor lorries to meet the needs of the British Empire's militaries. To meet requirements, from as early as September 1914 War Office motor transport inspectors were based in the United States placing orders with various American manufacturers. Orders were placed with a number of manufacturers, but the American lorries best remembered for service with the British during the war were those made by 'The Three Ps', Packard, Peerless and Pierce-Arrow.

The TC4 was the Peerless model selected by the British, although in British military service it was rated at 3 long tons (3.4 short tons; 3.0 t). (Note: In First World War British military service, trucks with a civilian payload capacity of 4 to 5 long tons (4.5 to 5.6 short tons; 4.1 to 5.1 t) frequently had a military payload rating of 3 long tons (3.4 short tons; 3.0 t). This was due to a variety of reasons including the rigours of military operations, the propensity for drivers to overload the vehicles, and commercial trucks not needing to account for a crew of three and all of their kit.) During the war, over 10,000 Peerless TC4s were purchased by the British, making it was the most numerous truck model in British service during the war. It was usually supplied with a bare chassis, with bodies fitted in the United Kingdom. A number of bodies were fitted including GS cargo (the most common variant), troop carrier, workshop, stores, petrol tanker, water tanker and Anti-Aircraft (AA) gun carrier.

During the war the British purchased almost the entire of Peerless production output, one exception was 385 TC4s purchased by the US Army which were sent to France with the American Expeditionary Forces. Upon their arrival in Europe, the British also supplied the Americans with further TC4s from their own stocks.

Some TC4s were retained in British military service after the war, in 1924 a TC4 was modified by Vickers with full length tracks. Named the 'Caterlorry' it weighed 5.6 long tons (5.7 t; 6.3 short tons), had a payload of 3 long tons (3.0 t; 3.4 short tons) and exerted a ground pressure of 11 psi (76 kPa).

The Peerless TC4 chassis was also used as the basis of the Peerless armoured AA lorry, and the Peerless armoured car.

==== AA gun carrier ====
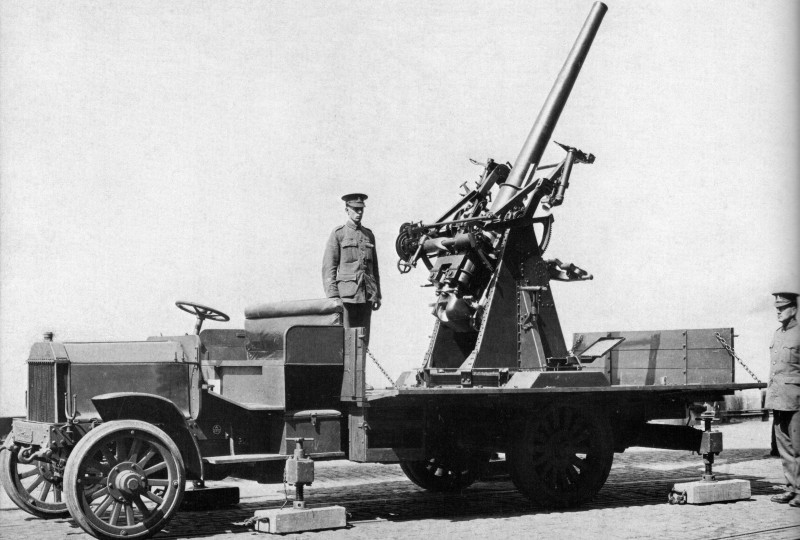
British QF 3 inch 20 cwt anti-aircraft gun mounted on a Peerless lorry

To increase the mobility of AA guns, two truck models were selected by the British as AA gun carriers, the Thornycroft J Type and the Peerless TC4. To fulfil this role some alterations were made to the chassis, including reinforcement with steel plates riveted along the chassis length, folding sides allowed for a larger working area, and four stabilising outriggers added to the underside of the chassis with screw jacks. The gun platform trucks were either fitted with QF 13-pounder 9 cwt, or the more powerful QF 3-inch 20 cwt. When emplaced for firing, the four jacks on the outriggers were lowered, lifting the truck off the ground, and the sides were folded down.

After the war the QF 13-pounder guns were retired from service but the QF 3-inch guns were retained. From 1922 two Territorial Army Air Defence Brigades were charged with the air defence of London, each consisting of six batteries of four Peerless TC4 AA QF 3-inch 20 cwt gun carriers. These forces were briefly mobilised in 1938 during the Munich crisis, and then again with the outbreak of the Second World War, although by this time it recognised the QF 3-inch 20 cwt gun was hopelessly obsolete. As quantities of the towed QF 3.7-inch AA gun became available, the Peerless TC4 gun carriers were retired, a process that was completed in 1940, marking the end of TC4's British military service.

=== Post-war ===
After the war large numbers of surplus British military Peerless TC4s were reconditioned and sold to the British public through Slough Lorries and Components Ltd. As war surplus parts were expended they were replaced by British produced parts, and eventually the company (which was renamed Peerless Trading Company in 1925) were building complete TC4s in small numbers.
