= M1 =

M1, M01 or M-1 may refer to:

== Arts, entertainment and media ==
- M1 (Hungarian TV channel)
- M1 (Russian TV channel)
- M1 (Ukrainian TV channel)
- M-1 (Lithuanian radio station)
- M-1 (rapper), one half of hip hop duo Dead Prez
- Korg M1, a keyboard synthesizer
- Leica M1, a 1959 35 mm camera model
- Olympus OM-1, a 1972 manually operated 35mm single-lens reflex camera

== Economics and finance ==
- M1 (money supply measure), in economics, a measure of the money supply
- M1 Finance, an online financial services company

== Roads, railways, and transit routes ==
=== Railways ===
- Bucharest Metro Line M1, part of the Bucharest Metro, Romania
- Line 1 (Budapest Metro), the first line of Budapest Metro, Hungary
- M-1 Rail Line, now the QLine, streetcar service in Detroit
- M1 (Copenhagen Metro), part of the city's Metro system, Denmark
- M1 (Istanbul Metro), a light railway system in Istanbul, Turkey
- Lausanne Metro Line M1, part of the Lausanne Metro in Switzerland
- M1 (İzmir Metro)
- Milan Metro Line 1
- M1 (Warsaw), the first metro line of the Warsaw Metro
- M1 Metro North West & Bankstown Line, the first metro line of the Sydney Metro

=== Roads ===
- M1 road (Australia), different sections of the A1 highway
  - M1 (New South Wales)
    - Metroad 1, a former road designation in Sydney, Australia
  - M1 (Queensland)
  - M1 (Victoria)
- M-1 (Michigan highway), a road in the US that runs from Detroit northwesterly to Pontiac
- M1 road (Malawi), major road in Malawi
- M1 highway (Belarus), a road connecting the border with Poland and the border with Russia
- M1 highway (Russia), a road connecting Moscow and the border with Belarus
- M1 (East London), a Metropolitan Route in East London, South Africa
- M1 (Johannesburg), a Metropolitan Route in Johannesburg, South Africa
- M1 (Pretoria), a Metropolitan Route in Pretoria, South Africa
- M1 (Durban), a Metropolitan Route in Durban, South Africa
- M1 (Port Elizabeth), a Metropolitan Route in Port Elizabeth, South Africa
- M1 motorway (Hungary), a road connecting Budapest and Győr
- M1 motorway (Northern Ireland), a road connecting Belfast and Dungannon
- M1 motorway (Pakistan), a 155 km (96 mi) road connecting Peshawar and Rawalpindi
- M1 motorway (Republic of Ireland), a road connecting Dublin to the border with Northern Ireland
- M1 motorway, a road in England connecting London and Leeds
- Highway M01 (Ukraine), a road connecting Kyiv and the border with Belarus
- M1 Road (Zambia)

=== Bus routes ===
- Route M-1 (MTA Maryland), a bus route in Baltimore, Maryland and its suburbs
- M1 (New York City bus), a New York City Bus route in Manhattan
- M1 (Brisbane Metro), a bus rapid transit route in Brisbane

== Science and technology ==
=== Biology ===
- Primary motor cortex or M1, a symbol of the primary motor cortex in mammals in neurology
- M1 protein, a matrix protein of the influenza virus
- Muscarinic acetylcholine receptor M1, a receptor in the human autonomic nervous system
- British NVC community M1, Sphagnum auriculatum bog pool community
- 20-O-beta-D-glucopyranosyl-20(S)-protopanaxadiol, a ppd-type monoglucoside ginsenoside metabolized by intestinal bacteria
- M1 macrophage, a phenotype of macrophage

=== Computing ===
- Cyrix 6x86 processor (codename M1)
- M1-DA, M1, or VESA Plug and Display connector
- A part number for a 1N400x general-purpose diode
- Apple M1 system on a chip

=== Medicine ===
- Slang name for methylone
- ATC code M01 Anti-inflammatory and antirheumatic products, a subgroup of the Anatomical Therapeutic Chemical Classification System

=== Other uses in science and technology ===
- Crab Nebula, also known as Messier object M1
- Korg M1, a keyboard synthesizer
- Leica M1, a 1959 35 mm camera model
- Olympus OM-1, a 1972 manually operated 35mm single-lens reflex camera

== Vehicles ==
=== Air and space ===
- Bristol M.1, a 1916 British fighter aircraft
- Hakuto-R Mission 1, private Japanese lunar landing mission
- M-1 (rocket engine), the largest liquid Hydrogen and LOx rocket engine ever designed
- Martin M-1, glider
- Matteson M-1, glider
- Miles M.1 Satyr, a 1930s British single-seat aerobatic biplane
- Moreland M-1, a 1929 American three-seat civil aircraft
- Verville-Sperry M-1 Messenger, 1922

=== Locomotives and rolling stock ===
- Chesapeake and Ohio class M-1, a steam-turbine locomotive
- LNER Class M1, a class of British steam locomotives
- M1 (Paris Metro), the first rolling stock on the Paris Metro in 1900
- M1/M3 (railcar), a series of electric multiple unit cars on the Long Island Rail Road and Metro-North Railroad
- Metro M1 (Prague), metro kit M1, used on line C of the Prague Metro
- PRR M1, a class of steam locomotive
- M series (Toronto subway), former rolling stock of the Toronto subway
- Sri Lanka Railways M1, diesel-electric locomotives

=== Military land vehicles ===
- M1 Abrams, a main battle tank
- M1 armored car
- M1 combat car, an early tank
- M1 light tractor
- M1 medium tractor
- M1 heavy tractor

=== Road vehicles ===
- BMW M1, a German mid-engined sports car
- Great Wall Haval M1, a Chinese subcompact crossover
- Minardi M01, an Italian 1999 Formula One racing car
- Riich M1, a Chinese city car
- M1 category vehicle, a classification of passenger vehicles under the United Nations Economic Commission for Europe
- Yamaha YZR-M1, a Japanese motorcycle

=== Ships ===
- HMS Abercrombie (1915) (M1), a WWI Royal Navy monitor
- HMS M1 (1917) (1919), an early British submarine
- HSwMS M1, a Swedish Navy mine sweeper
- HSwMS Älvsnabben (M01), a Swedish Royal Navy mine layer

== Weapons ==
=== US Armed Forces ===
- 120 mm gun M1, an anti-aircraft gun
- 155 mm gun M1, a field artillery gun
- 20 mm aircraft gun M1 or French Hispano-Suiza HS.404
- 240 mm howitzer M1, WWII
- 37 mm gun M1, anti-aircraft
- 40 mm automatic gun M1 or Swedish Bofors 40 mm Automatic Gun L/60
- 57 mm gun M1, or British Ordnance QF 6-pounder
- 76 mm gun M1, WWII
- 8-inch gun M1, or M115 howitzer
- 90 mm gun M1, dual-purpose gun
- M1 bayonet
- M1 carbine, WWII
- M1 chemical mine, WWII
- M1 flamethrower, WWII
- M1 frangible grenade, WWII
- M1 Garand, WWII rifle
- M1 mortar
- M1 rocket launcher "bazooka", WWII rocket launcher
- M1 Thompson submachine gun
- M1 underwater defense gun, or Underwater Defense Gun Mark 1 Mod 0

=== Other weapons ===
- 35.5 cm Haubitze M1, a German WWII howitzer
- Benelli M1, a semi-automatic shotgun
- Guncrafter Industries M1 or Model No. 1, a handgun
- M1 (missile), French
- M1 mine

== Other uses ==
- M-1 Global or M-1 Mixfight, a mixed martial arts sports organization
- M1 helmet, a military helmet
- M-1 visa, a vocational training student visa for the US
- M1 (Singaporean company), a telecommunications company in Singapore
- M1 World Championship, the first esports world championship for the mobile game Mobile Legends: Bang Bang held in 2019
- M1, a difficulty grade in mixed climbing
- M1 Support Services, an American defense contractor

== See also ==
- Model 1 (disambiguation)
- 1M (disambiguation)
- ML (disambiguation)
- MI (disambiguation)
