= IM =

IM or Im may refer to:

== Arts and entertainment ==
- I.M, South Korean rapper and singer; member of boy band Monsta X
- "I.M" (song), a song by Israeli singer Michael Ben David
- Infected Mushroom, an Israeli psytrance and electronica duo
- Iron Maiden, a British heavy metal band
- Iron Man, a comic book superhero

== Businesses ==
- IM Global, an American film and TV company
- Immediate Music, a music composition company
- Menajet (IATA: IM), a Lebanese airline
- IM Motors, Chinese NEV brand of SAIC Motor

== Military and government ==
- Indian Mujahideen, an India-based militant Islamist group
- Inoffizieller Mitarbeiter, an informant for the Stasi of East Germany

== Mythology ==
- Im (jötunn), a giant in Norse mythology
- IM, a cuneiform sign used as a logogram to represent names of weather gods, including Mesopotamian Ishkur/Adad, Hurrian Teshub and Hittite Tarhunna

== Names ==
- Im (Korean surname)
- Yan (surname) (Cantonese romanization: Im), a surname

== Places ==
- IM postcode area, for the Isle of Man
- Isle of Man (FIPS country code)

== Science and technology ==
=== Biology and medicine ===
- Infectious mononucleosis, a disease
- Internal medicine, a medical speciality
- IM injection, or intramuscular injection
- Imipramine, by the trade name IM
- Intermediate metabolizer, an individual with reduced metabolic activity

=== Computing ===
- .im, an Internet country code for the Isle of Man
- Information management
- Input method, a component that allows users to enter an expanded set of characters and symbols
- Instant messaging, a form of real-time communication online using typed text

=== Other uses in science and technology ===
- Im function in mathematics, where Im(z) denotes the imaginary part of a complex number z
- Intermodulation, the amplitude modulation of signals containing two or more different frequencies
- Induction motor
- Im, a subtype of irregular galaxy

== Sports ==
- Individual medley, a type of swimming race
- International Master, a title in chess
- Intramural sports
- Inter Milan, an Italian football club

== Other ==
- Independent Methodist (disambiguation)
- Scion iM, a Japanese-American compact car

== See also ==
- I Am (disambiguation) including uses of "I'm"
- LM (disambiguation)
- 1M (disambiguation)
