= Whatsit =

Whatsit may refer to:

- Whatsit, a placeholder word
- Waterman Whatsit, an aeroplane designed by Waldo Waterman
- Mrs. Whatsit, a character in A Wrinkle in Time by Madeleine L'Engle
- Wotsits, cheese puffs produced by Walkers, a British snack food manufacturer
- The WHATSIT database program
- Martin M-1 Whatsit, glider
