= M&L =

M&L may refer to:

- Manchester and Lawrence Railroad, a former railroad company New Hampshire, United States
- Manchester and Leeds Railway, a former British railway company
- Mario & Luigi, a series of role-playing video games

== See also ==
- M & L Samuel, a former name of Canadian metalworking company Samuel, Son & Co.
- ML (disambiguation)
- MNL (disambiguation)
- L&M, an American brand of cigarettes
