= Model 1 =

Model 1 may refer to:

- Austin Model 1, a semi-empirical method for the quantum calculation of molecular electronic structure in computational chemistry
- Boeing Model 1, a United States single-engine biplane seaplane aircraft
- Breese-Dallas Model 1, a prototype single engine airliner that rapidly changed hands throughout the 1930s
- Fleet Model 1, a biplane from 1928
- JSP model 1 architecture, a design pattern used in the design of Java Web applications
- Sega Model 1, an arcade system board released by Sega in 1992
- Smith & Wesson Model 1, an American revolver produced from 1857 through 1882

== See also ==
- M1 (disambiguation)
- System 1 (disambiguation)
- Type 1 (disambiguation)
