= MI =

MI or variants may refer to:

== Arts and entertainment ==
=== Film and television ===
- Mi (film), a 2018 Burmese film
- Mission: Impossible (disambiguation), multiple uses of "M.I."
  - Mission: Impossible (1966 TV series), the first American television series
  - Mission: Impossible (film), a movie based on the television series
- Monsters, Inc., a Pixar media franchise and an energy supply factory company in Monstropolis

=== Music ===
- Mi, the third note of the scale in solfege
- Mi (band), a Croatian and Yugoslav rock band
- Mi (Flower Flower album), the 2014 debut album by Flower Flower
- Mi (Super Junior-M album), a 2008 album, also called Me
- Mi (Faye Wong album), a 1994 album
- Mi (Dino Merlin album), a 2025 album
- M.I Abaga (acronym of Mr. Incredible), a Nigerian rapper and musician
- Mi Pasion, an album by Gospel Christian singer Ericson Alexander Molano
- Sammi Cheng, Hong Kong Queen of Pop
- Masked Intruder, an American pop punk band
- M.I., an album by Masked Intruder

=== Other media ===
- Maison Ikkoku, a Japanese manga written by Rumiko Takahashi
- Media Indonesia, a newspaper in Jakarta, Indonesia
- Monkey Island series, a series of computer adventure games by LucasArts

== Businesses and organizations ==
=== Businesses and brands ===
- M&I Bank, formerly a U.S. bank, now part Bank of Montreal
- Measurement Incorporated, an educational testing company based in North Carolina
- Mi, a brand of the electronics company Xiaomi
- Mil Moscow Helicopter Plant, a Russian design bureau
- SilkAir (IATA airline designator)

=== Other organizations ===
- Marching Illini, the marching band at the University of Illinois
- Mechanics Institute
- Micronutrient Initiative, an international not-for-profit agency based in Canada
- Militia Immaculata, a worldwide evangelist movement
- Millennia Institute, a pre-university institution in Singapore
- Mood Indigo (culfest), an annual cultural festival of IIT Bombay
- Mountaineering Ireland, the national representative body for hikers and climbers in Ireland
- Musician's Institute, an institution for higher education in California in the US
- Ordo Clericorum Regularium Ministrantium Infirmis, the Camillians, a Catholic religious order

== Food ==
- Mì, Vietnamese yellow wheat (or egg) noodles and noodle soup
- Mi goreng, a fried noodle dish common in Indonesia

== Language ==
- M, a letter in the Latin alphabet
- Mu (letter), a letter in the Greek alphabet
- Mi (cuneiform), a sign in cuneiform writing
- Mi (kana), the romanization of the Japanese kana み and ミ
- Māori language, ISO 639-1 code:mi

== Military ==
- Military intelligence, or milint, a military service that uses intelligence gathering disciplines to collect information that informs commanders for decision-making processes
  - MI5, MI6, MI7, MI8, or MI9, the UK military intelligence sections
- Operation MI, a Japanese military operation of World War II

== Places ==
- Michalovce District, Slovakia (vehicle plate code MI)
- Michigan, state abbreviation in the US
- Metropolitan City of Milan, previously the Province of Milan, Italy (vehicle plate code MI)
- Minden-Lübbecke, Germany (vehicle plate code MI)
- The Mission Inn Hotel & Spa, an historic hotel in Riverside, California, US
- Mistelbach District, Austria (vehicle plate code MI)
- Phthiotis, Greece (vehicle plate code MI)

== Science, technology, and mathematics ==
=== Biology, medicine, and psychology ===
- Mechanical Index, an ultrasound metric used to estimate the possibility of bioeffects
- Mental illness, or mental disorder
- Methylisothiazolinone, or MIT, an ingredient found in personal care products, sometimes erroneously called methylisothiazoline, used as a biocide and preservative
- Motivational Interviewing, a therapeutic approach employed in clinical psychology and cognitive behavioural therapy, especially in substance abuse work
- Multiple Intelligence, the theory that argues that intelligence, particularly as it is traditionally defined, does not sufficiently encompass the wide variety of abilities humans display
- Myocardial infarction, the technical term for a heart attack

=== Computing and telecommunications ===
- Machine Interface, a hardware abstraction used in the IBM System/38's architecture
- Management information
- Mechanistic interpretability, a subfield of explainable AI
- Mi (prefix symbol), the IEEE prefix symbol for mebi, that represents 2^{20}
- Mobile Internet, a browser-based access to the Internet or web applications using a mobile device connected to a wireless network
- Multiple inheritance, a feature of some object-oriented programming languages in which a class can inherit behaviors and features from more than one superclass

=== Mathematics ===
- Mathematical induction
- Mutual information, a measure of mutual dependence of two random variables in probability and information theory

=== Other uses in science and technology ===
- Malleable iron, a type of cast iron
- Melt Flow Index, a characteristic property of a thermoplastic polymer as a means of quality control
- Mile, a measure of distance in the Imperial system, about 1.6 km
- Mineral-insulated copper-clad cable, a type of electrical cable
- Moment of inertia, a measure of an object's resistance to changes in its rotation rate
- MI, or M_{i}, magnitude-intensity relation, or magnitude intensity scale, used to assess the magnitude of historic earthquakes that occurred prior to the development of seismographs in the late 19th century; see Mercalli intensity scale
- Multi Interface Shoe, a camera hotshoe introduced by Sony in 2012
- Machine intelligence, another name for Artificial intelligence

== Sports ==
- Mumbai Indians, an Indian Premier League team
  - Mumbai Indians (WPL), an Indian Women's Premier League team
- MI New York, a Major League Cricket team
- MI Cape Town, a South African cricket team

== Other uses ==
- 1001 (number), in Roman numerals
- Mi (surname), various Chinese people
- Market intelligence, information relevant to a company's markets used to support decision-making
- Middle initial, in human names
- Monumental Inscription
- Mortgage insurance, or mortgage guaranty, an insurance policy which compensates lenders or investors for losses due to the default of a mortgage loan
- Milton line (MI), of the GO Transit rail network in Ontario, Canada

== See also ==
- MII (disambiguation)
- ML (disambiguation)
- M1 (disambiguation)
- Mia (given name)
- Mimi and Mi, a Japanese morpheme associated with rulers
