= JSP model 2 architecture =

A simplified diagram of the Model 2 pattern.

JSP Model 2 is a design pattern used in the design of Java Web applications which separates the display of content from the logic used to obtain and manipulate the content. Since Model 2 drives a separation between logic and display, it is usually associated with the model–view–controller (MVC) paradigm. While the exact form of the MVC "Model" was never specified by the Model 2 design, a number of publications recommend a formalized layer to contain MVC Model code. The Java BluePrints, for example, originally recommended using EJBs to encapsulate the MVC Model.

In a Model 2 application, requests from the client browser are passed to the controller. The controller performs any logic necessary to obtain the correct content for display. It then places the content in the request (commonly in the form of a JavaBean or POJO) and decides which view it will pass the request to. The view then renders the content passed by the controller.

Model 2 is recommended for medium- and large-sized applications.

== History ==
In 1998, Sun Microsystems published a pre-release of the JavaServer Pages specification, version 0.92. In this specification, Sun laid out two methods by which JSP pages could be used. The first model (referred to as "model 1" due to its ordering in the document) was a simplistic model whereby JSP pages were standalone, disjointed entities. Logic could be contained within the page itself, and navigation between pages was typically achieved by way of hyperlinks. This fit with the then-common usage of template technology.

ColdFusion and Active Server Pages are examples of contemporary technologies that also implemented this model.

The second model referred to by the document ("model 2" in the ordering) was an improved method that combined servlet technology with JSP technology. The specific difference listed was that a servlet would intercept the request, place the content to render into a request attribute (typically represented by a JavaBean), then call a JSP to render the content in the desired output format. This model differed from the previous model in the fact that JSP technology was used as a pure template engine. All of the logic was separated out into a servlet, leaving the JSP with the sole responsibility of rendering the output for the content provided.

In December 1999, JavaWorld published an article by Govind Seshadri entitled Understanding JavaServer Pages Model 2 architecture. In this article, Govind accomplished two major milestones in the use of the term "Model 2". The first milestone was to formalize the term "Model 2" as an architectural pattern rather than one of two possible options. The second milestone was the claim that Model 2 provided an MVC architecture for web-based software.

Govind believed that because "Model 2" architecture separated the logic out of the JSP and placed it in a servlet, the two pieces could be seen as the "View" and the "Controller" (respectively) in an MVC architecture. The "Model" part of the MVC architecture was left open by Govind, with a suggestion that nearly any data-structure could meet the requirements. The specific example used in the article was a Vector list stored in the user's session.

In March 2000, the Apache Struts project was released. This project formalized the division between View and Controller and claimed implementation of the "Model 2" pattern. Once again, the implementation of the "Model" was left undefined with the expectation that software developers would fill in an appropriate solution. Database interaction via JDBC and EJBs were options suggested on the Struts homepage. More recently, Hibernate, iBatis, and Object Relational Bridge were listed as more modern options that could be used for a model.

Since the release of Struts, a number of competing frameworks have appeared. Many of these frameworks also claim to implement "Model 2" and "MVC". In result, the two terms have become synonymous in the minds of developers. This has led to the use of the term "MVC Model 2" or "MVC2" for short.

== Misconceptions ==
A common misconception is that a formalized MVC pattern is required to achieve a Model 2 implementation. However, the Java BluePrints specifically warn against this interpretation:

The literature on Web-tier technology in the J2EE platform frequently uses the terms "Model 1" and "Model 2" without explanation. This terminology stems from early drafts of the JSP specification, which described two basic usage patterns for JSP pages. While the terms have disappeared from the specification document, they remain in common use. Model 1 and Model 2 simply refer to the absence or presence (respectively) of a controller servlet that dispatches requests from the client tier and selects views.

Furthermore, the term "MVC2" has led many to a mistaken belief that Model 2 represents a next-generation MVC pattern. In fact, MVC2 is simply a shortening of the term "MVC Model 2".

The confusion over the term "MVC2" has led to additional confusion over Model 1 code, resulting in common usage of the nonexistent term "MVC1".

== See also ==
- Apache Struts is an open-source framework for implementing web-applications based on a Model 2 architecture.
