= Mission: Incredible =

Mission: Incredible or Mission Incredible may refer to:

- Mission: Incredible (The Jeffersons), 1983
- Mission: Incredible (The Incredible Hulk), 1997
- Mission Incredible: Adventures on the Dragon's Trail, 2012 film

== See also ==
- Mission: Impossible (disambiguation)
