= U-30 tow tractor =

The U-30 tow tractor is an aircraft towing vehicle used by the United States and Allied Air Force. There are several models of the U-30 tractor, with weight characteristics from 70,000–120,000 lb (32,000–54,000 kg).

The first generation was designed and delivered in 1968 to the Air Force by the Oshkosh Truck Corporation. The vehicle was required for the then-new Lockheed C-5 Galaxy aircraft, the largest in the USAF's inventory. Oshkosh delivered a total of 45 vehicles under that contract. Since then, several manufacturers have produced the U-30 vehicle, to include Stewart & Stevenson and FMC Technologies (now JBT AeroTech). The Air Force also purchases remanufactured U-30 tow tractors. Melton Sales and Service of Bordentown, New Jersey currently has this contract in which three variants of the U-30 tow tractor are overhauled.

== See also ==
- MB-2 tow tractor
- M2 high-speed tractor
- Omni Directional Vehicle
