= Ed Heinemann =

American aircraft designer

Edward Henry Heinemann
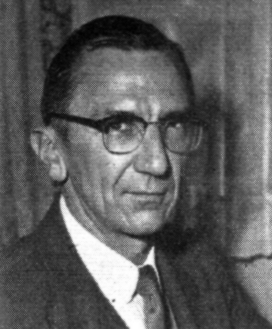
- Born: March 14, 1908; Saginaw, Michigan
- Died: November 26, 1991 (aged 83)
- Occupation: Aeronautical engineer

Edward Henry Heinemann (March 14, 1908 – November 26, 1991) was an American military aircraft designer for the Douglas Aircraft Company.

== Biography ==
Heinemann was born in Saginaw, Michigan. He moved to California as a boy and was raised in Los Angeles. A self-taught engineer, he joined Douglas Aircraft as a draftsman in 1926, but was laid off within a year. After stints at International Aircraft, Moreland Aircraft, and the first Northrop Corporation, Heinemann rejoined Douglas after it acquired Northrop. Heinemann became Douglas' chief engineer in 1936. He remained with the company through 1960, when he left to join Guidance Technology. In 1962, he joined General Dynamics as corporate vice president of engineering. In this position, he oversaw the development of the F-16. He retired in 1973.

The airplane designer Burt Rutan listed Heinemann as among the leading pioneers in aviation who had inspired him to become an aerospace engineer.

His approach to aircraft design was uncomplicated, once saying that he simply took the most powerful engine available and designed the aircraft around it.

== Designs ==
During his long career at Douglas, Heinemann designed more than 20 combat aircraft, primarily for the U.S. Navy, including many that became legends in aviation history. His designs included:

- Douglas SBD Dauntless dive bomber
- Douglas BTD Destroyer dive/torpedo bomber
- Douglas XTB2D Skypirate torpedo bomber
- A-20 Havoc light bomber/attack aircraft
- A-26 Invader light bomber/attack aircraft
- A-1 Skyraider attack aircraft
- A-3 Skywarrior bomber
- A-4 Skyhawk light bomber
- F3D Skyknight night fighter
- F4D Skyray carrier-based fighter aircraft
- Douglas Skystreak and Douglas Skyrocket research aircraft

One of the first aircraft to be designed by Heinemann was the Moreland M-1 trainer of 1929, a braced-wing, parasol wing monoplane. Due to the 1929 recession, only a small number were sold before the company ceased trading in 1933.

== Awards and medals ==
- 1953: Collier Trophy (for the F4D Skyray)
- 1978: Guggenheim Medal
- 1981: National Aviation Hall of Fame
- 1982: International Air & Space Hall of Fame
- 1983: National Medal of Science

The Naval Air Systems Command awards the Edward H. Heinemann Award annually to an individual or group that makes a significant contribution to aircraft design.
