= M1 light tractor =

Prior to and during World War II the United States Army called several tractors M1 light tractor. Under the Ordnance Corps these commercial off-the-shelf tractors were meant to tow artillery pieces so were not equipped with blades like their Engineer counterparts. Eventually these were replaced by purpose-built high-speed tractors (HSTs). Some tractors were equipped with crane attachments for ammunition, and material handling.

== Variants ==
- G015 M1 light ordnance tractor
- G036 light tractor, 3.5-ton, Cletrac 20c
- Light tractor Caterpillar R-4
- G151 light tractor Caterpillar D-4 (not yet known for sure if it was called M1)
- G099 light tractor IH TD-9 (called M1?)

== Gallery ==
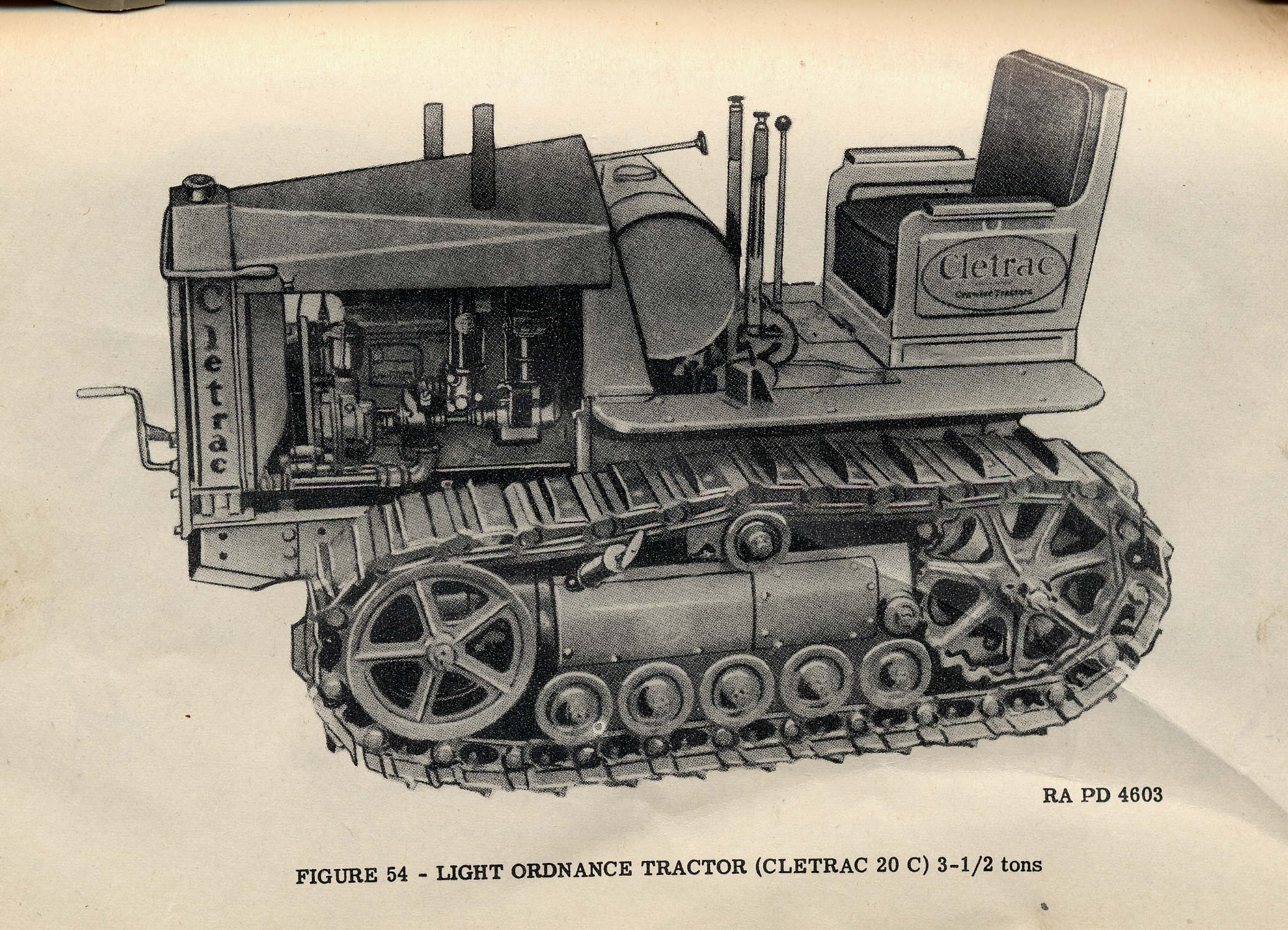
G36 Light tractor Cletrac model 20c

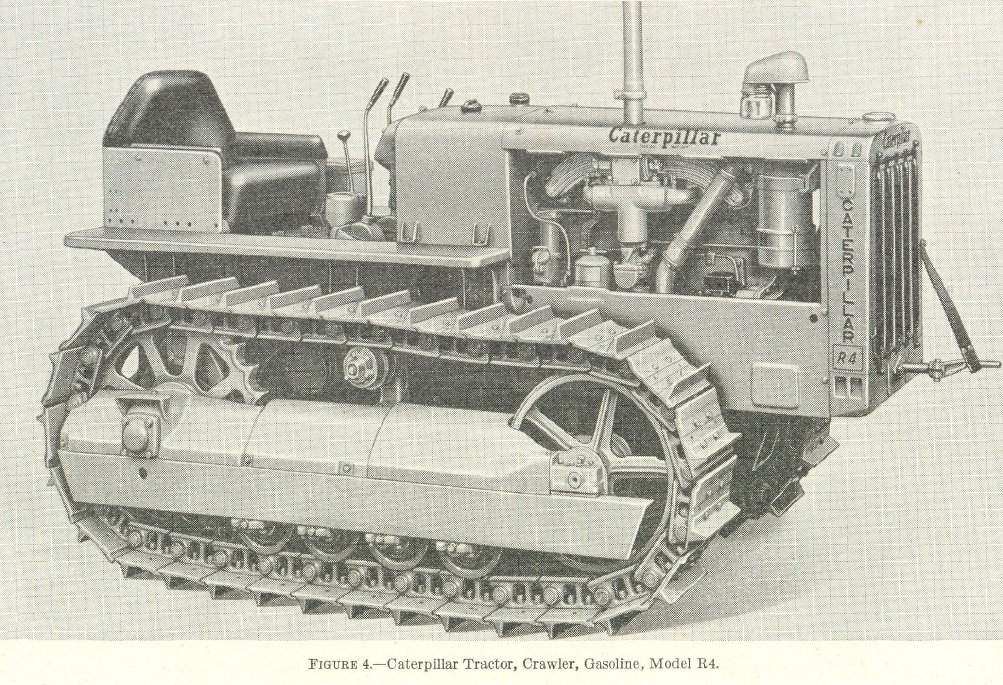
Caterpillar tractor, crawler, gasoline, model R4 from TB 5-9720-11, 1944

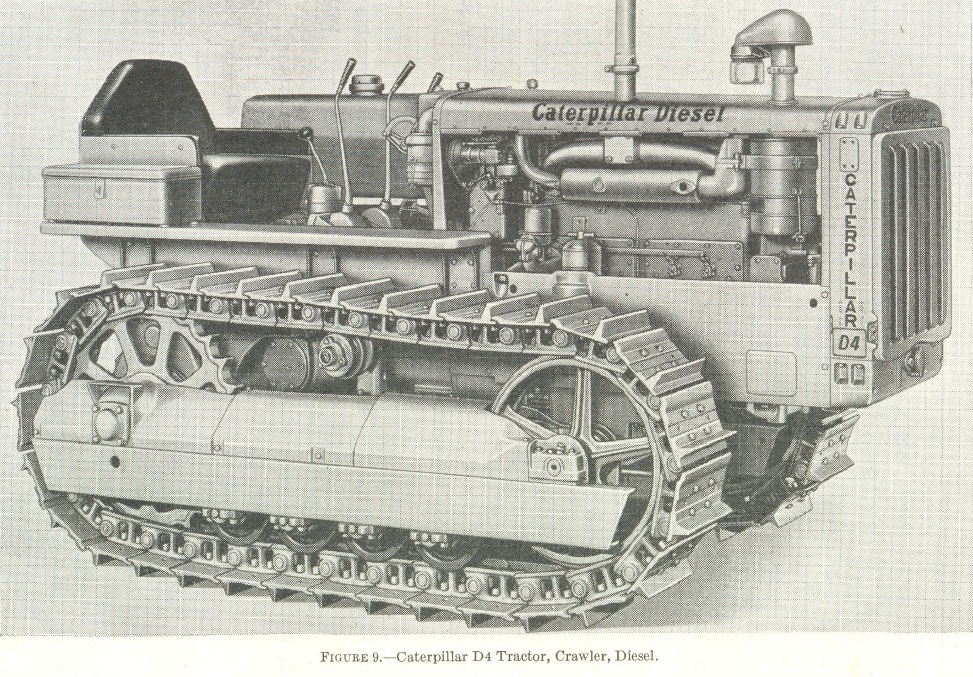
Right view of Caterpillar D4 tractor, crawler, diesel

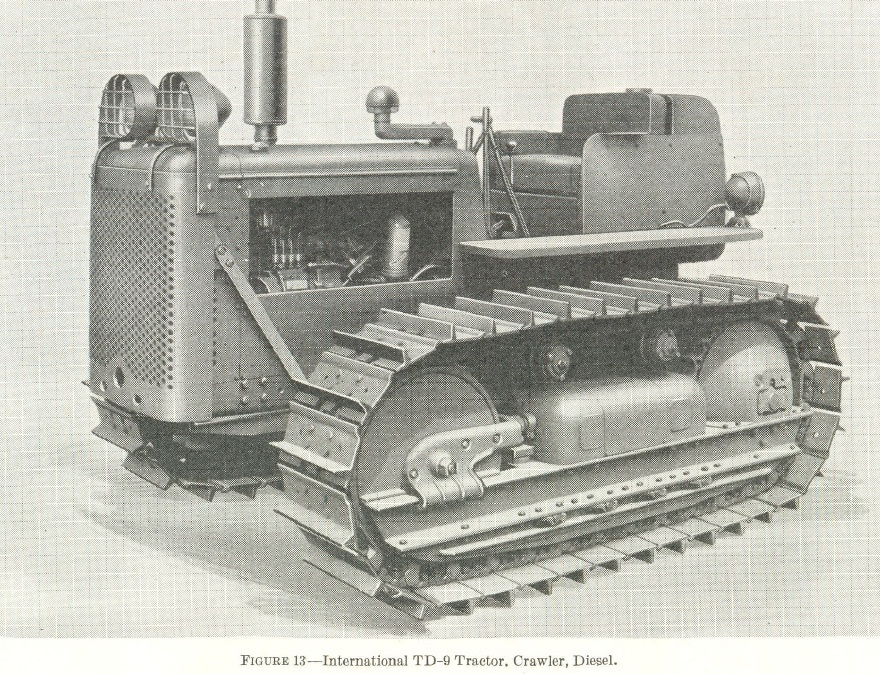
International TD-9 tractor, crawler, diesel from TB 5-9720-11, 1944

== Detailed information on Caterpillar D4 ==
TB 5-9720-11 (1944) gives the following detailed information:

TRACTOR, CRAWLER, DIESEL, 35 TO 40-DBHP, STANDARD, CATERPILLAR, D4

Manufacturer: Caterpillar Tractor Co. Stock No.: 78-8138.0-44 Peoria, Illinois Model: D4

1. General. — The D4 is designed for towing and all types of general construction work. Accurately located frame-holes are provided for attaching varied tractor equipment to adapt it for use in earth moving, road clearance, and airport construction work.

2. References. — For further information regarding this equipment, refer to: TM 5-3110; ASF Catalog, Section ENG 7-T31, ENG 8-T31.

3. Engine. — Make: Caterpillar. Model: D4. Fuel: Diesel commercial. Cylinders: 4. Bore and Stroke: 4}£ x 5K-in. Governed speed: 1400 rpm. Valve adjustment: 0.010-in. Firing order: 1-3-4-2. Equipped with Independent, 2-cylinder, 4-stroke-cycle gasoline starting engine.

4. Fuel, coolant, and lubrication data. — Fuel tank: 25-gal fuel oil. Radiator: 11 -gal water. Crankcase: 4-gal engine oil. Transmission: 5-gal gear oil. Final drive cases: 1%-gal gear oil each. Engine oil grade: OE-30 above 32 F, OE-10 below 32 °F. Gear oil grade: GO-90 above 32 F, GO-80 below 32 °F.

5. Speeds and drawbar pull. — Five forward speeds and one reverse. Reverse speed: 1.9 mph. Forward speeds with maximum drawbar pull are: 1st: 1.7 mph, 7852 lb. 2nd: 2.4 mph, 5811 lb. 3rd: 3.0 mph, 4541 lb. 4th: 3.7 mph, 3471 lb. 5th: 5.4-mph, 2230-lb.

6. Clutch. — Power is transmitted through dry type flywheel clutch to selective type change speed gear set. Each track is controlled by slow speed, heavy duty, dry multiple disc clutch.

7. Brakes. — Contracting band brakes.

8. Crawlers. — Gage, center to center of tracks: 44-in. Track length: 61%-in. Track shoe width: 13-in. Grouser height: 2 in. Track shoes, each side: 31. Ground contact: 1589 sq in.

9. Attachments. — The following attachments are issued as standard equipment with the D4 Caterpillar: ANGLEDOZER, LaPlante-Choate 4R. ANGLEDOZER, LeTourneau C-4. BULL- DOZER, LaPlante-Choate or LeTourneau A-4. POWER CONTROL UNIT, LeTourneau T-4. COMBINATION POWER CONTROL UNIT AND WINCH, LeTourneau, HN. WINCH, Hyster D-4A. WINCH, Hyster D4.

10. Dimensions. — Length: 121% 6 in. Width: 62 in. Height: 60% in. Drawbar height: 13%-in. Turning radius: 74-in.

11. Working weight. — Without attachments: 10,000-lb.

12. Shipping data. — Boxed for export (tractor only), completely assembled. No. of boxes: 1. Length: 126-in. Width: 68-in. Height: 69-in. Cubage: 343 cu ft. Weight: 11,600-lb.

== Military service ==
An iconic vehicle used by the Seabees during [WW2] Seabee. Often seen with the term "Natasha", the name of the bulldozer in the John Wayne movie "The Fighting Seabees"The Fighting Seabees. It was equipped with a plow and shipped off to islands in the Pacific to help build a variety of items, including airstrips, supply depots, and roads.

== See also ==
- List of U.S. military vehicles by model number
- List of U.S. military vehicles by supply catalog designation
- M2 light tractor
- M1 heavy tractor
- M1 medium tractor
