= 1M =

1M or 1-M may refer to:

- 1m or 1 metre
- 1M as one million
- Dinas Rekani
- Astra 1M satellite
- Mars 1M spacecraft
- Northrop N-1M, an American experimental aircraft
- Globus-1M No.12L, a Russian military communications satellite
- UH-1M, model of Bell UH-1 Iroquois
- TAC-1M, variant of the semi-automatic carbine Demro TAC-1
- SPP-1M, a variant of the SPP-1 underwater pistol
- PDM-1M mine, a variant of the PDM series of amphibious mines
- VO-1M, an early designation of the Marine Attack Squadron VMA-231
- YaK-1M, a variant of the Yakovlev Yak-1
- SSH 1M (WA), an early name of Washington State Route 121
- BWP-1M, a BMP-1 variant
- BMW 1M, a BMW 1 Series M Coupe

== Other uses ==
- 2021 Salvadoran political crisis, commonly referred to as 1M (1 May)

== See also ==
- M1 (disambiguation)
- LM (disambiguation)
- IM (disambiguation)
