= LM =

The abbreviation LM or lm may refer to:

== Places ==
- County Leitrim, Ireland (vehicle plate code LM)
- Le Mans, a prefecture and commune in France
- Limburg-Weilburg, Germany (vehicle plate code LM)
- Liptovský Mikuláš, Slovakia (vehicle plate code LM)
- Lourenço Marques, Pearl of the Indian Ocean, Mozambique
- Lower Mainland, a region in British Columbia, Canada
- Lower Manhattan, Southern part of Manhattan, New York

== Arts, entertainment, and media ==
- Little Mix, a British four-piece girl group
- LM (magazine), a defunct British computer game magazine
- Living Marxism magazine, published under the name LM between 1997 and 2000
- Long metre or Long Measure, a hymn-metre with four lines of 8 syllables
- LM Radio, an English-language radio station in Mozambique

== Brands and enterprises ==
=== In transportation ===
- ALM Antillean Airlines, a Netherlands Antillean airline; IATA airline designator code
- Lamborghini Militaria, a series of light trucks, the Rambo Lambos
- Lexus LM, a luxury minivan
- Liverpool & Manchester Railway, an early British railway company
- Livingston Energy Flight, an Italian airline; IATA airline designator code
- Loganair, a Scottish airline; IATA airline designator code
- London Midland, a rail operator based in the West Midlands, England

=== In other industries ===
- L&M, a brand of cigarettes
- Ledgewood Mall, a shopping mall in New Jersey
- Legg Mason, an American investment management firm; NYSE ticker symbol
- Local Motors, a defunct American manufacturing company
- Lockheed Martin, an American defense contractor

== Business and finance ==
- IS–LM model in macroeconomics, where LM refers to Liquidity preference-Money supply
- Lean manufacturing
- Maltese lira, the former currency of Malta

== Organizations ==
- Liberal Movement (Australia), a defunct Australian political party
- Lower Merion High School, a Pennsylvania secondary school

== Mathematics, science, and technology ==
=== Mathematics and computing ===
- Linear model, a type of statistical model
- Lagrange multiplier, a method for finding maxima and minima subject to constraints
- LAN Manager, a Microsoft network operating system
- Language model, a mathematical model used in language processing and speech recognition
- Lebesgue measure, in measure theory
- Levenberg–Marquardt algorithm, used to solve non-linear least squares problems
- Leading monomial
- Linear Monolithic, a National Semiconductor prefix for integrated circuits; see List of LM-series integrated circuits
- Linux Mint, a Linux operating system
- LM hash, a Microsoft password hash function
- Long mode, a CPU mode of operation where 64-bit programs are executed (lm is also set as a CPU flag)

=== Science and technology ===
- Apollo Lunar Module spacecraft
- Late Minoan, an archaeological period
- Leonard-Merritt mass estimator, a formula for estimating the mass of a spherical stellar system
- Light meter
- Light microscope
- Line maintenance, a type of Aircraft maintenance checks
- Listeria monocytogenes
- Lumen (unit), a unit of luminous flux

== Sport ==
- 24 Hours of Le Mans race, and related car models
- Late model, a class of racing car
- Left midfielder, a defensive position in association football

== Other uses ==
- Legion of Merit, an American military decoration
- Leiden Manifesto, a guide against misuse of bibliometrics
- Letter modifier, a general category property in Unicode

== See also ==
- 1M (disambiguation)
- IM (disambiguation)
