= MB-2 tow tractor =

The MB-2 tow tractor is an aircraft towing vehicle used by the United States and Allied Air Forces. There are several models of the MB-2 tractor, with weight characteristics between 40,000 and 54,000 lb (18,000 and 24,000 kg).

The tractor could tow aircraft weighing 100,000–500,000 pounds (45,000–227,000 kg).

The first generation was delivered in 1968 to the US Air Force by the Oshkosh Truck Corporation. Oshkosh delivered a total of 72 vehicles under that contract. Since then, several manufacturers have produced the MB-2 vehicle, including Stewart & Stevenson, Grove Corporation, and FMC Technologies(now JBT AeroTech). The Air Force also purchases remanufactured MB-2 tow tractors.

== See also ==
- M2 high-speed tractor
- Omni Directional Vehicle
- U-30 tow tractor
