= M2 light tractor =

Prior to and during the Second World War the US Army called several tractors M2 light tractors. Under the Ordnance Corps these commercial off-the-shelf tractors were meant to tow artillery pieces so were not equipped with blades like their engineer counterparts. Eventually these were replaced by purpose built "high-speed tractors" (HST). Some tractors were equipped with crane attachments for ammunition and material handling.

== Variants ==
- G007 M2 light tractor Caterpillar 20
- G068 M2 light tractor Caterpillar R-2
- G096 M2 light tractor AG Cletrac
- G113 M2 light tractor International T6
- International Harvester model T6 W/angle dozer

== Gallery ==
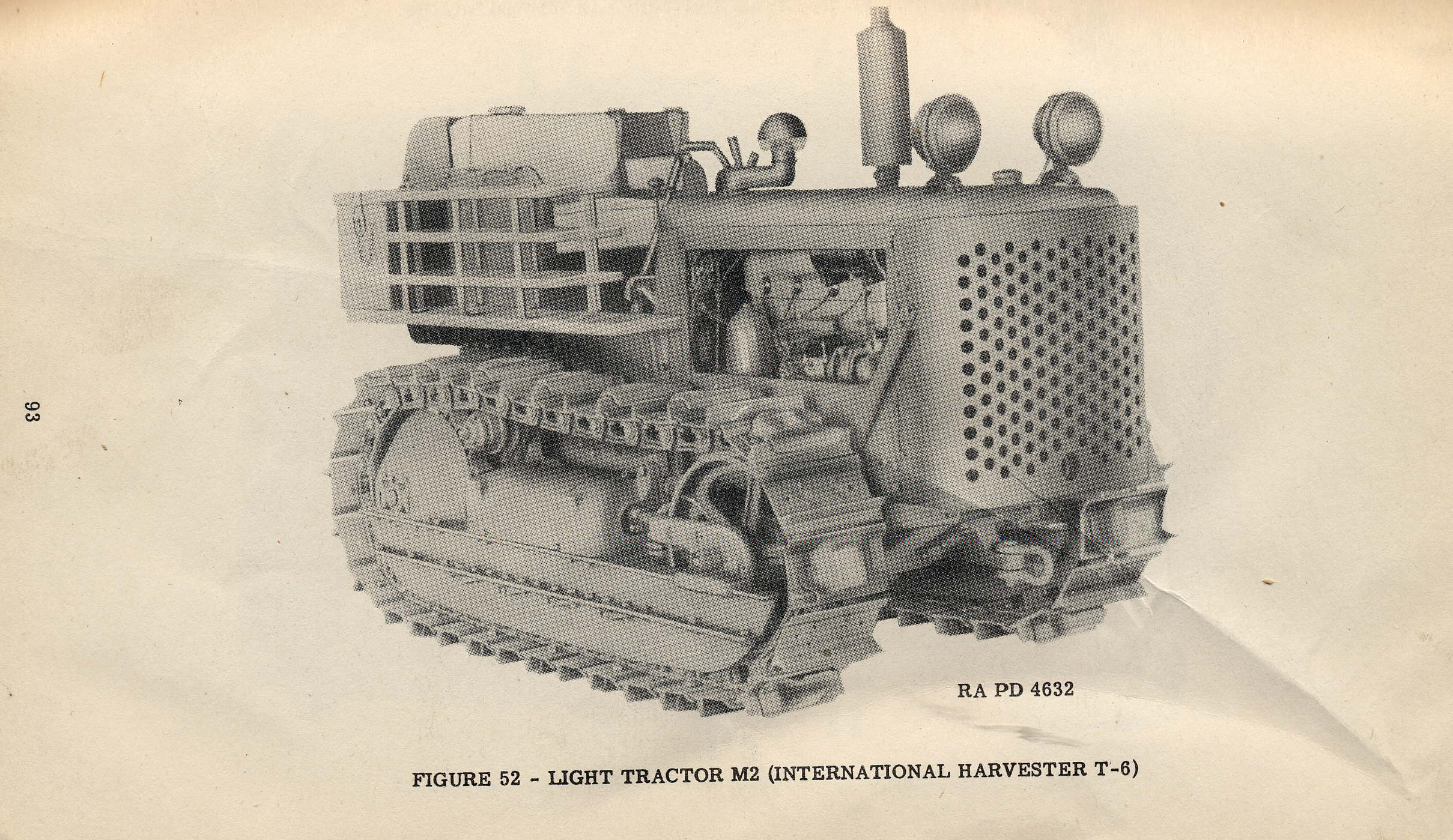
G113, M2 light tractor IH T-6

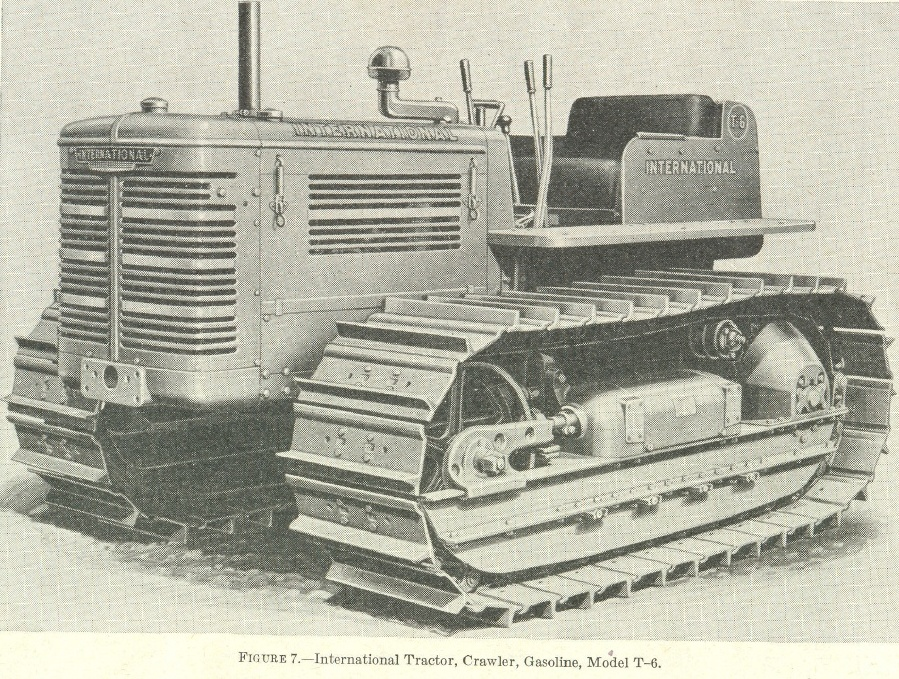
Left view of International tractor, crawler, gasoline, model T-6

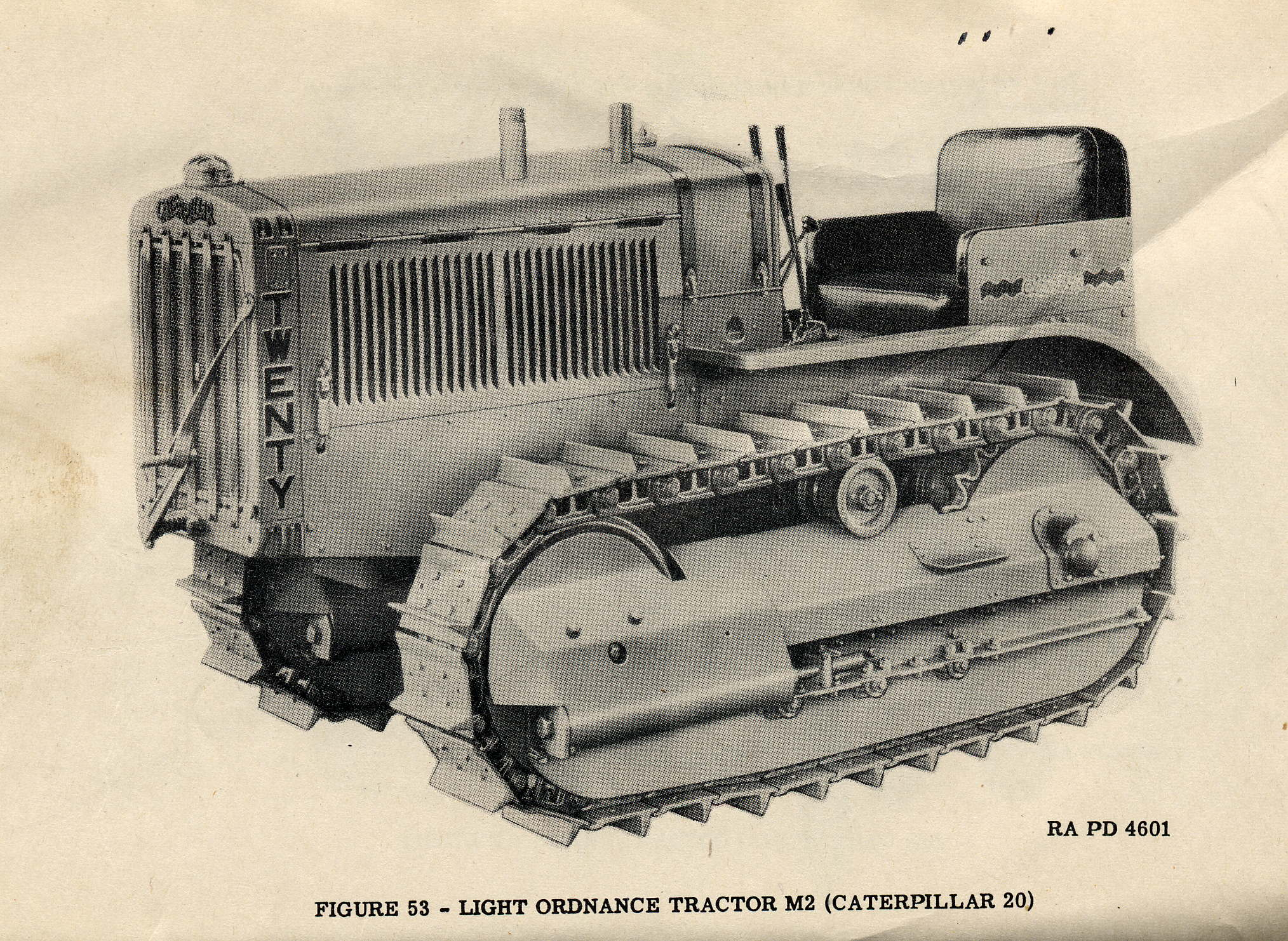
G7 M2 light tractor Cat model 20

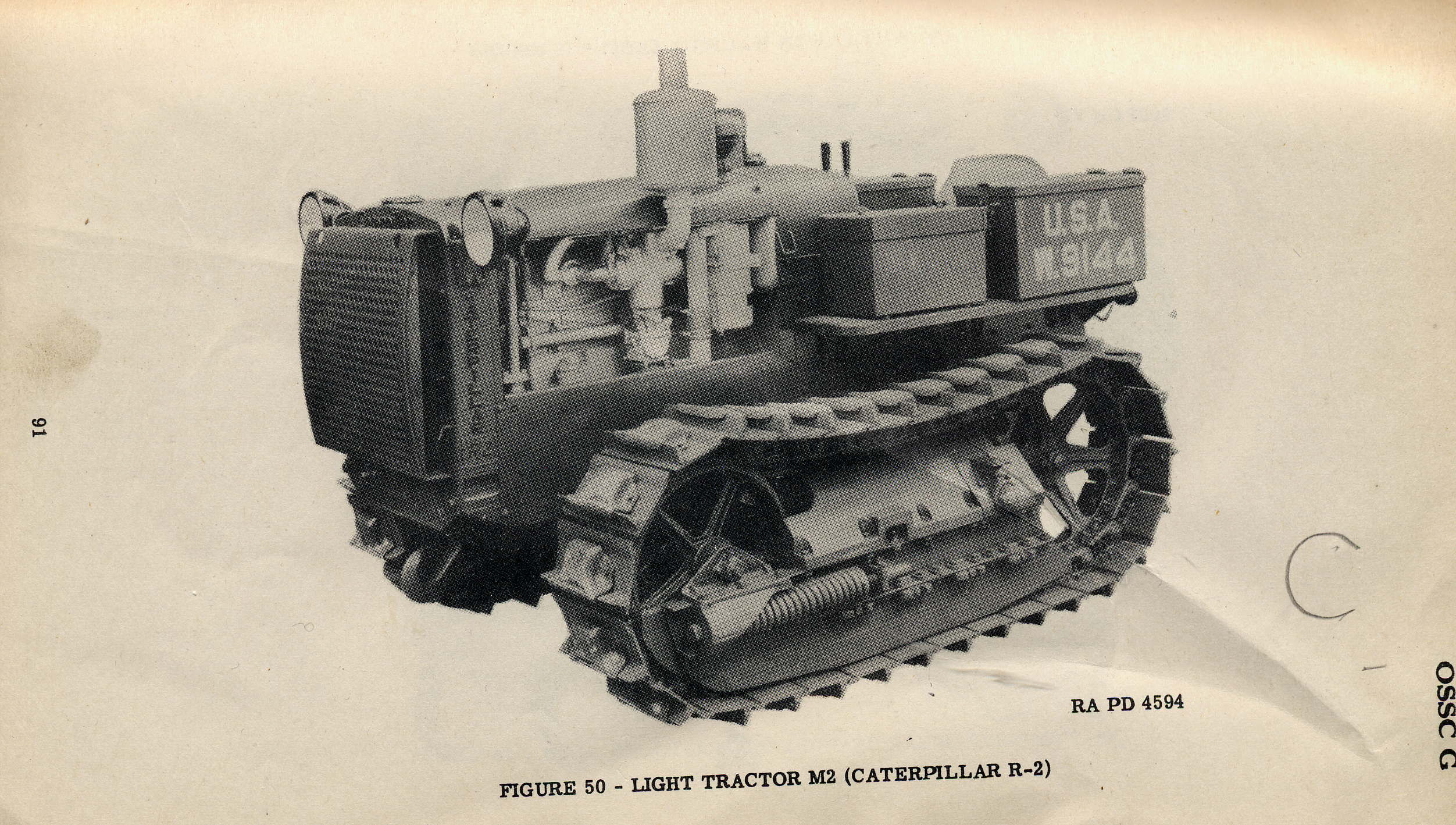
G68 M2 light tractor Cat model R-2

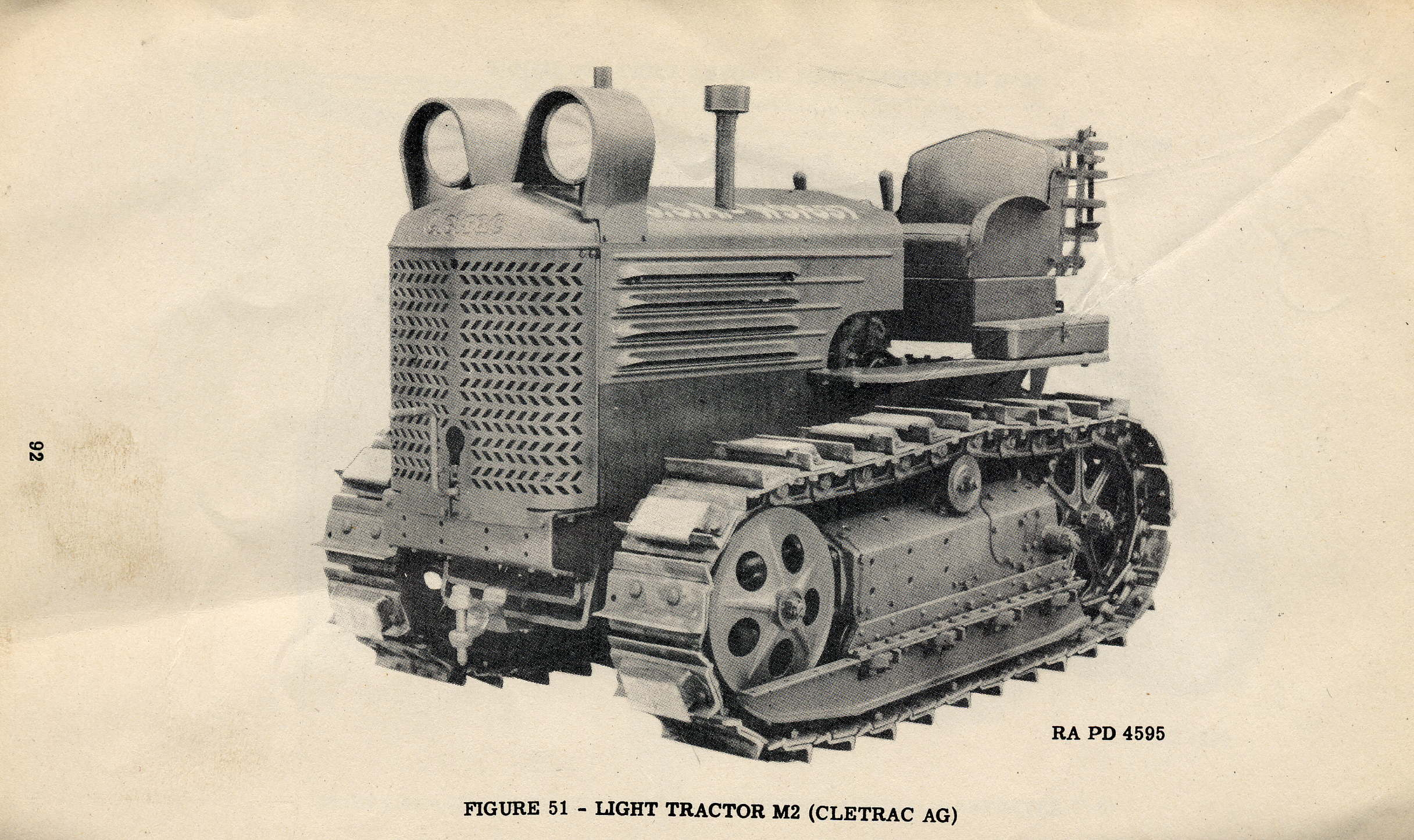
G96 M2 light tractor Cletrac

== See also ==
- M1 light tractor
- M1 medium tractor
- M1 heavy tractor

== Sources ==
- ORD 3 SNL G-1
- TM 9-2800 1943
- TM 9-2800 1947
