= Omni Directional Vehicle =

Utility vehicle

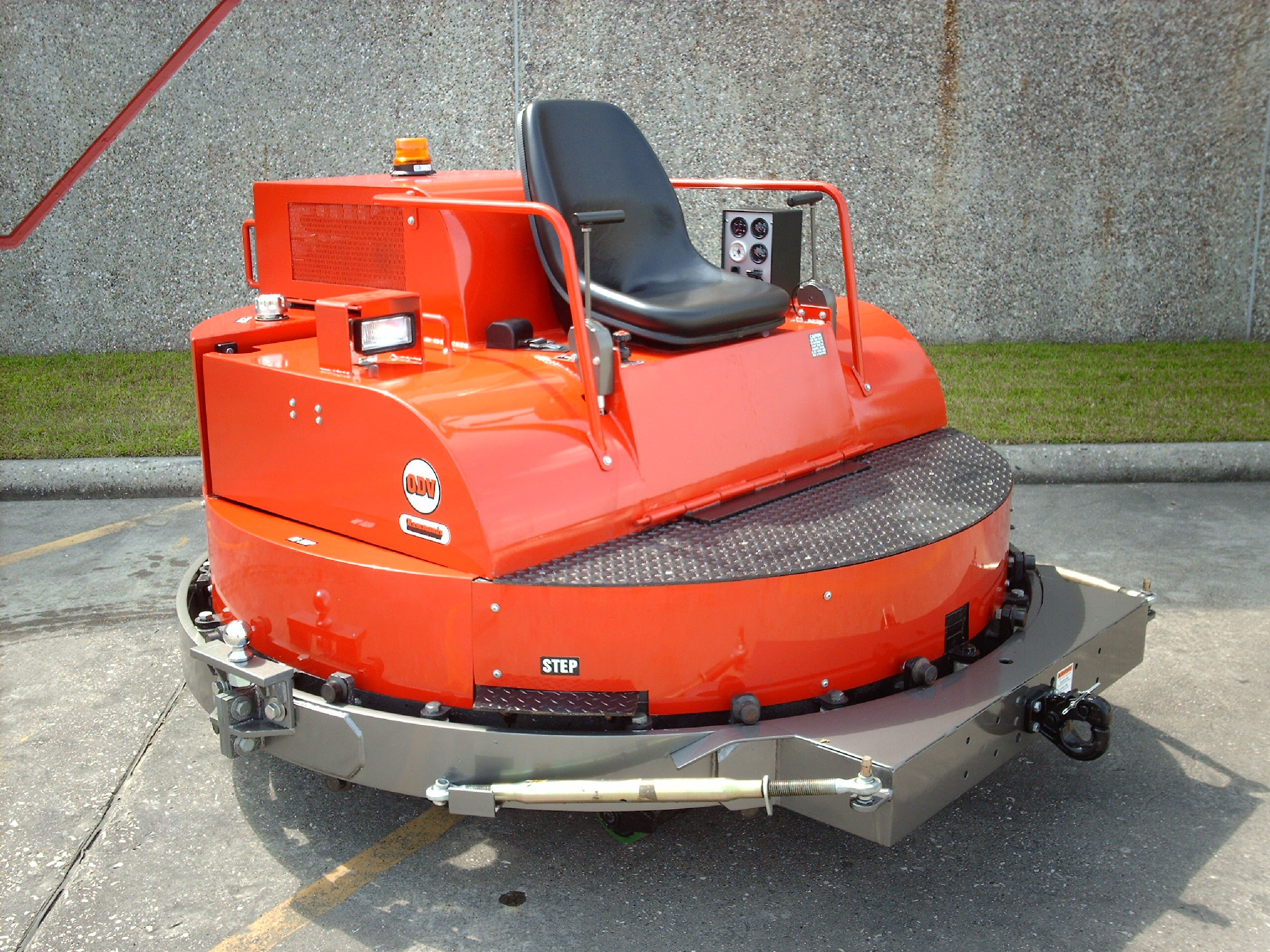
Omni Directional Vehicle G-Series

The Omni Directional Vehicle (ODV) is a ground support utility vehicle manufactured by Hammonds Technical Services Inc. in Houston, Texas. The ODV can perform a variety of jobs, including towing aircraft and plowing snow. The largest variant, the G-90, can tow up to 90,000 pounds. The ODV's main advantage over other utility vehicles is its zero degree turning radius, which allows it to turn in any direction from a fixed point. This allows the ODV to operate in confined spaces by eliminating the need to turn the vehicle in a large arc. The driver can also tow in any direction without having to look over their shoulder. The ODV is a round vehicle with a rotary hitch mounted on its outer ring to allow the driver to quickly make adjustments or to switch between pushing or pulling. The vehicle turns by engaging either of its two drive wheels.

== History and development ==
The ODV began development in the late 1990s, and was slated to enter the commercial ground support equipment market in 2001, but the 9/11 Terrorist Attacks lowered demand for new ground support vehicles as airlines cut costs. Since then, Boeing has purchased several ODV's for its 787 Dreamliner project. The United States Air Force has also procured ODVs for use at Robins Air Force Base

== Variants ==
The ODV comes in four general models, the G-18, G-30, G-60 and G-90. Each vehicle can be fitted with attachments that convert the ODV into a tow bar tractor, a towbarless tractor (the ODAT), snow plow, or rotary broom.

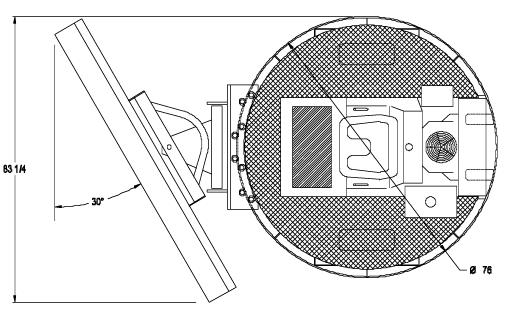
ODV Schematic with snow plow attachment

Specifications	G-18	G-30	G-60	G-90
Towing capacity	18,000 lbs	30,000 lbs	60,000 lbs	90,000 lbs
Weight	1,500 lbs	2,686 lbs	4,052 lbs	5,822 lbs
Dimensions height x width	50"x80"	50"x85"	50"x85"	57"x85"
Engine	2 cylinder gas	3 cylinder diesel	4 cylinder diesel	4 cylinder diesel
Horsepower	25 HP	34 HP	45 HP	45 HP
Alternative fuels	LPG	LPG/natural gas	LPG/natural gas	LPG/natural gas

== In popular culture ==
The ODV appeared in the 2009 film Star Trek (2009 film) as one of the loading vehicles at Starfleet Academy.

== See also ==
- MB-2 tow tractor
- M2 high-speed tractor
- U-30 tow tractor
