= M1 medium tractor =

IHC TD-14
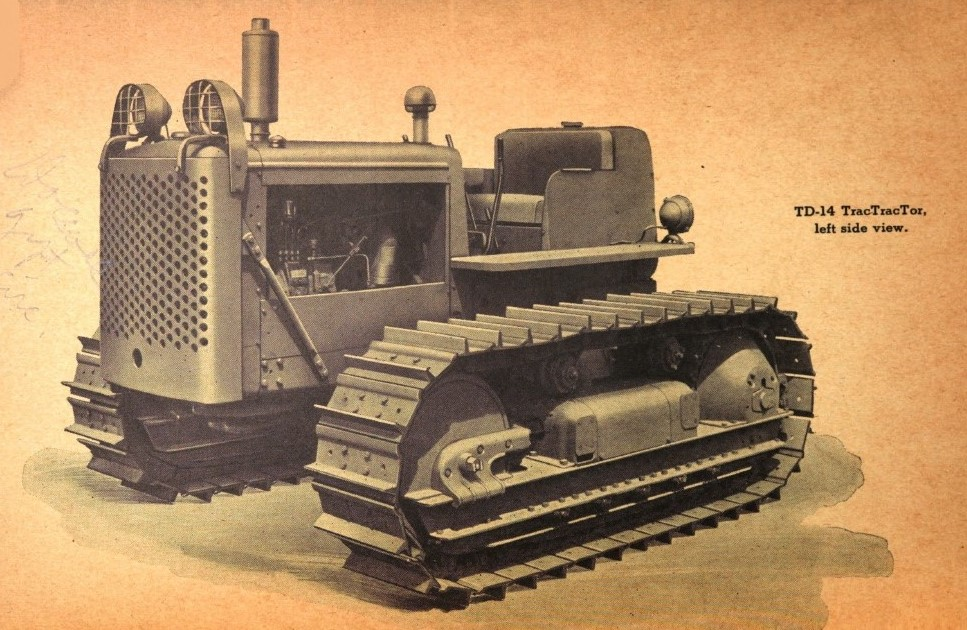
- International TD-14 crawler tractor
- Manufacturer: International Harvester Corp.
- Length: 136 in (3.45 m)
- Width: 92 in (2.34 m)
- Height: 89 in (2.26 m)
- Weight: 21,250 lb (9,640 kg)
- Propulsion: Caterpillar tracks
- Engine model: IHC TD-14
- Gross power: 60 hp (45 kW)
- Drawbar pull: 19,000 lb (8,600 kg)
- Speed: 5 3/4 mph (9.3 km/h) Forward; 3 3/8 mph (5.4 km/h)Reverse

Prior to and during the second world war the US Army called several tractors M1 medium tractor. Under the Ordnance Corps these "off the shelf" tractors were meant to tow artillery pieces, so were not equipped with blades like their engineer counterparts. Eventually these were replaced by purpose built "high-speed tractors" (HST). Some tractors were equipped with crane attachments for ammunition, and material handling.

== Tractors ==
- Caterpillar model 30
- Caterpillar model 35
- Allis-Chalmers HD-7W.
- Allis-Chalmers Monarch k35
- Cletrac model 35
- Caterpillar model Caterpillar RD6
- Caterpillar D6
- Cletrac model BC, w/angle dozer
- Allis-Chalmers WM
- G-132: a) M1 medium tractor TD-14, b) M3 tractor crane, 2-Ton, International Harvester TD14

== Gallery ==
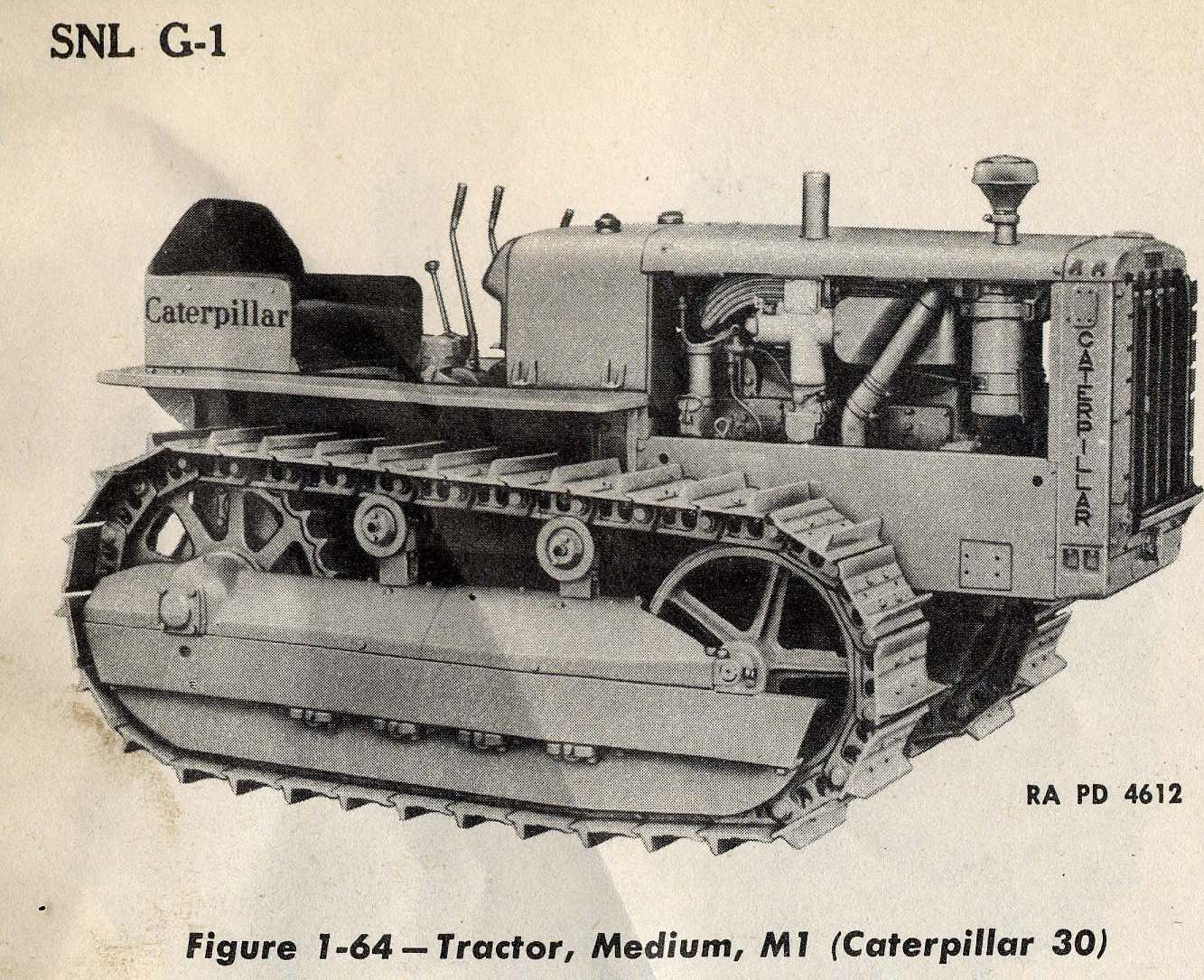
G21 M1 medium tractor Cat model 30

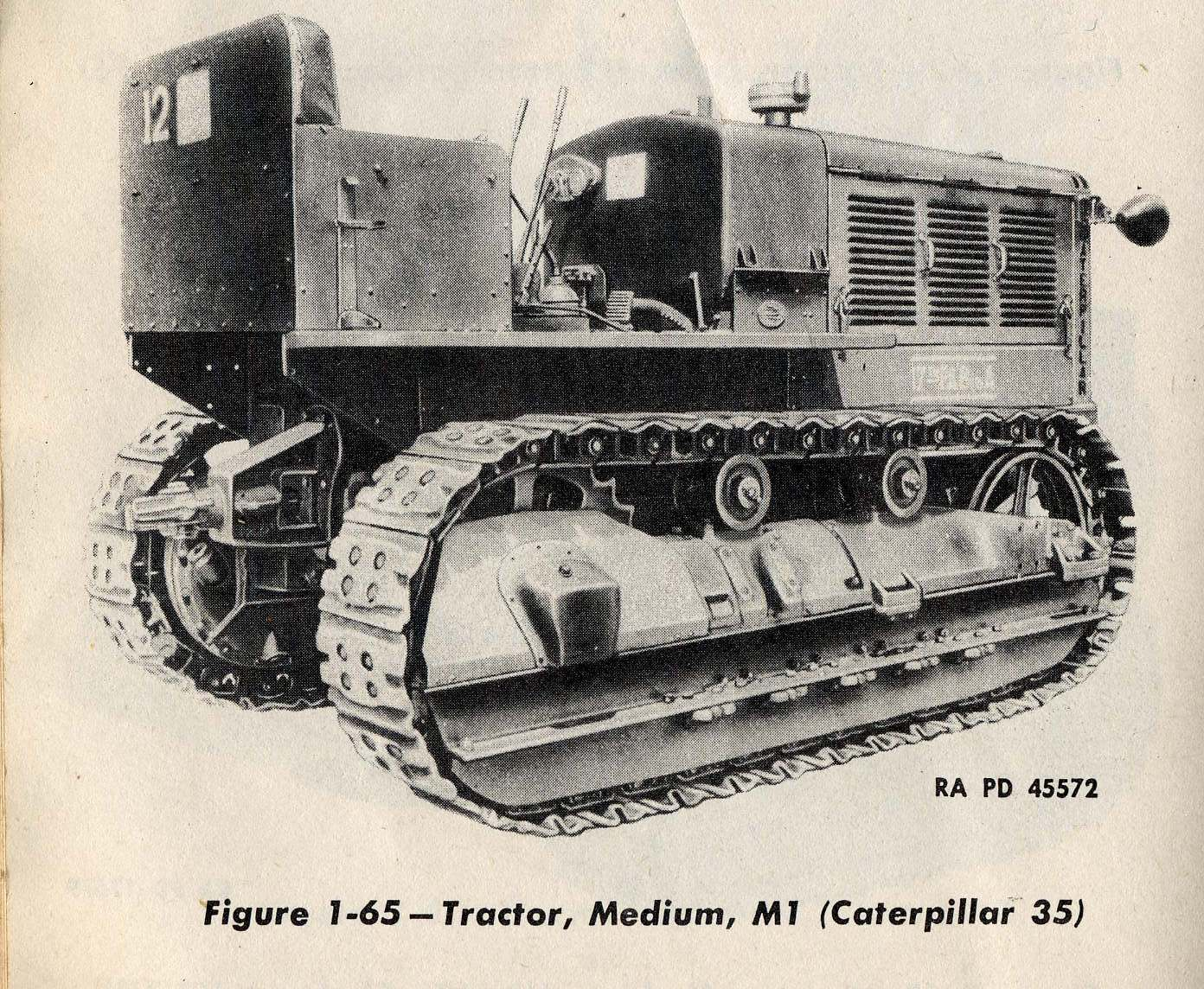
G47 M1 medium tractor Cat model 35

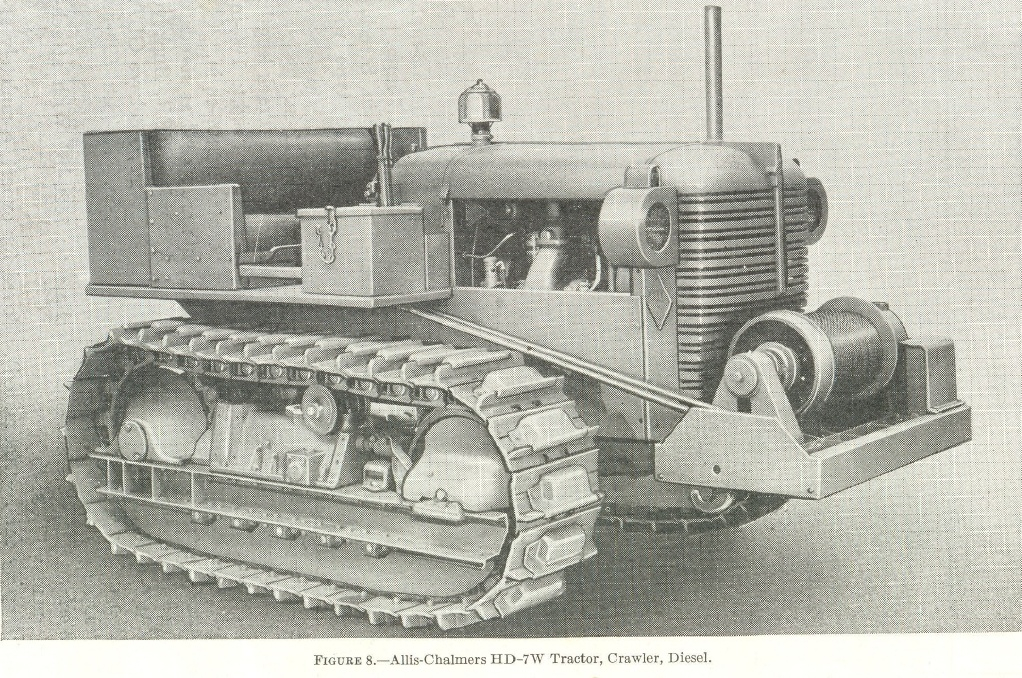
Allis-Chalmers tractor, crawler, diesel, model HD-7W from TB 5-9720-11, 1944

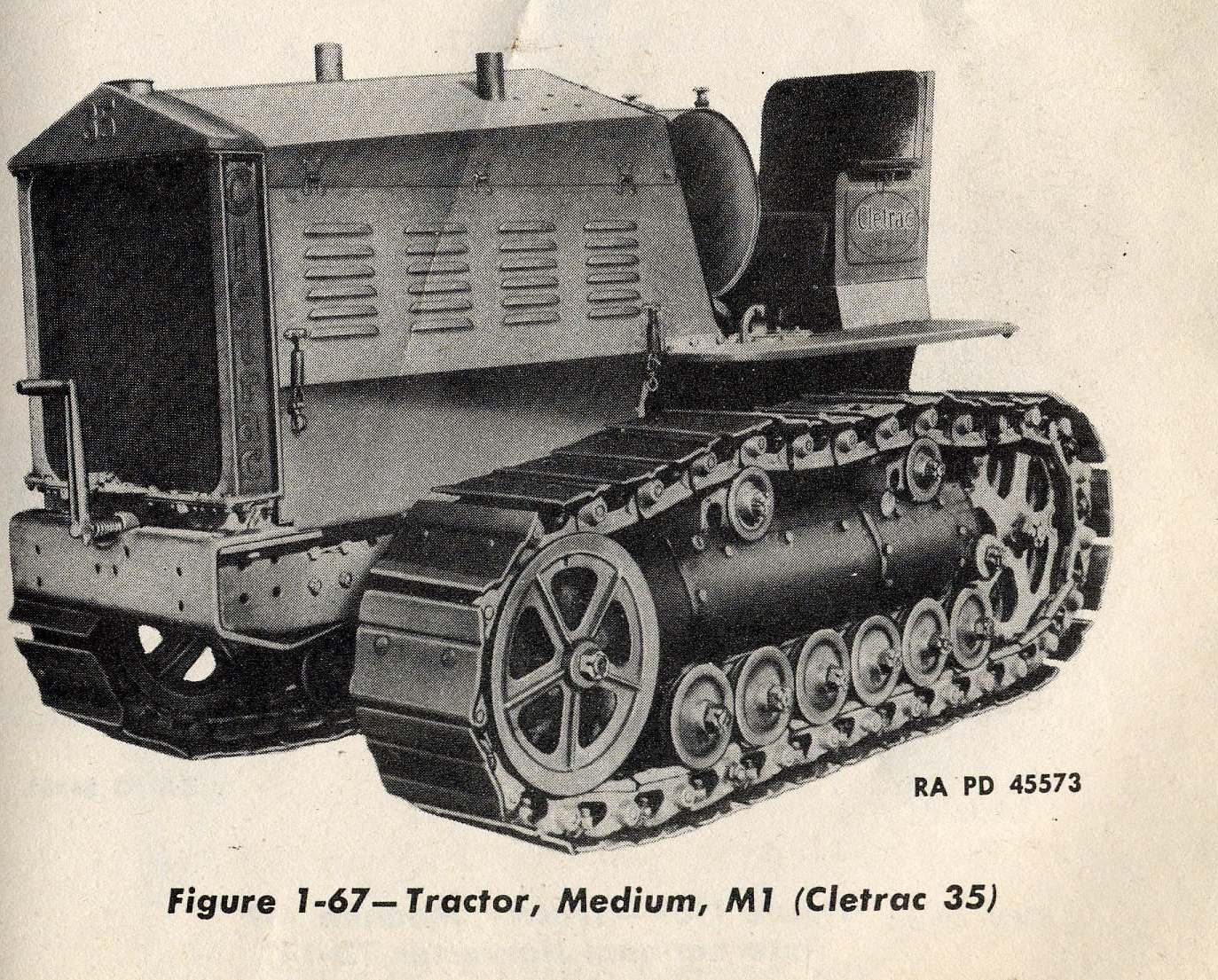
G49 M1 medium tractor Cletrac model 35

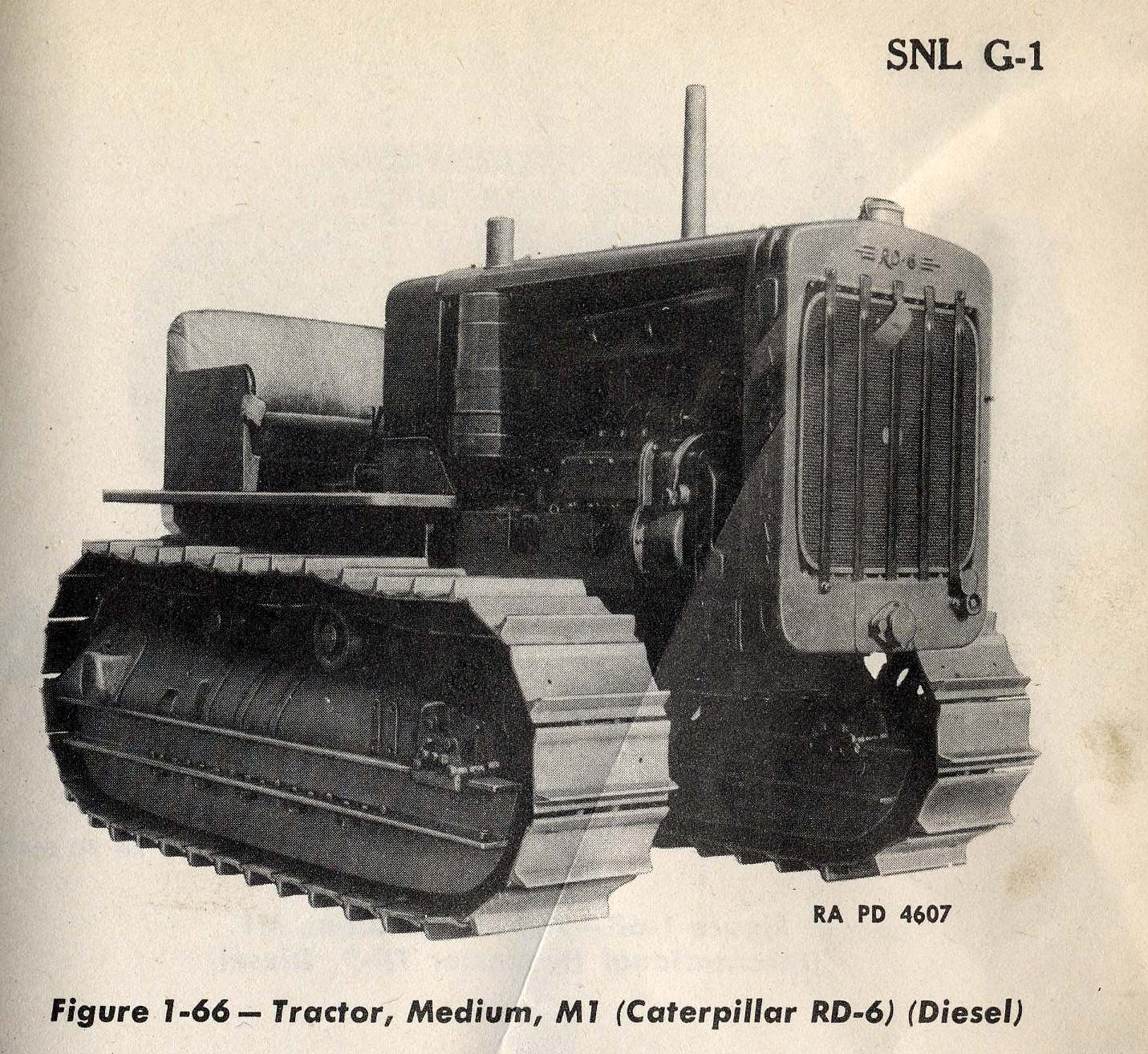
G69 M1 medium tractor Cat model RD-6

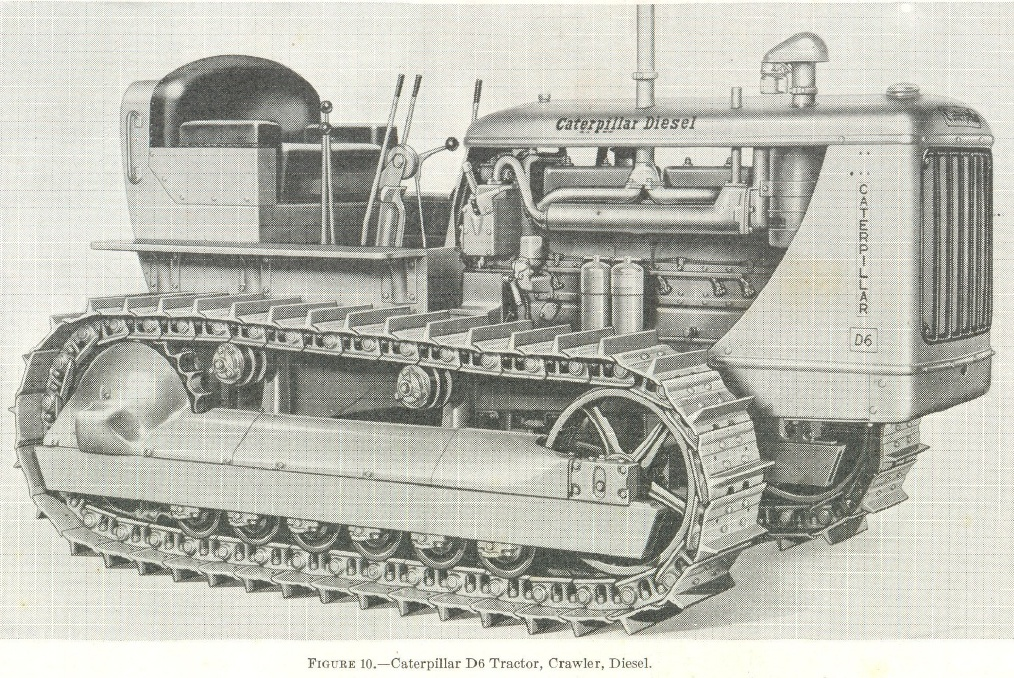
Right view of Caterpillar D6 tractor, crawler, diesel from TB 5-9720-11, 1944

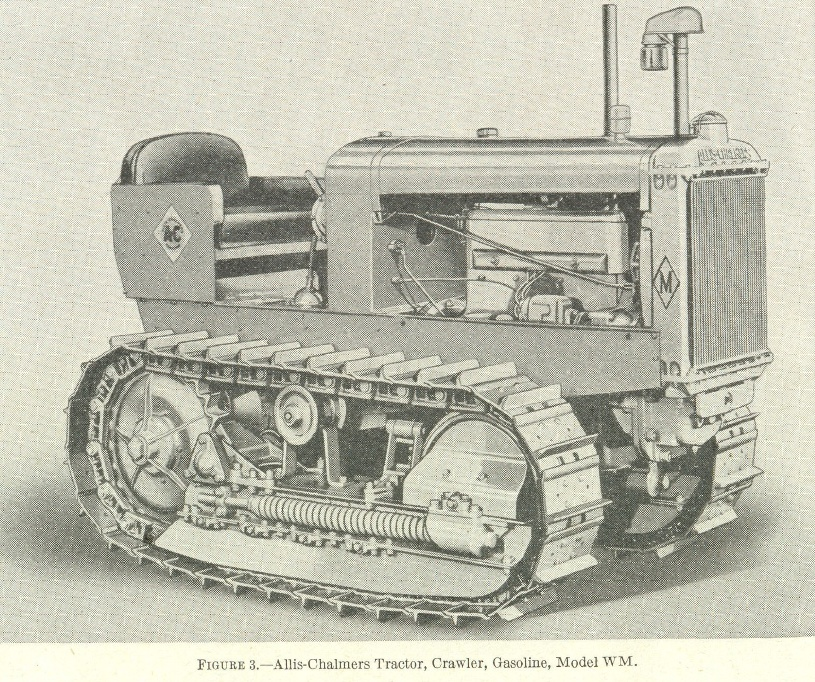
Right view of Allis-Chalmers tractor, gasoline, model WM from TB 5-9720-11, 1944

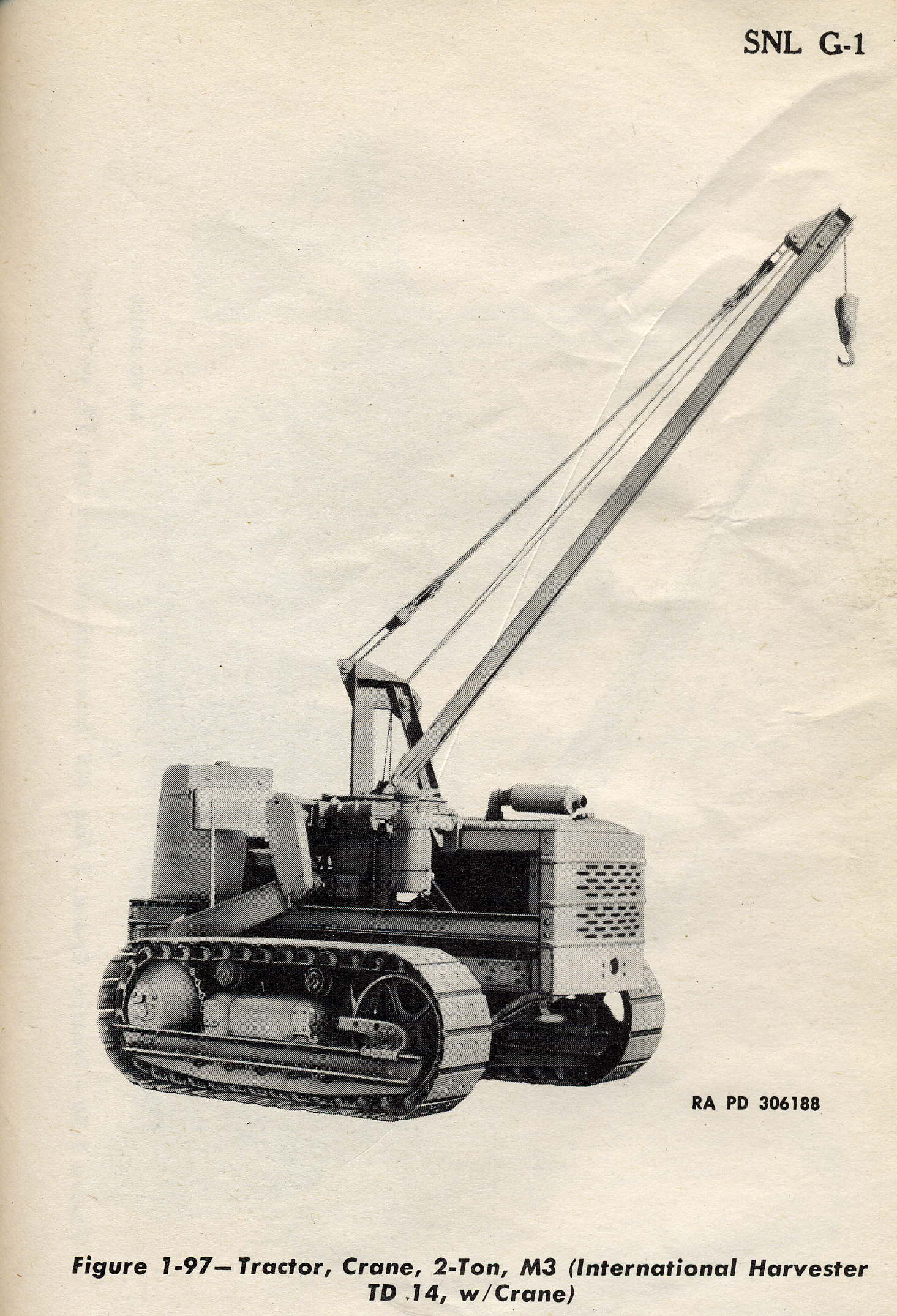
G132 M3 tractor crane on IH TD-14

== Detailed information on Allis-Chalmers model WM ==
- Engine: Allis-Chalmers WM. Gasoline. 4-cylinder 20 hp (15 kW)
- Fuel tank: 24 gallons 750 US gal (2,800 L)
- gearbox: Four speeds forward, one reverse.
- Length: 101 in (257 cm)
- Width: 67 in (170 cm)
- Height: 56 in (142 cm)
- Working weight: 6,730 lb (3,050 kg)

== See also ==
- M1 heavy tractor
- M1 light tractor
- M2 light tractor
- List of U.S. military vehicles by model number
- List of U.S. military vehicles by supply catalog designation
