= Moreland M-1 =

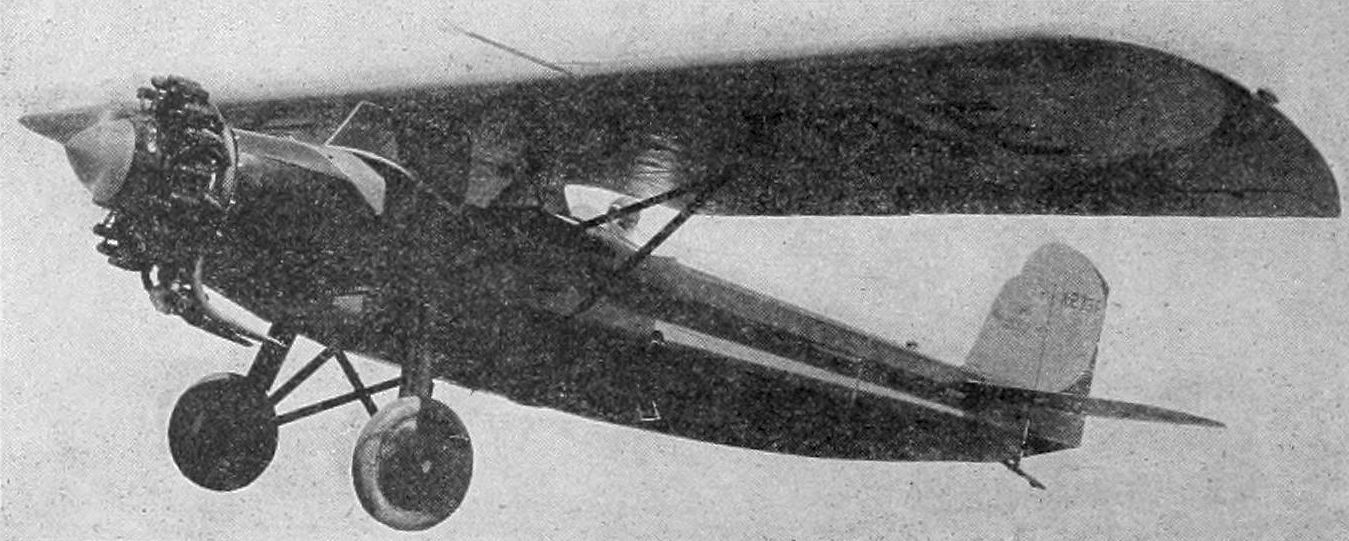

General information
- Type: Three-seat light sports and transport biplane
- National origin: United States
- Manufacturer: Moreland Aircraft Inc.
- Number built: 4

History
- First flight: 1929

The Moreland M-1 was a 1929 American three-seat civil aircraft. Only four were built.

== Design and development ==
The M-1 was the first aircraft built by Moreland aircraft, founded in 1928 and based at El Segundo, California. Led by G.E. Moreland and Orrin Moe, the design also contained Ed Heinemann's first contributions. It was a parasol wing aircraft with wings of rectangular plan apart from rounded tips and a central, trailing edge cut-out to enhance the pilot's field of view. It had wooden structures with spruce box-spars and ribs, were plywood-covered and braced to the fuselage by pairs of outward-leaning N-form struts between the mid- and lower longerons and the wing spars. These struts were quite short, reaching the wings at about 25% span. A cabane provided central wing support.

The M-1's nine-cylinder Wright J-5 Whirlwind radial engine was nose mounted, flown with or without a ring-type engine cowling. The fuselage of the M-1 had a welded chrome-molybdenum steel tube structure, like many designs of the time, and was fabric covered. Zips provided easy access to the rear control connections. Two passengers sat side-by-side close to the wing underside at about mid-chord. They were protected by a large, V-shaped windscreen, which projected forward of the leading edge to the engine mounting and rearwards to the hinge of a large access door. The pilot's well-instrumented cockpit was under the trailing edge cut-out, providing views both above and below the wing.

The M-1's vertical rear control surfaces were rather straight and upright, though the balanced rudder was round-tipped. Its tailplane, mounted on top of the fuselage, was adjustable and wire-braced to the fin.

The undercarriage was a split-axle design, with the axles hinged from the fuselage central underside. Near-vertical Aerol shock absorber legs were fuselage-mounted at the base of the forward wing struts, and drag struts reached rearward to the lower fuselage.

== Operational history ==
The M-1 first flew in 1929, though the exact date is not known; it received its type certificate in September. It featured at the Air Show held in Cleveland in the autumn of 1929. Only four were built.

== Specifications ==
Data from Aero Digest (September 1929) except where noted

General characteristics

- Crew: one
- Capacity: two passengers
- Length: 26 ft 6 in (8.08 m)
- Wingspan: 39 ft (12 m)
- Height: 8 ft 9 in (2.67 m)
- Wing area: 260 sq ft (24 m^{2}) including ailerons
- Empty weight: 1,750 lb (794 kg)
- Gross weight: 2,750 lb (1,247 kg)
- Fuel capacity: 70 US gal (58 imp gal; 260 L)
- Powerplant: 1 × Wright J-5 Whirlwind nine cylinder radial, 225 hp (168 kW) at 1,800 rpm
- Propellers: 2-bladed

Performance

- Maximum speed: 132 mph (212 km/h, 115 kn)
- Cruise speed: 115 mph (185 km/h, 100 kn)
- Landing speed: 40 mph (64 km/h; 35 kn)
- Range: 650 mi (1,050 km, 560 nmi)
- Service ceiling: 17,800 ft (5,400 m) ; absolute ceiling 20,000 ft (6,100 m)
- Rate of climb: 1,000 ft/min (5.1 m/s) initial
