= Independent Methodist =

Independent Methodist may refer to:

- Fellowship of Independent Methodist Churches, based in the United Kingdom
- Independent Methodist Connexion, based in the United Kingdom
- Association of Independent Methodists, based in the United States
