= M2 high-speed tractor =

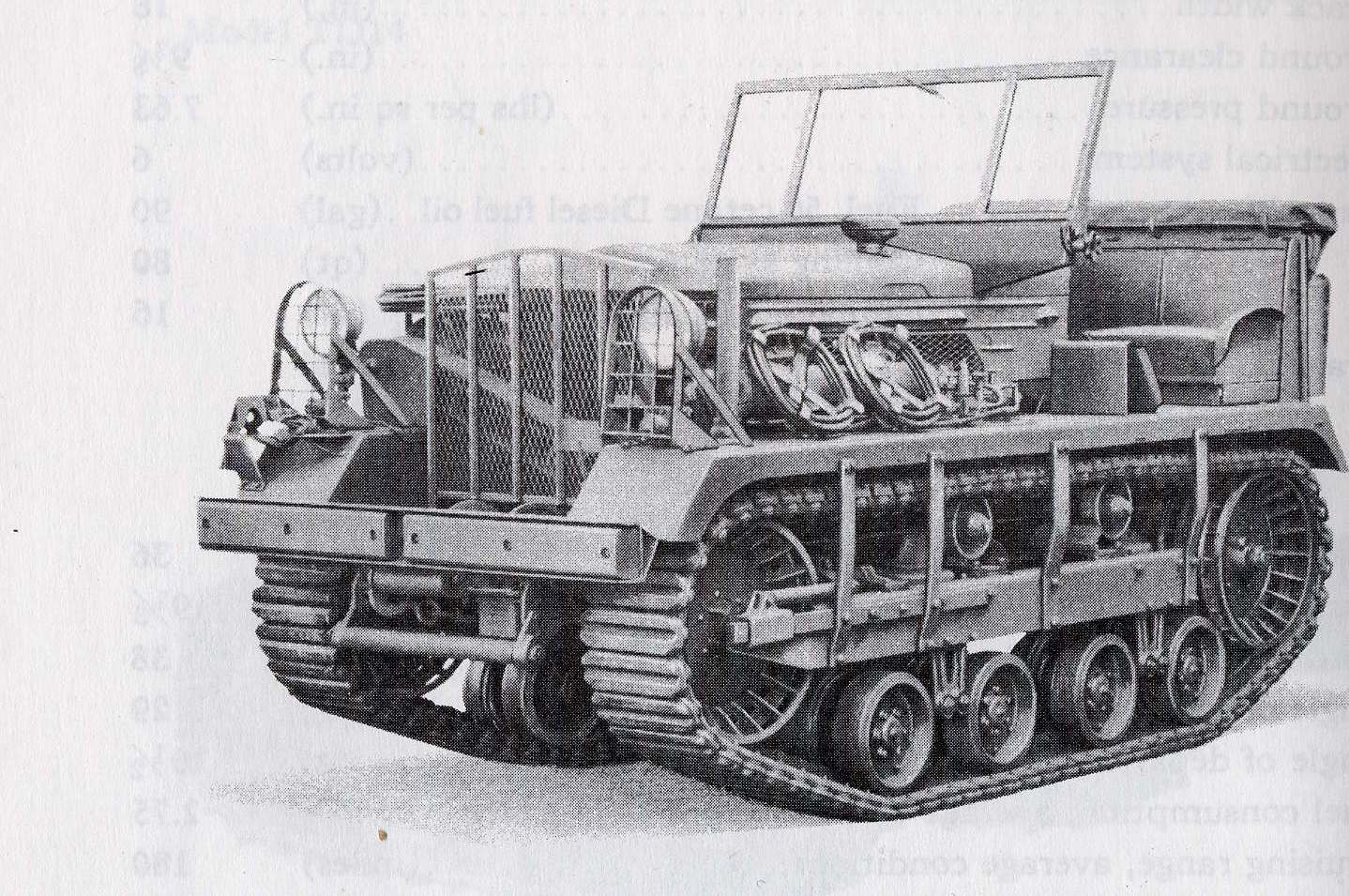
- Type: Aircraft tug
- Place of origin: United States

Service history
- In service: By 1943
- Used by: US Army
- Wars: World War II

Production history
- Designed: February 1941
- Manufacturer: Cleveland Tractor Company
- No. built: 8,510

Specifications
- Mass: 14,700 lb (6.7 t)
- Length: 166 in (4.22 m)
- Width: 70 in (1.78 m)
- Height: 68 in (1.73 m)
- Crew: 3
- Engine: Hercules WXLC3, 6-cylinder, petrol engine 150 hp (112 kW)
- Suspension: Volute spring
- Operational range: 100 mi (160 km)
- Maximum speed: 22 mph (35 km/h)

The M2 high-speed tractor (or colloquially M2 Cletrac) was an aircraft tug used by the United States Army Air Forces from 1942.

== Construction ==
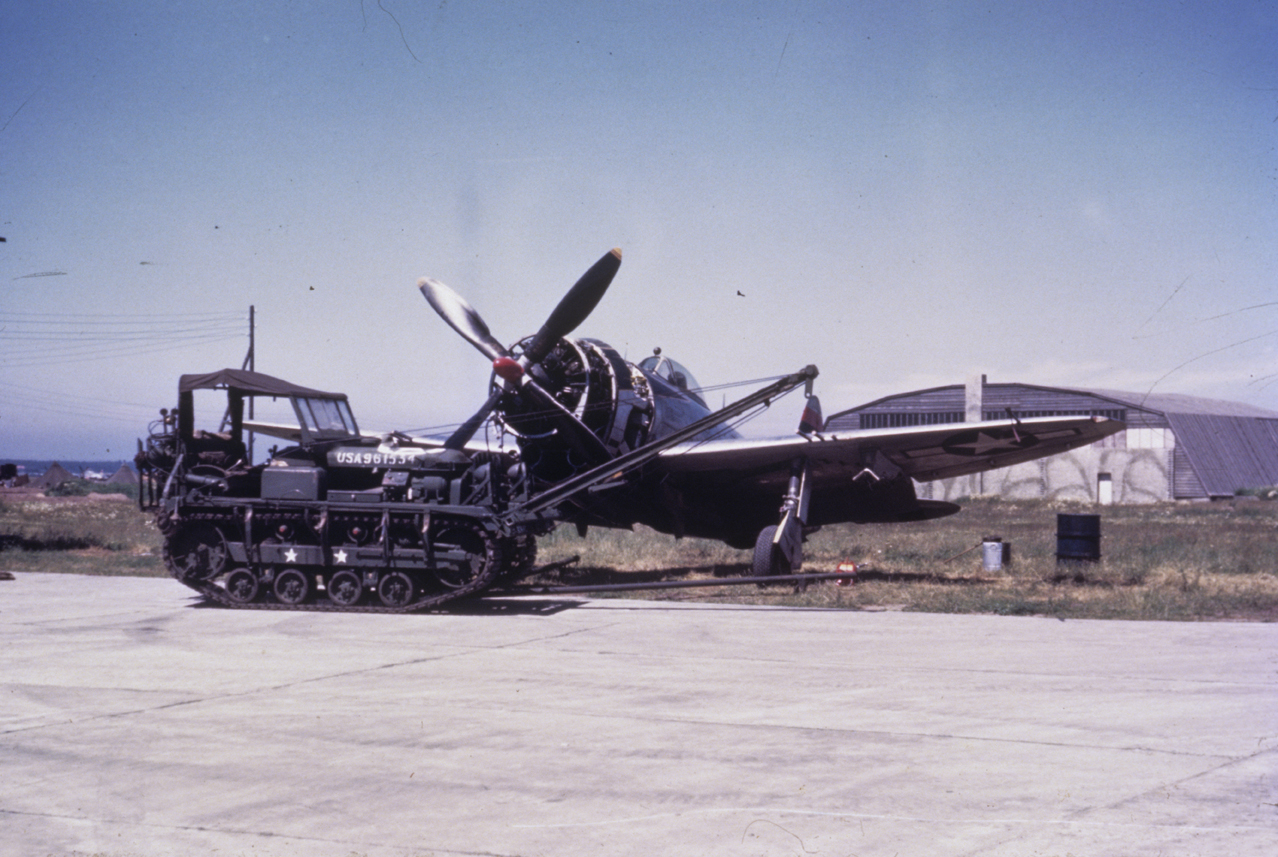
Cletrac in front of a P-47 Thunderbolt of the 406th Fighter Group

The M2 is a fully tracked vehicle designed to tow aircraft on primitive airfields. It was equipped with a 10,000 lb (4,500 kg) winch with 300 ft (91 m) of 3/8 in (9.5 mm) cable, an auxiliary generator (3 kW at 110 volts DC), and an air compressor (3 stage, 16.7 CFPM, 2,000 PSI).

== History ==
The M2 was standardized in February 1941 as Medium Tractor M2.

== Surviving artifacts ==
Surviving examples are at the Estrella Warbird Museum, the Wright Museum, the AAF Museum in Danville, VA, Overloon War Museum, the Pima Air & Space Museum, the Evergreen Aviation & Space Museum, the Yanks Air Museum, Chino CA, the March Field Air Museum in Riverside CA, The National WWII Museum in New Orleans, Bright's Pioneer Museum, Plainsburg CA, two at the Danville Armour Museum, Danville, VA, and one privately held in Belton, SC, USA. Abroad, one can be found, in perfect condition, at the American Air Museum, in Duxford (UK), and the National Military Vehicle Museum (AU).

== See also ==
- List of U.S. military vehicles by supply catalog designation
- List of U.S. military vehicles by model number
- M4 tractor
- MB-2 tow tractor
- Omni Directional Vehicle
- U-30 tow tractor
