= Ím =

Norse mythical character

Ím (also Imr) is a jötunn in Norse mythology, and the son of Vafthrudnir.

== Name ==
The Old Norse name Ím has been translated as 'dust' (compare with Norw. īm 'smell', Far. ím 'soot [on a kettle]'; also Icel. ima 'heat', Swed. imme 'steam').

== Attestation ==
According to the stanza 5 of the poem Vafthrudnismal from the Poetic Edda:

"Then Odin went to try the wisdom
of the all-wise giant [Vafthrudnir];
to the hall he came which Im's father owned;
Odin went inside."

— Larrington trans.

Ím is also mentioned in a list of giants in the Skaldskaparmal section of the Prose Edda by Snorri Sturluson.
