= Mission: Impossible (disambiguation) =

Mission: Impossible is a multimedia franchise.

Mission: Impossible may also refer to

== Arts and media ==
=== Television ===
- Mission: Impossible (1966 TV series), a 1966–1973 American television series
- Mission: Impossible (1988 TV series), the 1988–1990 revival
- "Mission Impossible" (My Hero), a TV sitcom episode

=== Films ===
- Mission: Impossible (film series), a series of films based upon the television series
  - Mission: Impossible (film), 1996, first film in the series
- Mishan Impossible, a 2022 Indian Telugu-language film by Swaroop R. S. J.

=== Video games ===
- Mission: Impossible (1990 video game), based on the 1980s TV series
- Mission: Impossible (1998 video game), based on the 1996 film
- Mission: Impossible (1999 video game), based on the film series

=== Music ===
- Mission: Impossible (soundtrack), the soundtrack to the 1996 film

== Other ==
- Mission Impossible (JTQ album), a 1987 album by James Taylor Quartet

== See also ==
- Mission: Incredible (disambiguation)
- "Missionary: Impossible", a 2000 episode of The Simpsons
