= ML =

ML or ml may refer to:

== Computing and mathematics ==
- ML (programming language), a general-purpose functional programming language
- .ml, the top-level Internet domain for Mali
- Machine learning, a field of artificial intelligence
- Markup language, a system for annotating a document
- Mathematical Logic, a variation of Quine's system New Foundations
- Module-Lattice cryptography:
  - ML-DSA, the Module-Lattice-Based Digital Signature Standard for post-quantum cryptography
  - ML-KEM, the Module-Lattice-Based Key-Encapsulation Mechanism Standard for post-quantum cryptography
- MultiLevel Recording, to increase the storage capacity of optical discs

== Businesses ==
- Malaysia-Singapore Airlines, IATA code ML until 1972
- M Lhuillier, a non-banking financial services company in the Philippines
- Merrill Lynch, the wealth management division of Bank of America
- Midway Airlines (1976–1991), IATA code ML

== Languages ==
- Malayalam (ISO 639-1 code), a language

== Measurement ==
- Megalitre or megaliter (ML, Ml, or Mℓ), a unit of volume
- Millilitre or milliliter (mL, ml, or mℓ), a unit of volume
- Millilambert (mL), a non-SI unit of luminance
- Richter magnitude scale (M_{L}), used to measure earthquakes
- Megalangmuir (ML), a unit of exposure of a surface to a given chemical species (convention is 1 ML=monolayer=1 Langmuir)

== Media ==
- ML (film), a 2018 Philippine film
- Mobile Legends, short for Mobile Legends: Bang Bang, a mobile MOBA game by Moonton

== Places ==
- Mali (ISO 3166-1 country code), a country in Africa
- ML postcode area, Motherwell postcode area of Scotland
- McConnell Unit, a prison near Beeville, Texas

== Politics ==
- Mamamayang Liberal, a political organization in the Philippines
- Marxism–Leninism, a form of communist ideology as practiced in the Soviet Union and other nations

== Awards and titles ==
- Master of Laws (abbreviated as M.L. or LL.M.), a postgraduate academic degree
- Mountain Leader Award, a UK qualification
- Mom Luang, a Thai royal title

== Other ==
- 1050, in Roman numerals
- Dean ML, a model of electric guitar
- ML 8-inch shell gun
- Mercedes-Benz GLE-Class, formerly known as the ML-Class
- Motor launch (naval), a type of small Royal Navy vessel used by British Coastal Forces
- Silt, in the Unified Soil Classification System

== See also ==
- M1 (disambiguation)
- MI (disambiguation)
