= WHATSIT =

WHATSIT? is a freeform database program that was available for the Apple II and the CP/M operating system. It was developed by Lyall Morill (Computer Headware) in 1977. The name is an backronym for Wow! How'd All That Stuff get In There?.

Morill improved WHATSIT? and Information Unlimited Software (IUS) introduced the program at the second West Coast Computer Faire in the spring of 1978.
