= Matteson M-1 =

American glider

M-1

General information
- Type: Glider
- National origin: United States
- Designer: Fred Matteson and Alfred Vogt
- Status: Sole example written off
- Number built: 1

History
- Introduction date: 1959

The Matteson M-1 was an American high-wing, single-seat, FAI Open Class glider that was designed and built by Fred Matteson of Palo Alto, California and Alfred Vogt of Schempp-Hirth.

== Design and development ==
Work on the M-1 started in 1955 at the Schempp-Hirth factory, while Matteson was on military duty in West Germany. The design that Matteson had conceived was adapted to German metric standards and materials by Alfred Vogt who did the early construction work. After being posted back to the United States Matteson completed the aircraft in 1959 in California.

The M-1 was built from wood and covered with doped aircraft fabric covering. The semi-tapered wing was of 51 ft (15.5 m) span and used a NACA 63-518 wing root airfoil, transitioning to a NACA 4412 airfoil at the wing tip. The three-piece wing, with a fixed center section and removable tips, featured a foam-filled leading edge and large-sized lower surface dive brakes. The aircraft had a conventional tail with a tall, straight vertical fin. The M-1 used a take-off dolly, landing on a fixed skid.

Only one M-1 was ever built.

== Operational history ==
Matteson later sold the completed aircraft and subsequent owners included Dr Gary Grant of Yuba City, California, Robert R. Kirby of Santa Ynez, California and Ron Tabery of Austin Texas.

Kirby described the aircraft: "I have flown the ship and it is a very fine machine. Its drawbacks are difficult assembly and a poor landing gear system." While he owned it Kirby modified the aircraft to try to address some of the noted deficiencies.

The M-1 is no longer on the Federal Aviation Administration aircraft registry and its registration has been reassigned. It was reported that the aircraft was likely written off.

== Specifications (M-1) ==
Data from Soaring, The World's Sailplanes:Die Segelflugzeuge der Welt:Les Planeurs du Monde Volume II

General characteristics

- Crew: One
- Length: 22 ft 3 in (6.79 m)
- Wingspan: 51 ft 0 in (15.54 m)
- Wing area: 130.24 sq ft (12.100 m^{2})
- Aspect ratio: 20.2:1
- Airfoil: Root: NACA 63-518, Tip: NACA 4412
- Empty weight: 516 lb (234 kg)
- Gross weight: 732 lb (332 kg)

Performance

- Stall speed: 42 mph (68 km/h, 37 kn)
- Never exceed speed: 129 mph (207 km/h, 112 kn)
- g limits: +5.86 -3.86
- Maximum glide ratio: 31.5:1 at 47 mph (76 km/h; 41 kn)
- Rate of sink: 130 ft/min (.66 m/s) at 45 mph (72 km/h; 39 kn)
- Wing loading: 5.6 lb/sq ft (27.5 kg/m^{2})

== See also ==
Aircraft of comparable role, configuration, and era

- Martin M-1 - glider with the same designation

Related lists

- List of gliders
