= MNL =

MNL may refer to:

- Manila, Philippines
  - Ninoy Aquino International Airport
- Mouvement national lycéen, French National High School Movement, split from Union Nationale Lycéenne
- MNL48, Filipino idol girl group
- Myanmar National League, Myanmar (Burma)'s national football league
- Multinomial logit, a generalized logistic regression model
- National Archives of Hungary (Hungarian: Magyar Nemzeti Levéltár)
