= JSP model 1 architecture =

Java Web application design model

In the design of Java Web applications, there are two commonly used design models, referred to as Model 1 and Model 2.

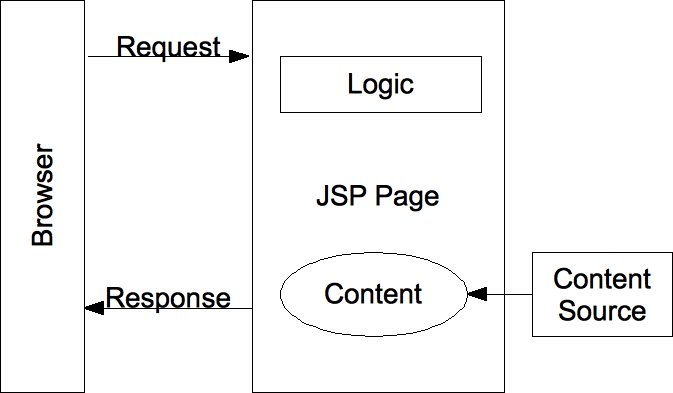
A simplified diagram of a Model 1 implementation.

In Model 1, a request is made to a JSP or servlet and then that JSP or servlet handles all responsibilities for the request, including processing the request, validating data, handling the business logic, and generating a response. The Model 1 architecture is commonly used in smaller, simple task applications due to its ease of development.

Although conceptually simple, this architecture is not conducive to large-scale application development because, inevitably, a great deal of functionality is duplicated in each JSP. Also, the Model 1 architecture unnecessarily ties together the business logic and presentation logic of the application. Combining business logic with presentation logic makes it hard to introduce a new 'view' or access point in an application. For example, in addition to an HTML interface, you might want to include a Wireless Markup Language (WML) interface for wireless access. In this case, using Model 1 will unnecessarily require the duplication of the business logic with each instance of the presentation code.
