= M1 heavy tractor =

Civilian tracked tractor adopted for military use

Tractor, heavy, M1
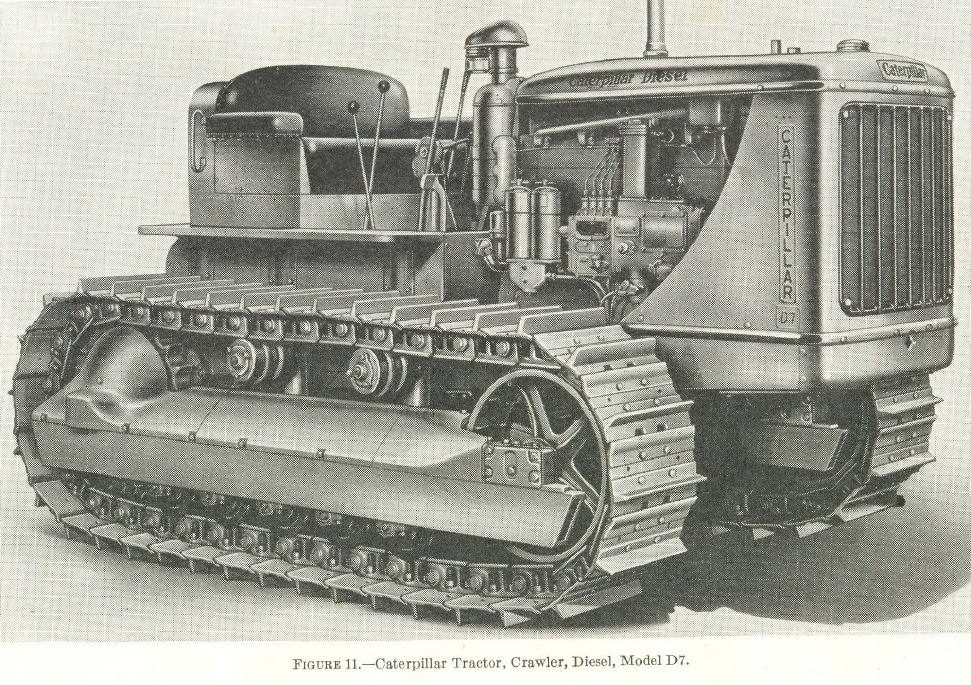
- Caterpillar tractor, crawler, diesel, model D7 from TB 5-9720-11, 1944
- Type: Heavy tractor
- Manufacturer: Caterpillar Tractor Co.
- Length: 194 in (4.93 m)
- Width: 98 in (2.49 m)
- Height: 108 in (2.74 m)
- Weight: 30,100 lb (13,653 kg)
- Propulsion: Caterpillar tracks
- Engine model: Caterpillar D7
- Gross power: 80 hp (60 kW)
- Drawbar pull: 21,350 lb (9,680 kg)
- Speed: 11 mph (18 km/h) Forward

M1 heavy tractor was a term used by the United States Army during World War II for several different models of "off the shelf" civilian tracked tractors adopted for military use. Under the Ordnance Department, these tractors were meant to tow artillery pieces, and were not equipped with blades like their Corps of Engineers counterparts. Later in the war, these tractors were replaced in the prime mover role by heavy trucks such as the Mack NO or purpose-built "high-speed tractors" such as the M4, M5, or M6. Some tractors were equipped with crane attachments for ammunition and material handling.

More than 1,000 were leased to the Soviet Union. They mostly used them to tow 122 mm, 152 mm, and even 203 mm guns. It saw good service as a prime mover for artillery.

== Variants ==
- Allis-Chalmers Model L
- G-022 Caterpillar Model 60
- G-89 Caterpillar RD7,
- G-98, G-107 Allis-Chalmers HD-10DW
- G-101 International Harvester TD-18
- G-126 Caterpillar D7
- G-153 Caterpillar D8

and perhaps others.

== Gallery ==
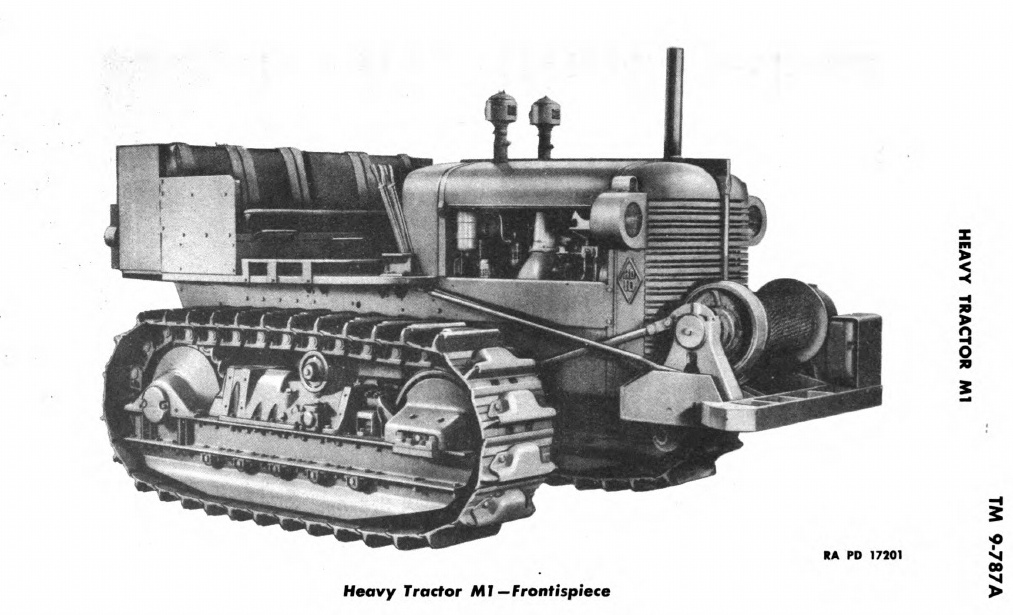
Allis-Chalmers tractor, crawler, diesel, model HD-10W from TM 9-787A

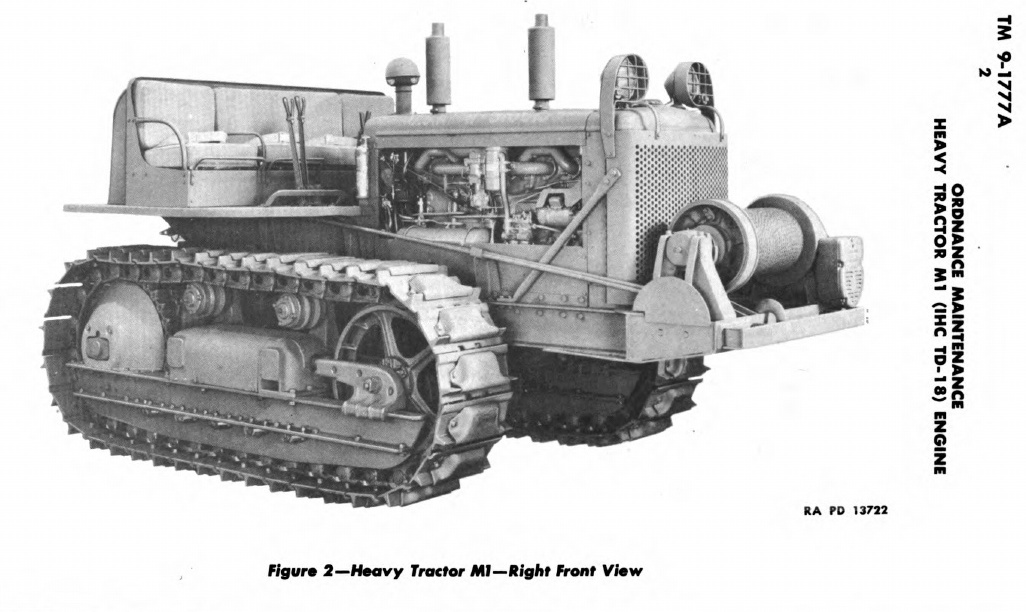
International heavy tractor, crawler, diesel, model TD-18 from TM 9-1777A

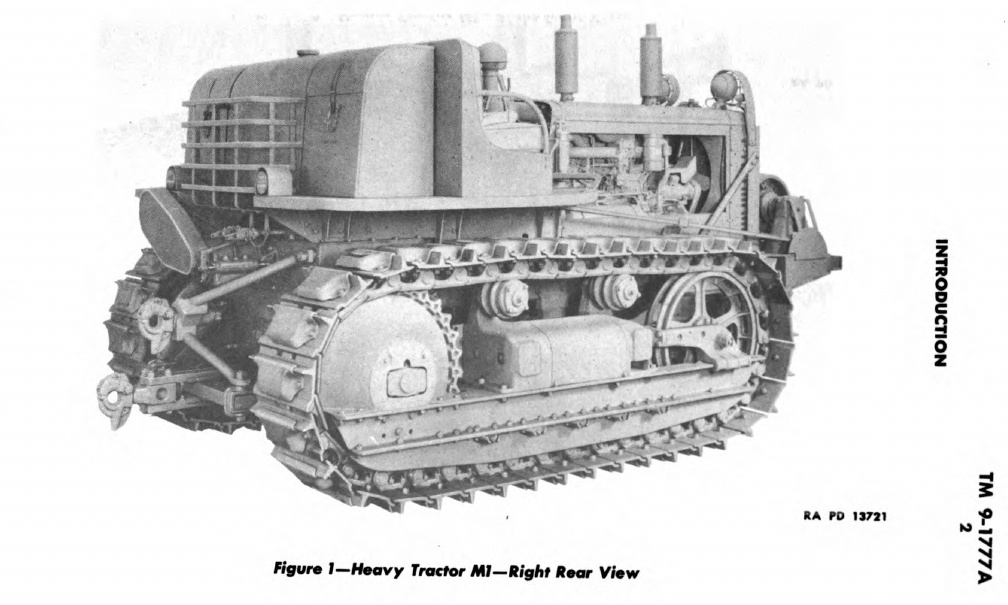
International heavy tractor, crawler, diesel, model TD-18.second image from TM 9-1777A

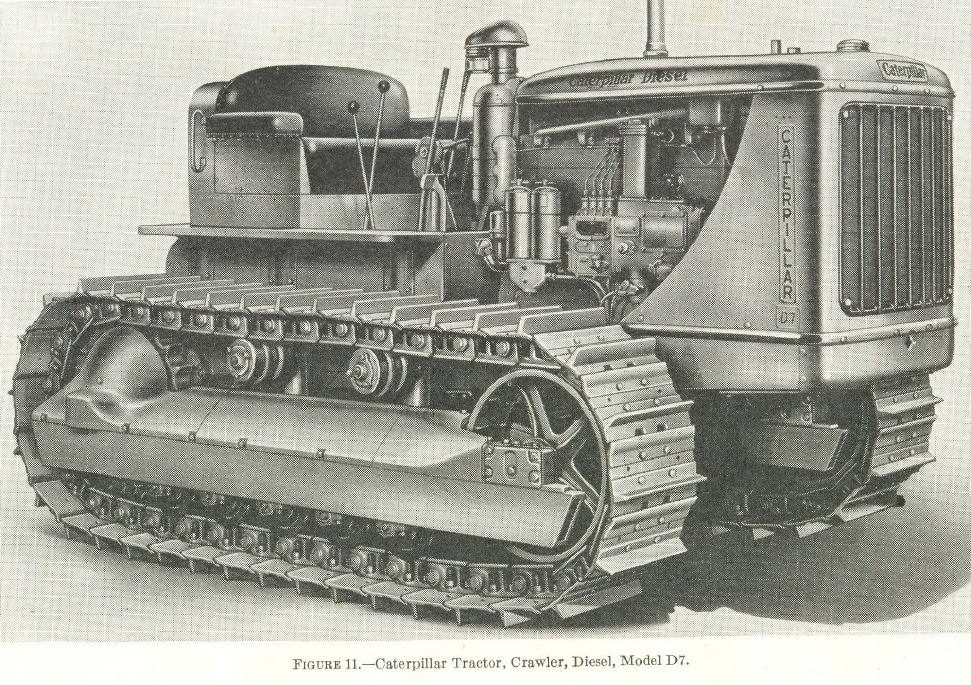
Caterpillar tractor, crawler, diesel, model D7 from TB 5-9720-11, 1944

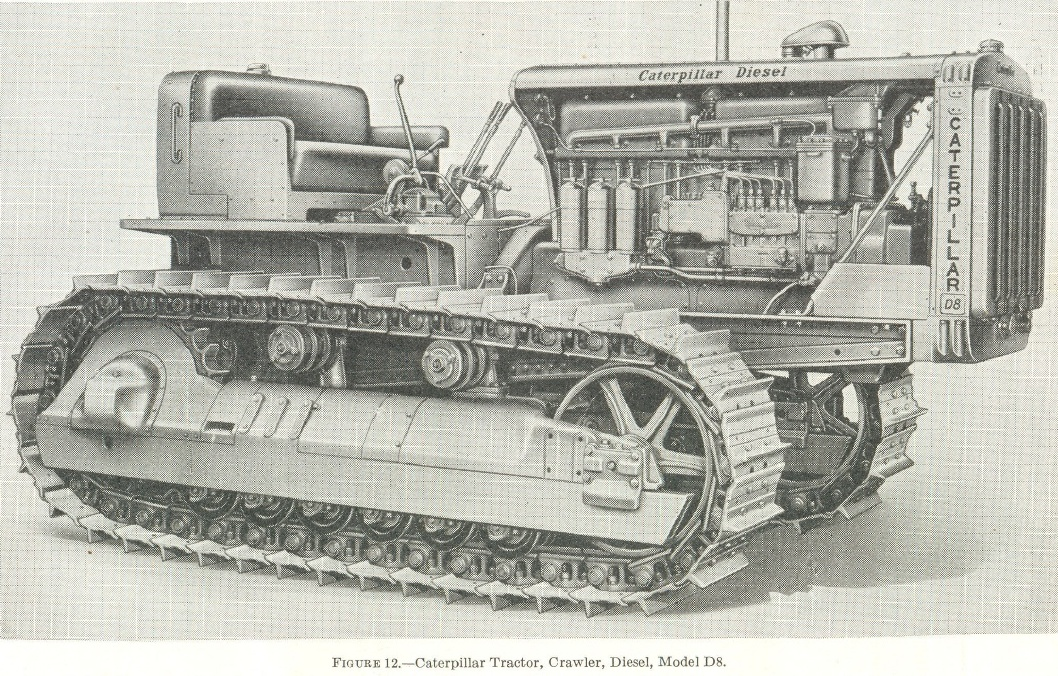
Caterpillar tractor, crawler, diesel, model D8 from TB 5-9720-11, 1944

== See also ==
- List of U.S. military vehicles by model number
- List of U.S. military vehicles by supply catalog designation
- M1 medium tractor
- M1 light tractor
- M2 light tractor
- Allis-Chalmers (See Military Machinery)
