= Martin M-1 =

American glider

M-1

General information
- Type: Glider
- National origin: United States
- Designer: Volmer Jensen
- Status: Production completed
- Primary user: Jim Martin
- Number built: 1

History
- Manufactured: 1939
- First flight: 1939

The Martin M-1 was an American gull winged, single-seat glider that was designed and built by Volmer Jensen in 1939.

== Design and development ==
Jim Martin contracted Jensen to design and built him a glider for contest flying just before the Second World War. Jensen completed the aircraft in 1939.

The aircraft was constructed with a wooden structure and covered in doped aircraft fabric covering. The cantilever gull-style wing employed a NACA 4400 series airfoil. The tail was a conventional low-tail design and featured strut-bracing. The M-1 was registered as an Experimental - Amateur-built aircraft and was not type certified.

== Operational history ==
Martin flew the aircraft in a number of US Nationals, as did a later owner of the M-1, Emil Lehecka. While Lehecka owned it the aircraft picked up the nickname of the Whatsit. By the 1970s the aircraft was owned by Francis Kalinowsky and was based at the Circle X airport in Florida. At that time it was reportedly in good repair and was well maintained.

The aircraft was removed from the Federal Aviation Administration registry and its whereabouts are unknown.

== Specifications (M-1) ==
Data from Soaring

General characteristics

- Crew: one
- Wingspan: 48 ft 0 in (14.63 m)
- Wing area: 180 sq ft (17 m^{2})
- Aspect ratio: 12.8:1
- Airfoil: NACA 4400 series
- Empty weight: 438 lb (199 kg)
- Gross weight: 631 lb (286 kg)

Performance

- Maximum glide ratio: 28 at 50 mph (80 km/h)
- Rate of sink: 132 ft/min (0.67 m/s) at 40 mph (64 km/h)

== See also ==
Aircraft of comparable role, configuration, and era

- Matteson M-1 - glider with the same designation

Related lists

- List of gliders
