= L class =

L class or Class L may refer to:

== Rail transport ==
- Barry Railway Class L, 0-6-4T steam tank locomotives
- Commonwealth Railways L class, 2-8-2 steam locomotives
- Highland Railway L Class, 4-4-0 steam locomotives
- Maine Central class L 4-4-0, steam locomotives
- NBR Class L, 4-4-2T steam locomotives
- NZR L class, 2-4-0T steam locomotives
- LB&SCR L class, 4-6-4 steam tank locomotives
- South Australian Railways L class, 4-4-0 steam locomotives
- Tasmanian Government Railways L class, 2-6-2+2-6-2 steam locomotives
- Victorian Railways L class, electric locomotives
- Victorian Railways L class (1859), 2-4-0ST steam locomotives
- WAGR L class, light axle load steam locomotives
- WAGR L class (diesel)
- L-class Melbourne tram
- L-class Sydney tram

== Ship types ==
- L-class destroyer (disambiguation), several classes
- L-class submarine (disambiguation), several classes

== Other uses ==
- L-class blimp, airships built for the U.S. Navy
- L-class star, a type of brown dwarfs
- L (complexity), a complexity class in computational complexity theory
- L class, indicates "Miscellaneous" when used in the fifth letter notation on the NYSE ticker symbol.

== See also ==
- Class 1 (disambiguation)
- Class I (disambiguation)
- I class (disambiguation)
- L (disambiguation)
- L type (disambiguation) or Type-L
