= Category I =

Category I can refer to:

- Category I New Testament manuscripts - Alexandrian
- Category-I Miniratna public sector undertakings (India)
- Category I measurement - performed on circuits not directly connected to MAINS
- Category I (a/b) protected areas (IUCN) - Strict Nature Reserve (Ia)/Wilderness Area (Ib)

== See also ==
- Class I (disambiguation) - class/category equivalence (for labeling)
- Type 1 (disambiguation) - type/category equivalence (for labeling)
- Group 1 (disambiguation) - group/category equivalence (for labeling)
- Category 1 (disambiguation) - Roman/Arabic numbering equivalence
