= L (disambiguation) =

L, or l, is the twelfth letter of the English alphabet.

L or l may also refer to:

- Left (direction)
- L, length in general (often the longest dimension, as opposed to width, height, or depth)
  - Horse length, used in horse racing
  - Boat length, used in rowing
- L, l or ℓ, litre, a unit of volume
- l, abbreviation for liquid
- L, the Roman numeral representing the number 50
- Loser (hand gesture)

== Finance ==
- Ancient Roman libra (translated as "pound"), a weight measure with derivative units denoted with "L" or a derived character:
  - Pound (currency), a number of currencies from the British Empire, abbreviated £ or (historically) "l", "L", or "$\mathfrak{L}$". (Some fonts use a two-bar version resembling the lira sign ₤.)
  - Livre (disambiguation), a number of currencies from the French Empire, with the original abbreviated "£", "₶", or "lt"
  - Lira, a number of currencies from Italy and the Ottoman Empire, abbreviated as ₤
- Loews Corporation, by NYSE ticker symbol
- Miscellaneous, when used as the fifth letter or behind-the-dot notation on the NASDAQ and NYSE ticker symbols

== Science and technology ==
- Low-pressure area, in meteorology
- Canon L lens, in photography
- L or $\mathcal{L}$, notation for a Lagrangian (disambiguation), in math and physics
- L band (disambiguation), in telecommunications

=== Mathematics and computing ===
- $L$, constructible universe, a particular class of sets which can be described entirely in terms of simpler sets
- L-function, meromorphic function on the complex plane
- $\mathcal{L}$, Laplace transform
- $\mathcal{L}$, likelihood function
- ℓ^{p} space, the space of sequences with a finite p-norm
- L^{p} space, a function space defined using a natural generalization of the p-norm for finite-dimensional vector spaces
- L, symbol for basic provability logic
- L (complexity), a complexity class in computational complexity theory
- L-notation, used for running times of subexponential algorithms
- Android L, code name for Android Lollipop

=== Physics and astronomy ===
- L, Langmuir (unit), a unit of exposure to a surface, used in ultra-high vacuum surface physics
- ℓ, azimuthal quantum number
- Angular momentum
- Inductance, the ratio of the magnetic flux to the current in an electrical circuit
- Latent heat
- Mean free path, the average distance traveled by a moving particle between successive collisions
- Luminosity
- Class L, a stellar classification
- Galactic longitude (l), in the galactic coordinate system

=== Chemistry and life sciences ===
- Avogadro constant, in some German scientific literature
- Leucine, an α-amino acid
- l-, prefix indicating a levorotary compound
- L-, prefix indicating of absolute configuration
  - L-amino acid
- Lewisite, a blister agent
- Carl Linnaeus, in botanist author citations (L.)
- Haplogroup L (Y-DNA)
- Vertebra in the lumbar region of the spinal cord
- ATC code L Antineoplastic and immunomodulating agents, a section of the Anatomical Therapeutic Chemical Classification System

== Arts and media ==
- L – A Mathemagical Adventure, a 1984 computer game
- L (film), a 2012 Greek film
- L, production code for the 1965 Doctor Who serial The Rescue
- Big L (disambiguation), a musician, song, or radio station
- L, a rating of the Brazilian advisory rating system
- L (Death Note), a character from the Death Note manga and anime series

=== Language and literature ===
- L (novel), a 1999 novel by Erlend Loe
- [ʟ], the velar lateral approximant (IPA notation)
- [l], the alveolar lateral approximant (IPA notation)
- The Cyrillic palochka (Ӏ)
- Ḷ, a letter derived from L with a diacritical dot below
- The "low" or common language in a diglossia
- $\mathfrak{L}$, a siglum for the Vetus Latina version of the Bible
- Leaf (books) ("l." or ℓ), an alternate numbering for books, in contrast to "p." for pages
- Specification for a line of text, for example "l. 3" is the third line of text

=== Music ===
- L (French singer), French singer-songwriter
- L (entertainer), vocalist of Korean boy band Infinite
- L Marshall, British singer credited as L on the Wretch 32 song "Traktor"
- Lesure Number, music catalogue identifier for the compositions of Claude Debussy
- L Number, classification of the compositions of Franz Benda according to the catalogue of Douglas A. Lee

==== Albums ====
- L (Godley & Creme album) (1978)
- L (Ayumi Hamasaki EP) (2010)
- L (Steve Hillage album) (1976)
- L (Candy Lo EP) (2008)
- L (Moe album) (2000)

== Vehicles and transportation ==
- L-plate, a plate for learning drivers under instruction
- Nissan L engine
- L, the low gear of an automatic transmission
- L class (disambiguation), types of trains, ships, and other things

=== Trains and railroads ===
- L (Los Angeles Railway)
- Chicago "L", a rapid transit system in Chicago
- L (New York City Subway service)
- L Line (Los Angeles Metro)
- L (SEPTA Metro)
- Transilien Line L, a line of the Paris transport network
- The official West Japan Railway Company service symbol for:
  - Maizuru Line
  - Uno Line
- L Taraval (San Francisco Muni)
- LB&SCR L class, a British tank locomotive on the London, Brighton, and South Coast Railway

== Places ==
- L, the vehicle registration prefix of Surabaya, Indonesia
- L postcode area, for Liverpool
- L Island, former name for Scawfell Island, Queensland, Australia
- L, the military time zone code for UTC+11:00

== Other uses ==
- Lucius (praenomen), a Roman praenomen
- L. Inc., California-based corporation that makes organic personal care products
- Liberals (Sweden), a political party in Sweden

== See also ==
- El (disambiguation)
- Lambda (disambiguation)
