= Walnut =

Nut of any tree of the genus Juglans

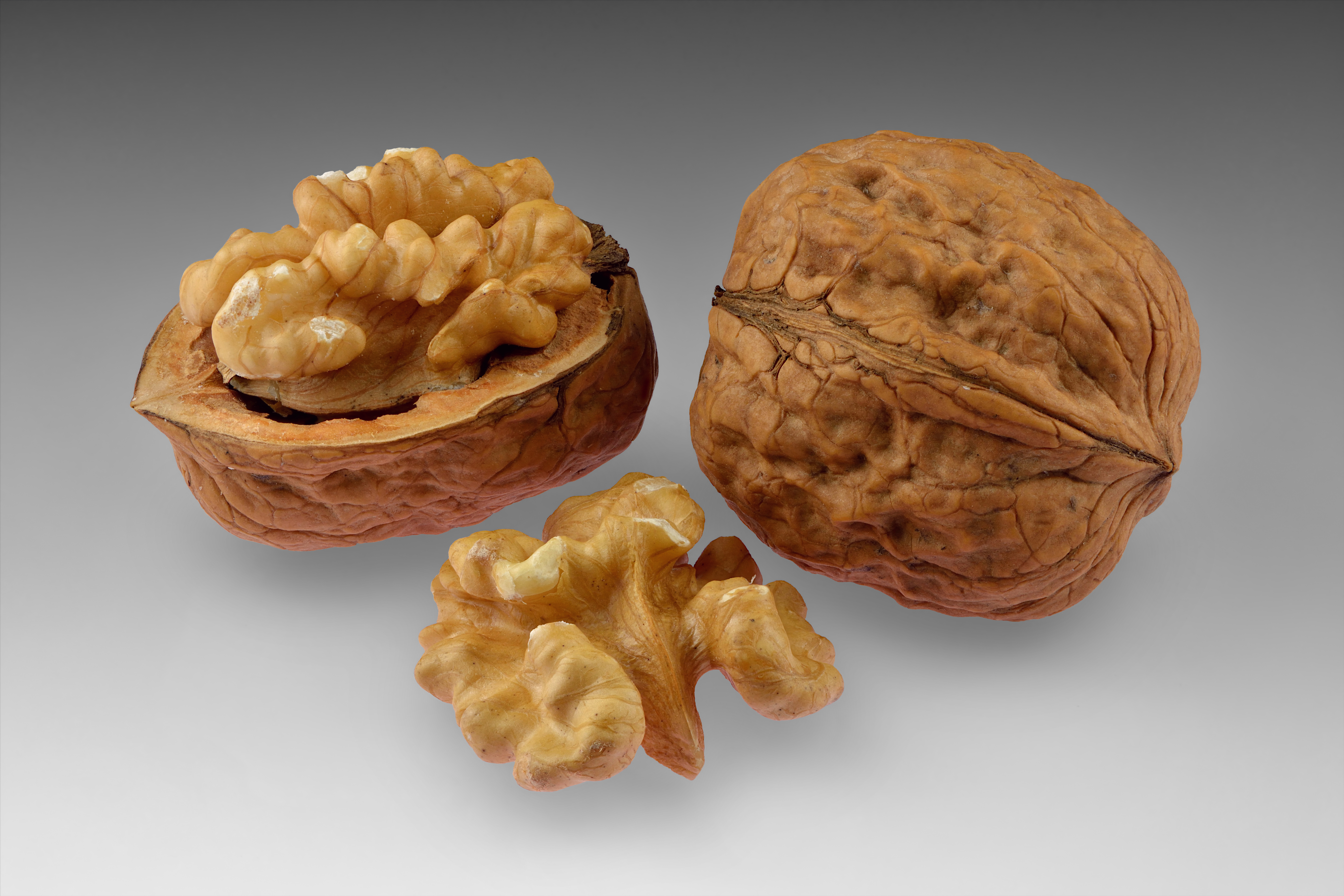
Walnuts

A walnut is the edible seed of any tree of the genus Juglans (family Juglandaceae), most often the Persian or English walnut, Juglans regia. They are accessory fruit because the outer covering of the fruit is technically an involucre and thus not morphologically part of the carpel; this means it cannot be a drupe but is instead a drupe-like nut.

After full ripening, the shell is discarded, and the kernel is eaten. Nuts of the eastern black walnut (Juglans nigra) and butternuts (Juglans cinerea) are less commonly consumed.

== Description ==
Walnuts are the round, single-seed stone fruits of the walnut tree. They ripen between September and November in the northern hemisphere. The brown, wrinkly walnut shell is enclosed in a husk. Shells of walnuts commercially available usually have two segments (but three- or four-segment shells can also form). During the ripening process, the husk becomes brittle and the shell hard. The shell encloses the kernel or meat, which is usually in two halves separated by a membranous partition. The seed kernels – commonly available as shelled walnuts – are enclosed in a brown seed coat which contains antioxidants. The antioxidants protect the oil-rich seed from atmospheric oxygen, preventing rancidity.

Walnut trees are late to grow leaves, typically not doing so until more than halfway through the spring.

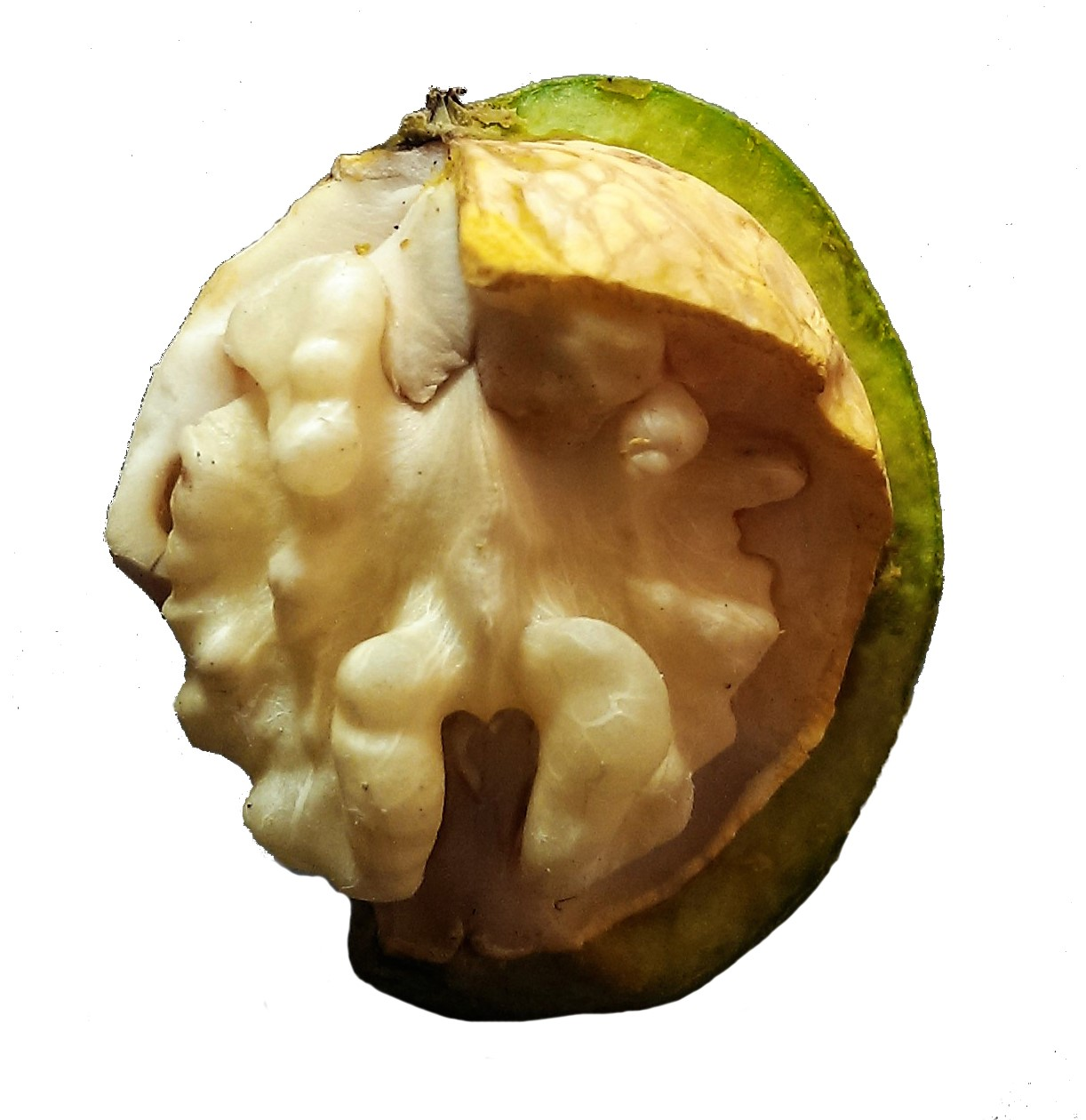
Inside of a walnut in growth

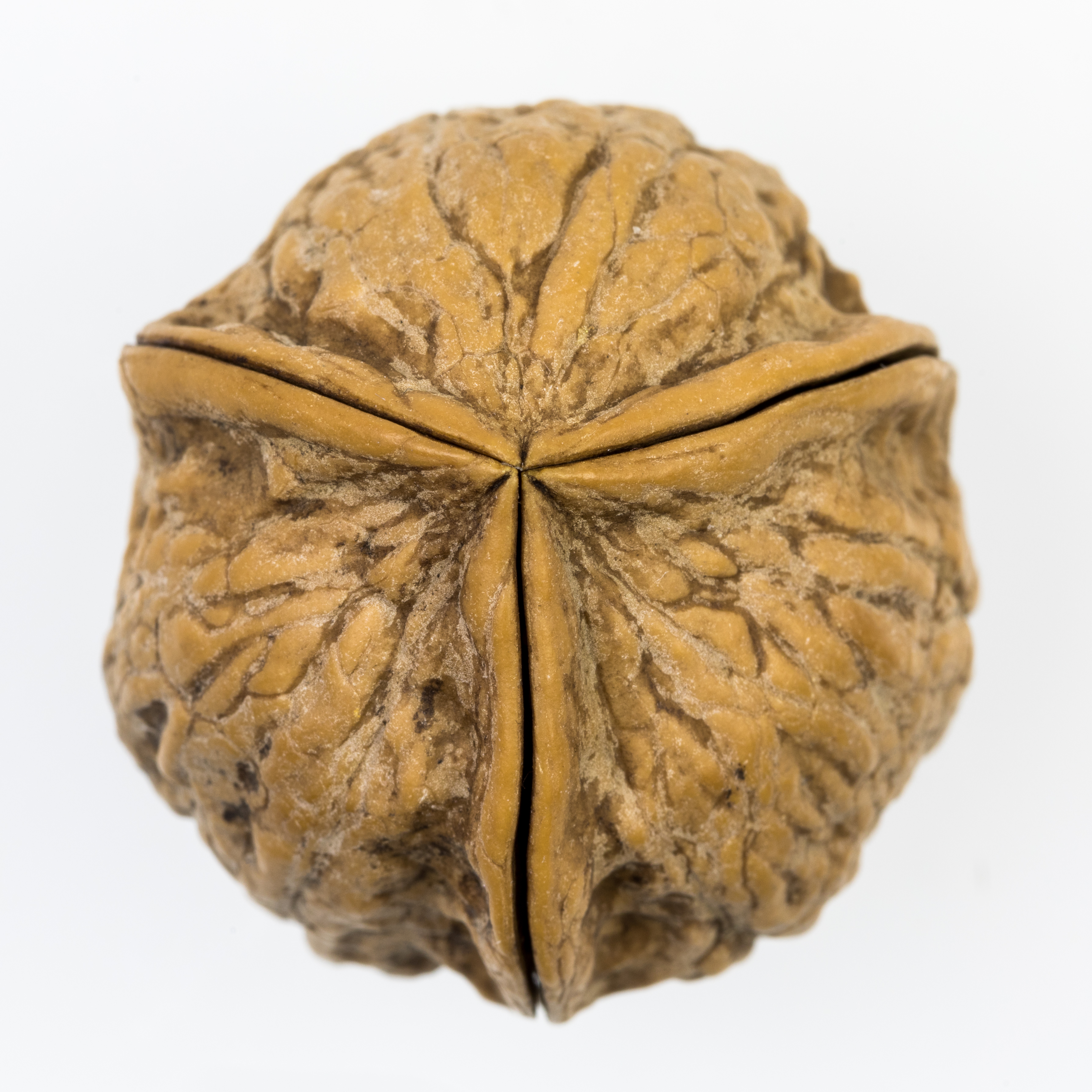
Three-segment walnut

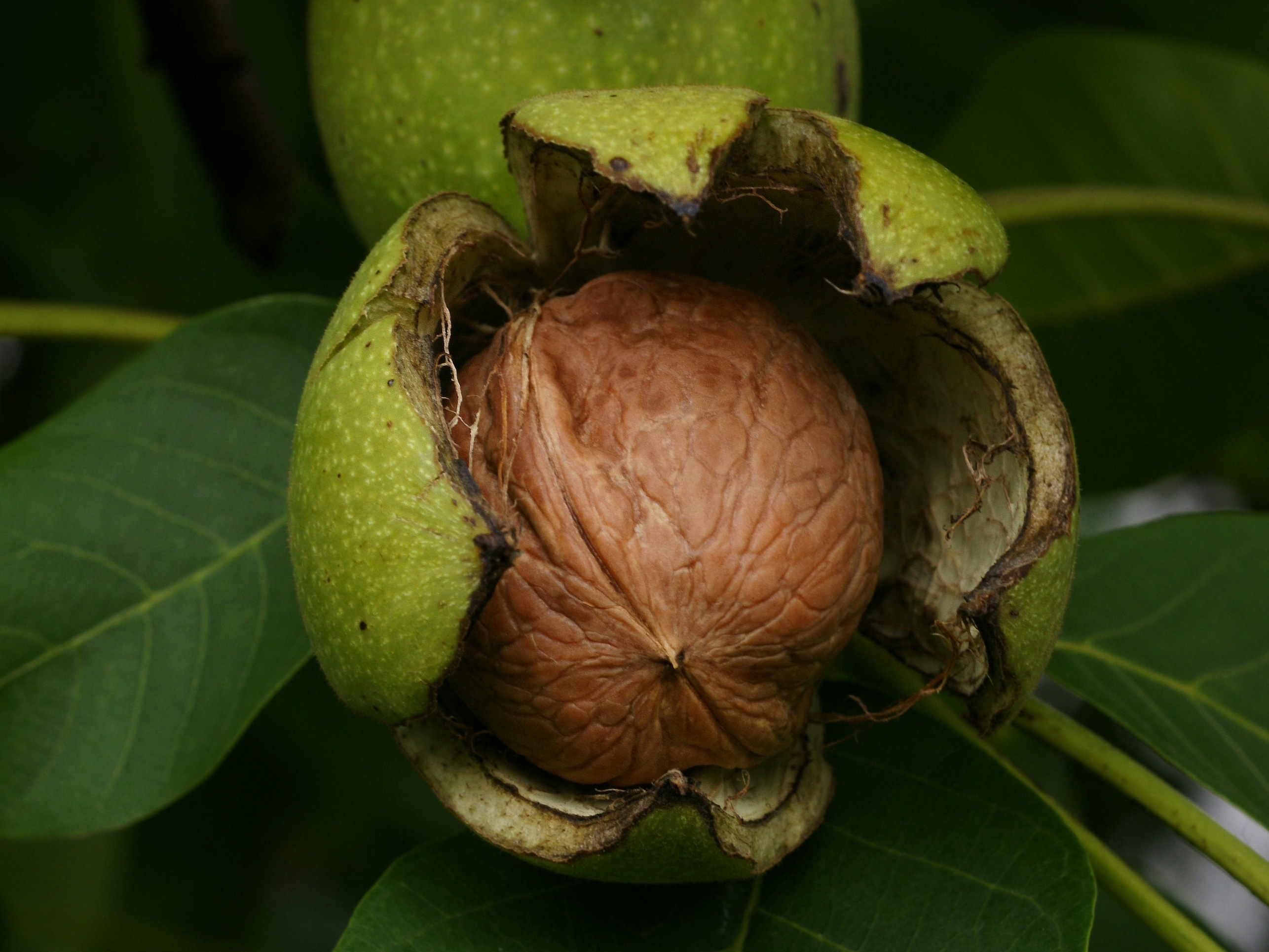
Walnut shell inside its green husk

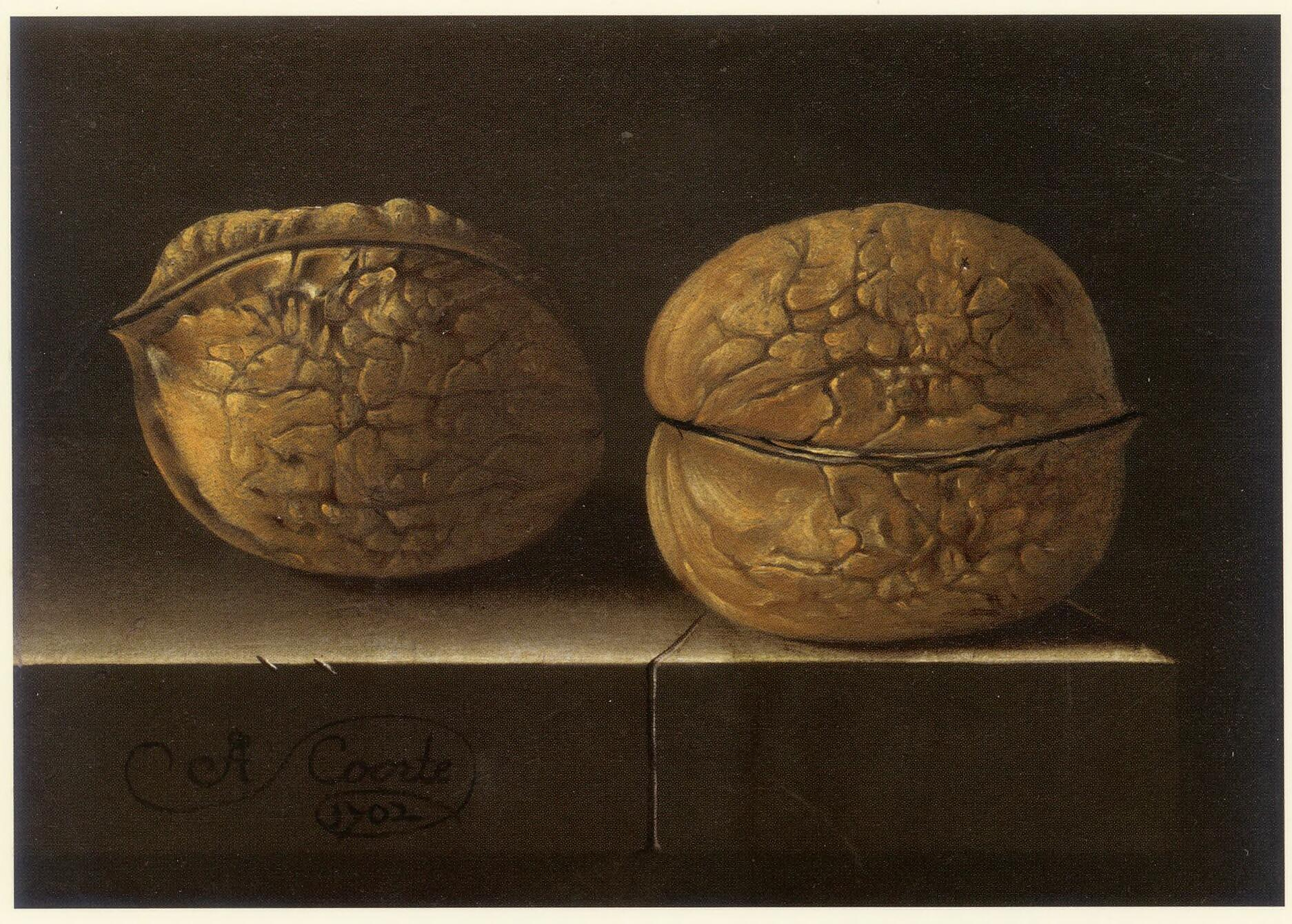
Artistic depiction of two walnuts (Adriaen Coorte, 1702)

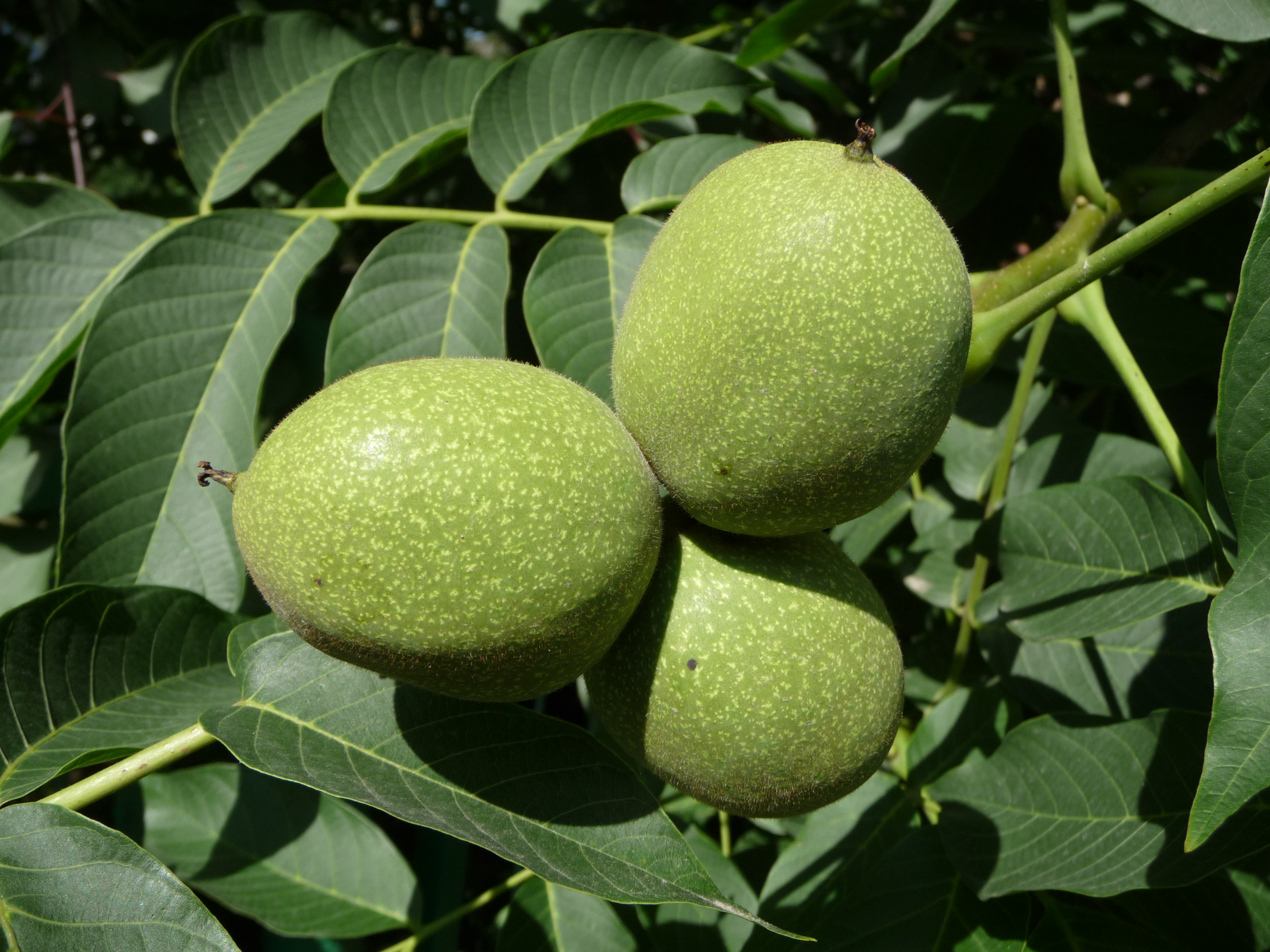
Common walnut in growth

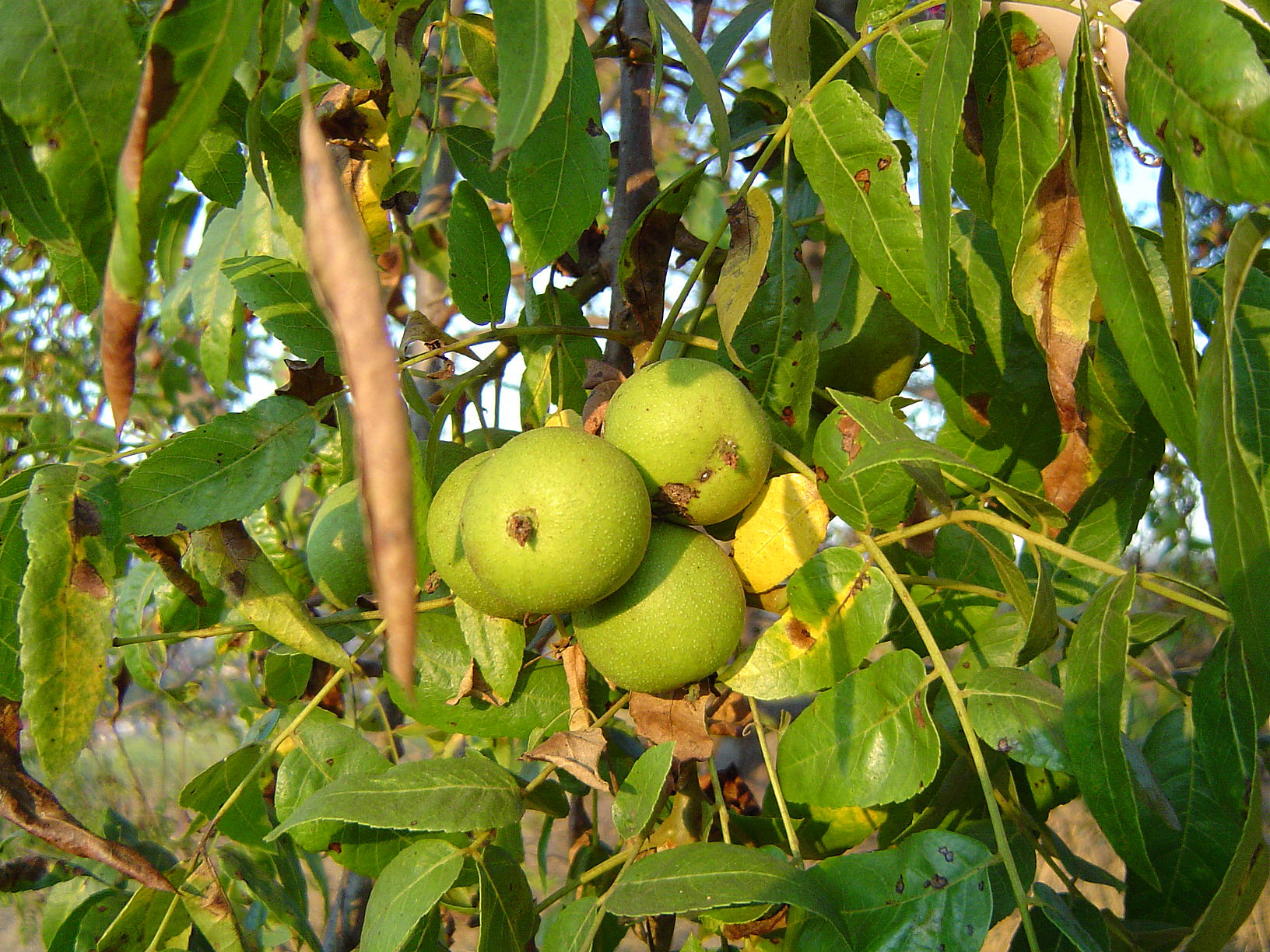
California black walnut in growth

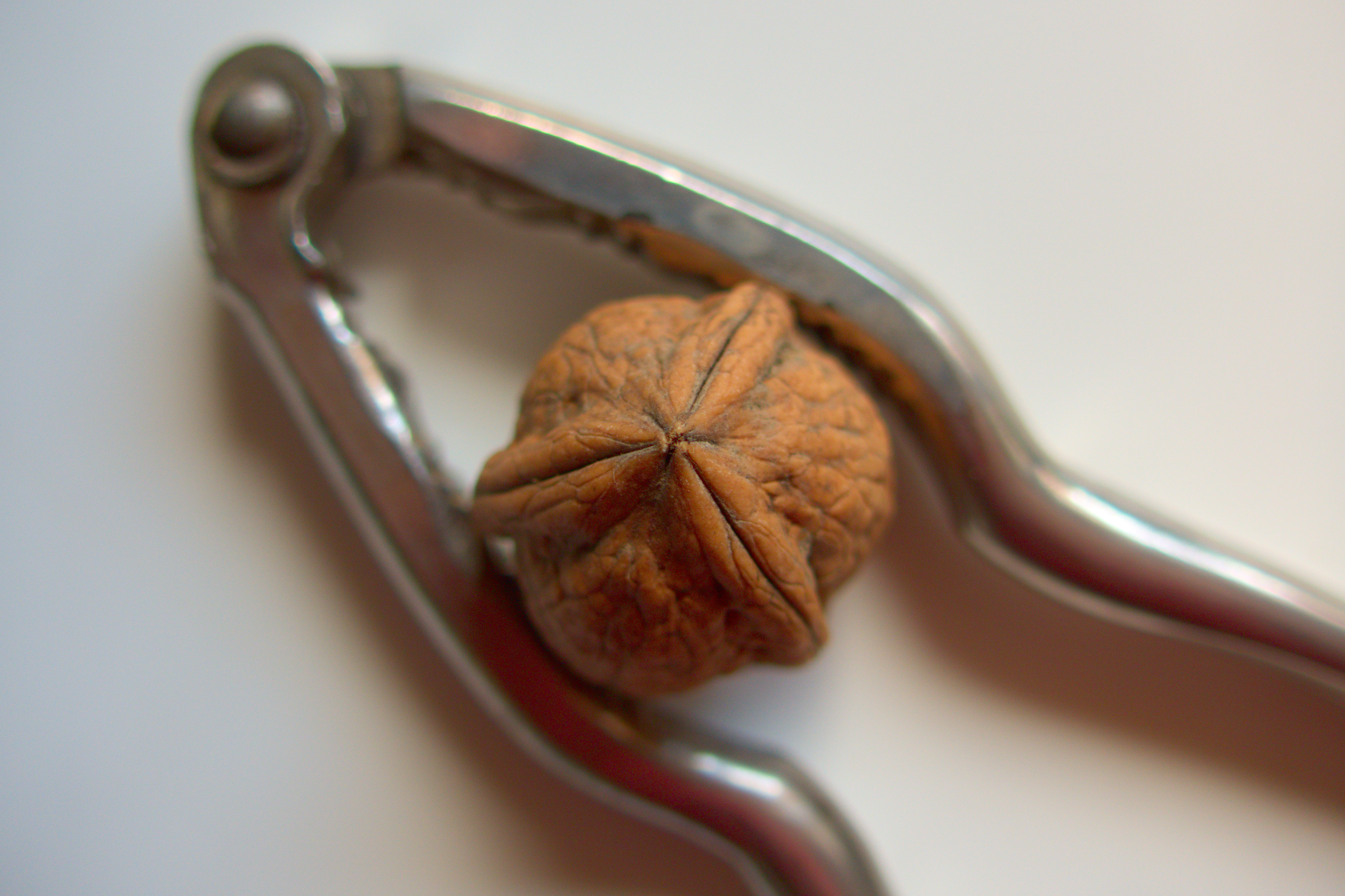
Walnut in shell and a nutcracker utensil used to break the shell

Video of cracking a walnut

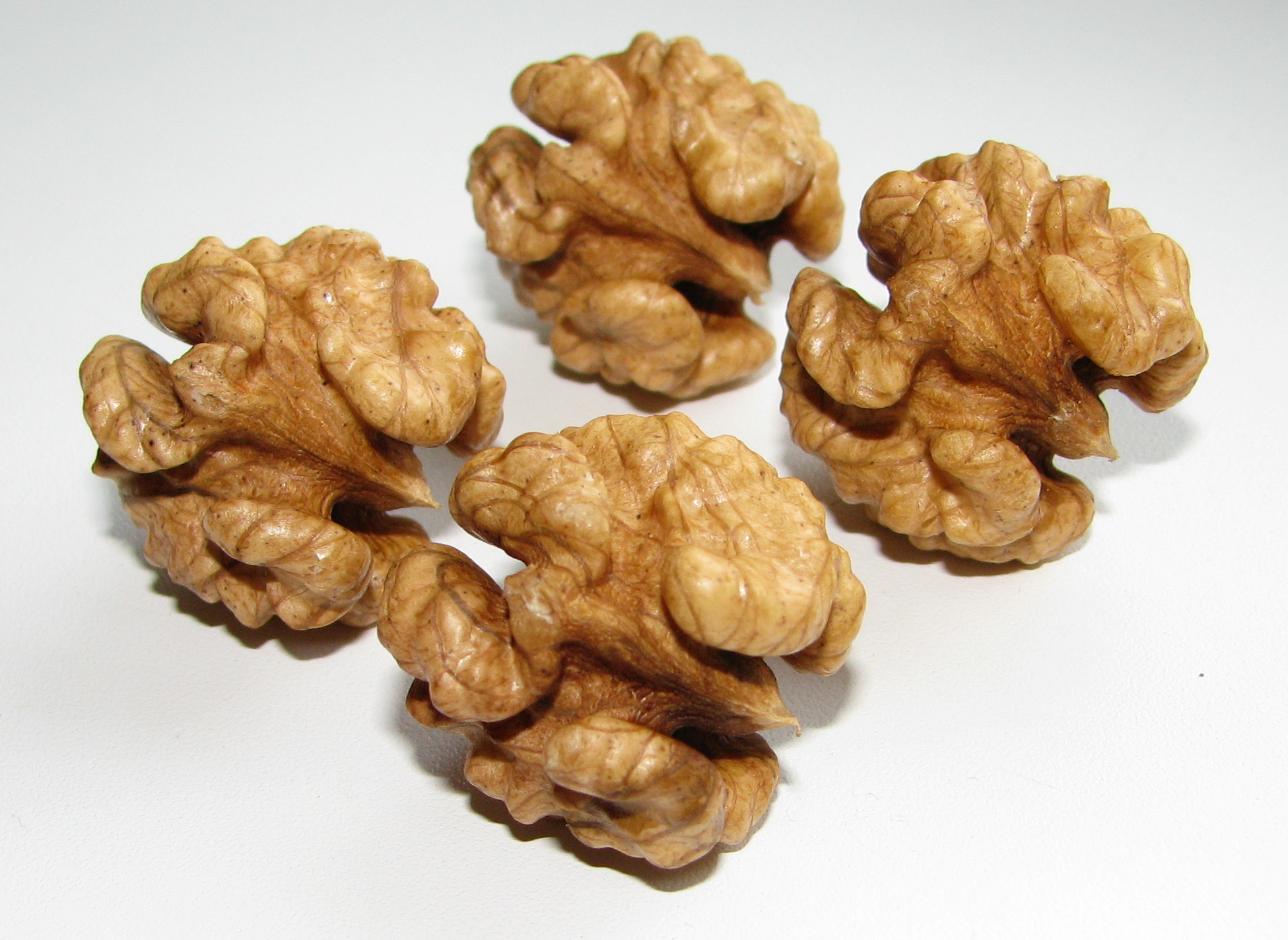
Walnut kernels

=== Chemistry ===
Walnut hulls contain diverse phytochemicals, such as polyphenols, that stain hands and can cause skin irritation. Seven phenolic compounds, including ferulic acid, vanillic acid, coumaric acid, syringic acid, myricetin, and juglone, were identified in walnut husks; juglone had concentrations of 2–4% fresh weight.

Walnuts also contain the ellagitannin, pedunculagin. Regiolone has been isolated with juglone, betulinic acid and sitosterol from the stem bark of J. regia.

== Species ==
The three species of walnuts most commonly grown for their seeds are the Persian (or English) walnut (J. regia), originating from Iran, the black walnut (J. nigra) – native to eastern North America – and the Japanese walnut, also known as the heartnut (J. ailantifolia). Other species include J. californica, the California black walnut (often used as a rootstock for commercial propagation of J. regia), J. cinerea (butternuts), and J. major, the Arizona walnut. Other sources list J. californica californica as native to southern California, and Juglans californica hindsii, or just J. hindsii, as native to northern California; in at least one case, these are given as "geographic variants" instead of subspecies (Botanica).

Numerous walnut cultivars have been developed commercially, which are nearly all hybrids of the Persian walnut.

== Cultivation ==
=== History ===
During the Ottoman and Byzantine era, the walnut was also known by the name "royal nut". An article on walnut tree cultivation in the Iberian Peninsula is included in Ibn al-'Awwam's 12th-century Book on Agriculture.

The wal element in the name is Germanic and means foreign, especially in the sense of Latin or non-Germanic. Compare, for example, Wales, Walloons, Wallachia. The wal element is present in other Germanic-language words for the same nut, such as: German Walnuss, Dutch walnoot, Danish valnød, and Swedish valnöt.

=== Storage ===
Walnuts, like other tree nuts, must be processed and stored properly. Poor storage makes walnuts susceptible to insect and fungal mould infestations; the latter produces aflatoxin – a potent carcinogen. A batch that contains mold-infested walnuts should be entirely discarded.

The ideal temperature for the extended storage of walnuts is −3 to 0 °C (27 to 32 °F) with low humidity for industrial and home storage. However, such refrigeration technologies are unavailable in developing countries where walnuts are produced in large quantities; walnuts are best stored below 25 °C (77 °F) with low humidity. Temperatures above 30 °C (86 °F) and humidity levels above 70 percent can lead to rapid and high spoilage losses. Above 75 percent humidity threshold, fungal moulds that release aflatoxin can form.

=== Cultivars ===
- Ashley
- Chandler
- Cisco
- Dawson
- Eureka
- Feradam
- Ferbel
- Ferjean
- Fernette
- Fernor
- Ferouette
- Forde
- Franquette
- Grandjean
- Germisara
- Gillet
- Hansen
- Hartley
- Howard
- Hu
- Ivanhoe
- Jupanesti
- Lara
- Livermore
- Marbot
- Mayette
- Meylanaise
- Paradox
- Parisienne
- Payne
- Poe
- Robert Livermore
- Rita
- Ronde de Montignac
- Royal
- Serr
- Sexton
- Solano
- Sunland
- Tehama
- Tulare
- Valcor
- Vina
- Wilson's Wonder
- Yolo

== Production ==
Walnut production 2023, million of tonnes
China	1.40
United States	0.75
Iran	0.38
Turkey	0.36
Mexico	0.17
World	4.0
Source: FAOSTAT of the United Nations

In 2023, world production of walnuts (in shell) was four million tonnes, with China contributing 35% of the total (table). Other significant producers (in the order of decreasing harvest) were the United States, Iran, and Turkey. The Livermore cultivar is a red-kernel English walnut developed in California and marketed as a specialty variety.

Walnut yield

Production of walnuts

== Nutrition ==
Walnut, English
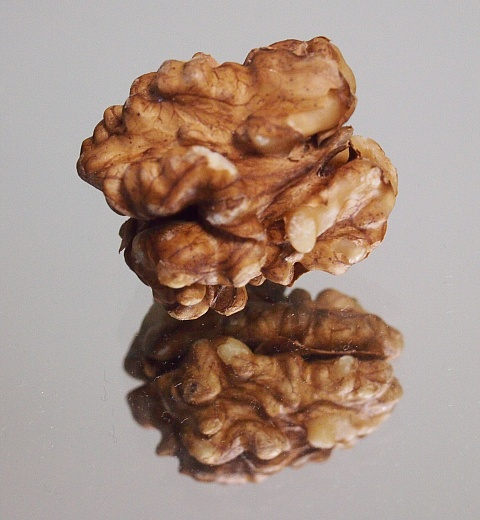
- Walnut kernel, halves

Nutritional value per 100 grams
- Energy: 2,738 kJ (654 kcal)
- Carbohydrates: 13.71 g
- Starch: 0.06 g
- Sugars: 2.61 g
- Dietary fiber: 6.7 g
- Fat: 65.21 g
- Saturated: 6.126 g
- Monounsaturated: 8.933 g
- Polyunsaturated omega−3 omega−6: 47.174 g 9 g 38 g
- Protein: 15.23 g
Vitamins and minerals
Vitamins	Quantity %DV^{†}
Vitamin A equiv. beta-Carotene lutein zeaxanthin	0% 1 μg 0% 12 μg 9 μg
Vitamin A	20 IU
Thiamine (B1)	28% 0.341 mg
Riboflavin (B2)	12% 0.15 mg
Niacin (B3)	7% 1.125 mg
Pantothenic acid (B5)	11% 0.570 mg
Vitamin B6	32% 0.537 mg
Folate (B9)	25% 98 μg
Vitamin B12	0% 0 μg
Vitamin C	1% 1.3 mg
Vitamin E	5% 0.7 mg
Vitamin K	2% 2.7 μg
Minerals	Quantity %DV^{†}
Calcium	8% 98 mg
Iron	16% 2.91 mg
Magnesium	38% 158 mg
Manganese	148% 3.414 mg
Phosphorus	28% 346 mg
Potassium	15% 441 mg
Sodium	0% 2 mg
Zinc	28% 3.09 mg
- Other constituents: Quantity
- Water: 4.07 g
- Link to Full USDA Database Entry
- ^{†}Percentages estimated using US recommendations for adults, except for potassium, which is estimated based on expert recommendation from the National Academies.

English (or Persian) walnuts without shells are 4% water, 15% protein, 65% fat, and 14% carbohydrates, including 7% dietary fiber (table). In a reference amount of 100 g (3.5 oz), walnuts provide 654 kilocalories (2,740 kJ) and rich contents (20% or more of the Daily Value, DV) of several dietary minerals, particularly manganese at 148% DV, along with significant amounts of B vitamins (table).

Unlike most nuts, which are high in monounsaturated fatty acids, walnut oil is composed largely of polyunsaturated fatty acids (72% of total fats), particularly alpha-linolenic acid (14%) and linoleic acid (58%), although it does contain oleic acid as 13% of total fats (table source).

=== Health claims ===
In 2004, the US Food and Drug Administration (FDA) provided a qualified health claim allowing products containing walnuts to state: "Supportive but not conclusive research shows that eating 1.5 ounces (43 g) per day of walnuts, as part of a low saturated fat and low cholesterol diet and not resulting in increased caloric intake, may reduce the risk of coronary heart disease." At the same time, the agency refused to authorize the claim that "Diets including walnuts can reduce the risk of heart disease" and in 2010, it sent a warning letter to Diamond Foods stating there is "not sufficient evidence to identify a biologically active substance in walnuts that reduces the risk of coronary heart disease."

In 2011, a scientific panel for the European Food Safety Authority recommended a health claim that "Walnuts contribute to the improvement of endothelium-dependent vasodilation" at a daily intake of 30 grams (1.1 oz); it also found that a cause and effect relationship did not exist between consuming walnuts and reduction of blood LDL-cholesterol levels. The recommended health claim was later authorized by the European Commission.

=== Research ===
Walnut supplementation and intake has no significant effect on blood pressure. The relationship between walnut consumption and cognitive health is inconclusive.

A 2026 systematic review found that walnut intake improves the lipid profile by significantly lowering low-density lipoprotein, total cholesterol and triglyceride levels.

== Allergy ==
Walnuts are among several tree nuts that have the potential to cause allergic reactions when eaten or if their oils contact the skin. Lifetime walnut allergies occur in about 0.4% of the population in Europe and the United States, although regional prevalence may vary according to availability of walnut products and consumption amounts. The prevalence of walnut and other nut allergies may be as high as 5% in American children.

Proteins implicated as allergens in walnut and tree nut allergic reactions include lipid transfer protein, 2S albumin, vicilin, legumin, and oleosin.

Symptoms of a walnut allergic reaction are abdominal pain, cramps, nausea, vomiting, difficulty swallowing, itching, shortness of breath, and potentially anaphylaxis, which may be fatal. Walnuts are considered to be a priority food allergen in Canada. Emergency treatment for anaphylaxis includes an injection of epinephrine, while milder symptoms are treated with an antihistamine. An allergic reaction to walnuts is best avoided by not eating or touching walnut products. Walnut allergy is usually lifelong and there is no cure.

Walnut allergy appears to have cross-reactivity with the allergies to pecans, cashews, and other tree nuts.

== Uses ==
=== Culinary ===
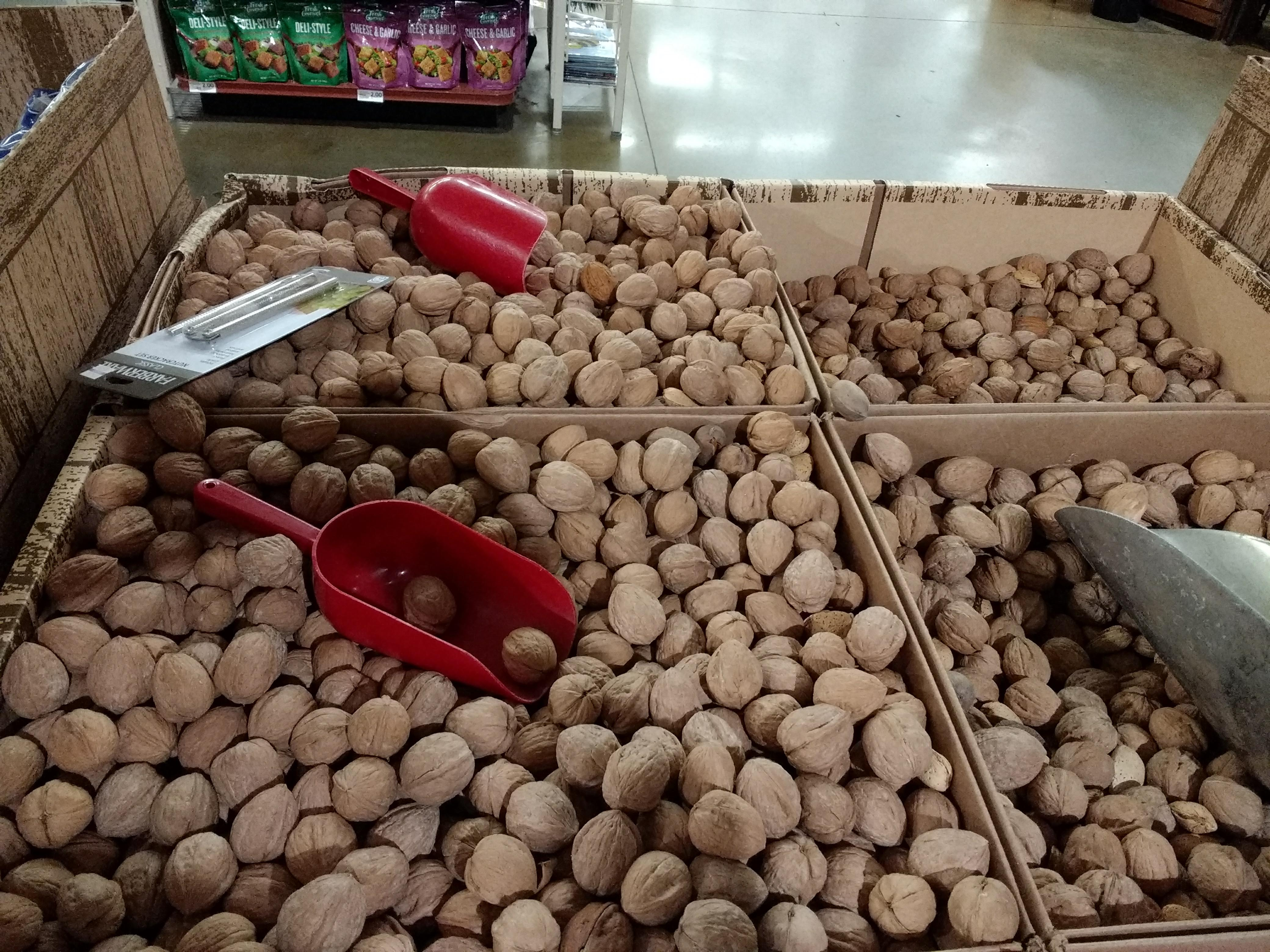
Walnuts in their shells available for sale in a supermarket in the United States

Walnut meats are available in two forms: in their shells or de-shelled. Due to processing, the meats may be whole, halved, or in smaller portions. All walnuts can be eaten on their own (raw, toasted, or pickled), or as part of a mix such as muesli, or as an ingredient of a dish: e.g. walnut soup, walnut pie, walnut coffee cake, banana cake, brownie, fudge. Walnuts are often candied or pickled. Pickled walnuts that are the whole fruit can be savory or sweet depending on the preserving solution.

Walnuts may be used as an ingredient in other foodstuffs. Walnut is an important ingredient in baklava, Circassian chicken, potica (a traditional festive pastry from Slovenia), satsivi (chicken in walnut sauce), tarator (a summer soup in Bulgarian cuisine), and poultry or meat ball stew from Iranian cuisine.

Walnuts are also popular as an ice cream topping, and walnut pieces are used as a garnish on some foods.

Nocino is a liqueur made from unripe green walnuts steeped in alcohol with syrup added.

Walnut oil is available commercially and is chiefly used as a food ingredient, particularly in salad dressings. It has a low smoke point, which limits its use for frying.

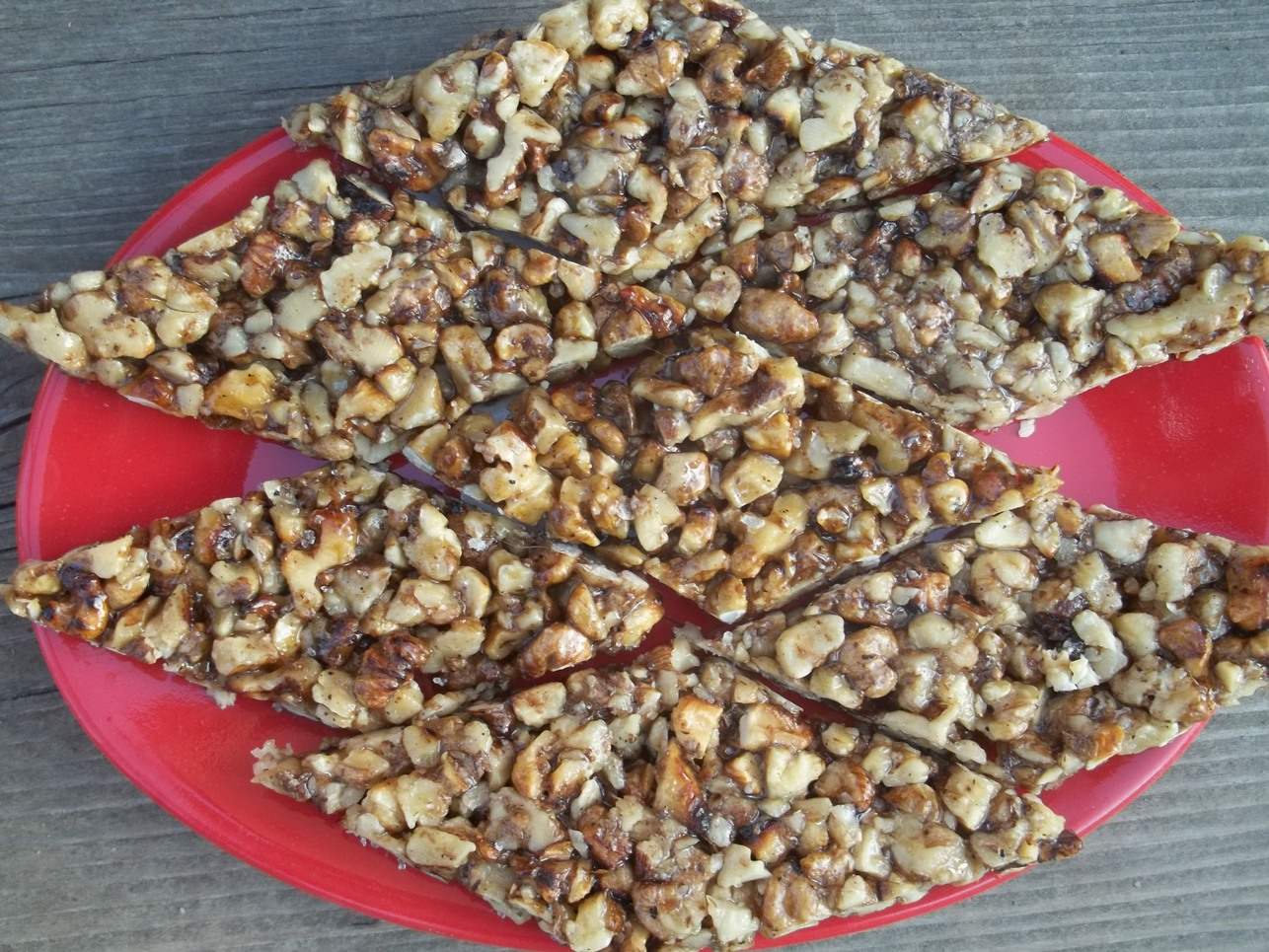
Georgian snack Gozinaki made from roasted walnuts and honey

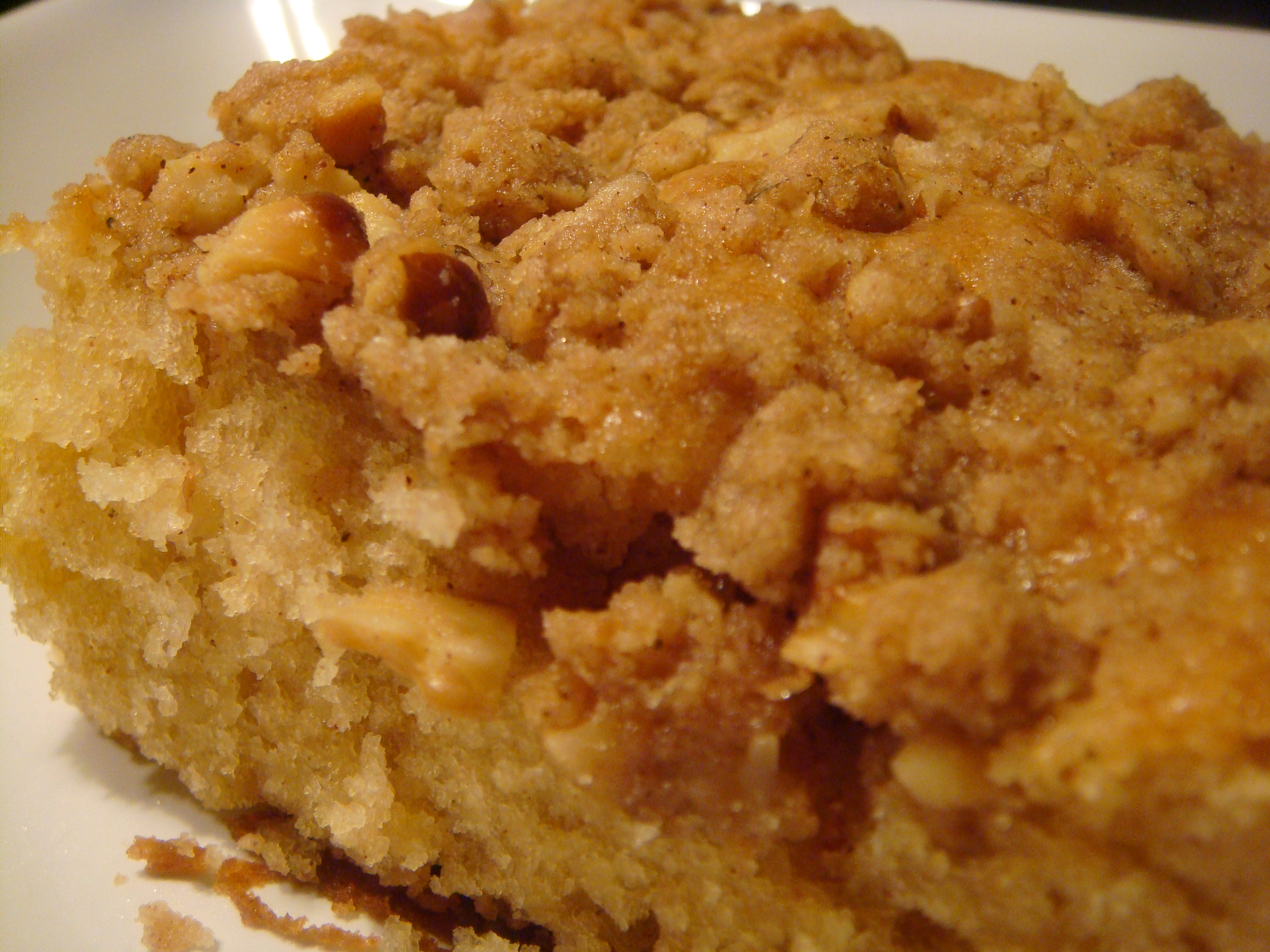
Applesauce coffee cake garnished with walnuts

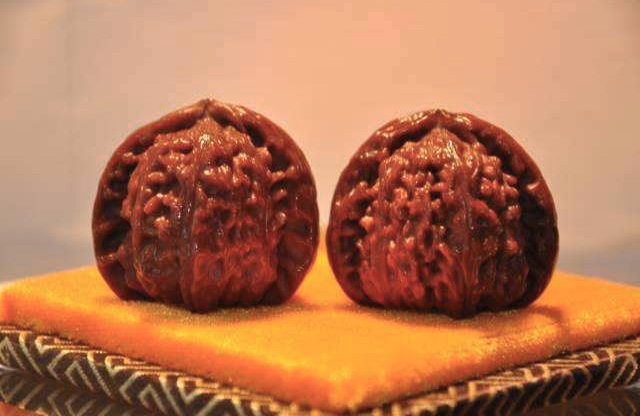
Wenwan walnuts as collectibles

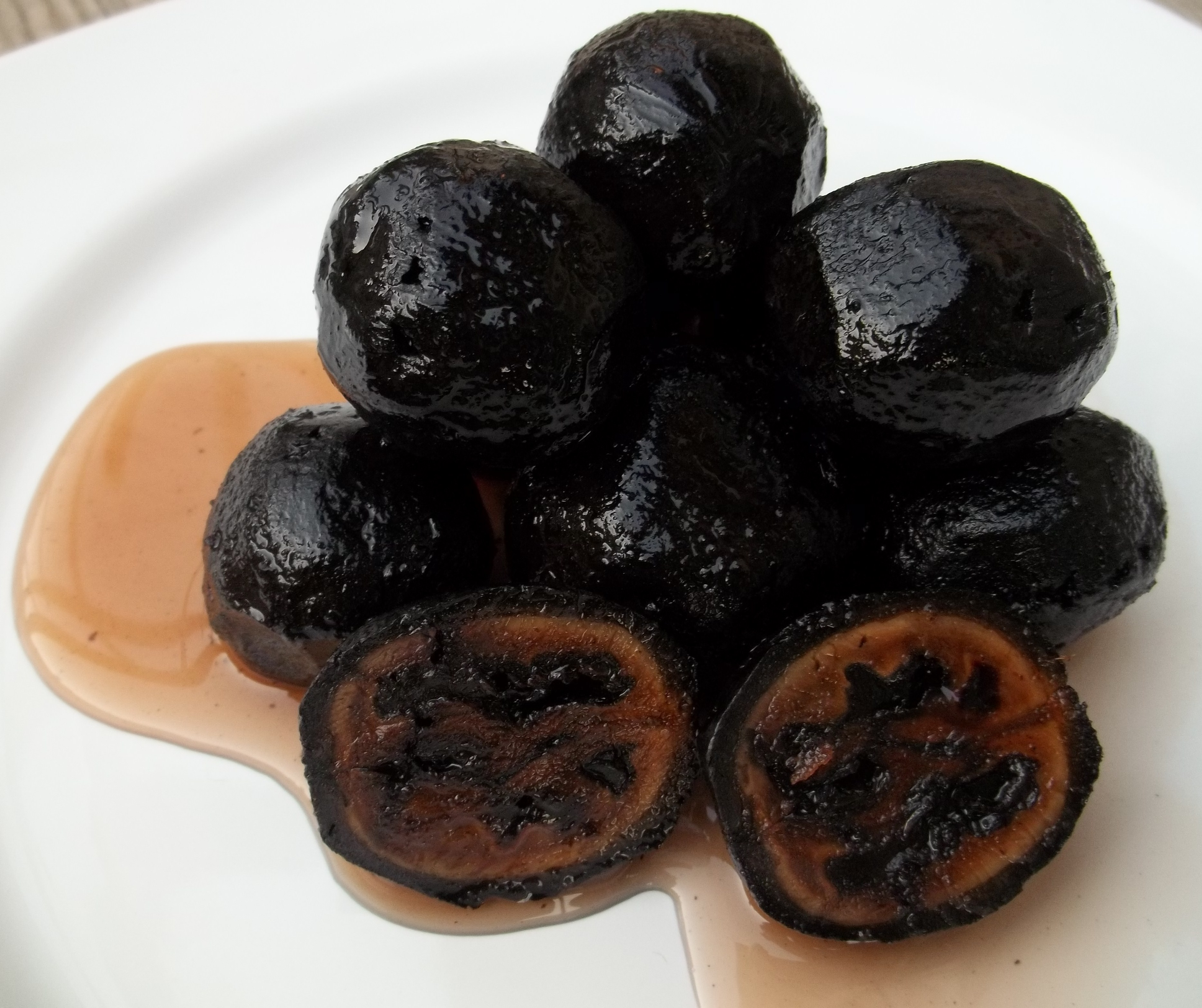
Murabba made from young walnuts

=== Inks and dyes ===
Walnut husks can be used to make durable ink for writing and drawing. It is thought to have been used by artists including Leonardo da Vinci and Rembrandt.

Walnut husk pigments are used as a brown dye for fabric and were used in classical Rome and medieval Europe for dyeing hair.

=== Cleaning ===
The US Army once used ground walnut shells for abrasive blasting to clean aviation parts because of their low cost and low abrasive qualities. However, an investigation of a fatal Boeing CH-47 Chinook helicopter crash (11 September 1982, in Mannheim, Germany) revealed that walnut shell grit had clogged an oil port, leading to the accident and the discontinuation of walnut shells as a cleaning agent.

Commercially, crushed walnut shells are still used outside of aviation for low-abrasive, less-toxic cleaning and blasting applications. In the oil and gas industry, deep bed filters of ground walnut shell are used for "polishing" (filtering) oily contaminates from water.

=== Cat litter ===
At least two companies, LitterMaid and Naturally Fresh, make cat litter from ground walnut shells. Advantages cited over conventional clay litter include environmental sustainability of using what would otherwise be a waste product, superior natural biodegradability, and odor control as good or better than that of clay litter. Disadvantages include the possibility of allergic reactions among humans and cats.

=== Folk medicine ===
Walnuts have been listed as one of the 38 substances used to prepare Bach flower remedies, a herbal remedy promoted in folk medicine practices for its supposed effect on health. According to Cancer Research UK, "there is no scientific evidence to prove that flower remedies can control, cure or prevent any type of disease, including cancer".

=== Collecting ===
Wenwan walnuts are large, symmetrically shaped, and sometimes intricately carved walnut shells (mainly from J. hopeiensis) which are valued collectibles in China where they are rotated in hand as a plaything or as decoration. They are also an investment and status symbol, with some carvings having high monetary value if unique. Pairs of walnuts are sometimes sold in their green husks for a form of gambling known as du qing pi.

== See also ==
- Pickled walnuts
