= L-type =

L-type or type-l or variation, may refer to:

== L-type ==
- L-type asteroid
- L-type star
- L-type lectin domain
- L-type calcium channel
- L-type ligand
- Japanese L type submarine
- L type carriage, rail car
- MG L-type, an automobile
- Renault L-Type engine

== Type-L ==
- Type L socket, an AC power outlet
- Zeppelin-Staaken Type "L", an airplane
- Morane Saulnier Type L, an airplane
- R.E.P. Type L Parasol, an airplane
- Handley Page Type L, an airplane
- Blackburn Type L, an airplane
- Caudron Type L, an airplane
- Thulin Type L, an airplane
- Japanese Type L submarine
- Soviet Type L submarine
- Type L grenade

== See also ==
- Type 1 (disambiguation)
- Type (disambiguation)
- L (disambiguation)
- L class (disambiguation) or Class-L
