= Category 1 =

Category 1 or Category One may refer to:

- Category 1 cable, an electrical standard for communications wiring
- Category 1 tropical cyclone, on any of the Tropical cyclone intensity scales
- Category 1 pandemic, on the pandemic severity index, an American influenza pandemic with a case-fatality ratio of less than 0.1%
- Category 1 winter storm, on the Northeast snowfall impact scale and the Regional snowfall index
  - Any of several winter storms listed at list of Northeast snowfall impact scale winter storms
- Category 01 non-silicate mineral - native element minerals
- "Category One" (Battle for Dream Island), a 2024 web series episode

== See also ==
- Class 1 (disambiguation) - class/category equivalence (for labeling)
- Type 1 (disambiguation) - type/category equivalence (for labeling)
- Group 1 (disambiguation) - group/category equivalence (for labeling)
- Category I (disambiguation) - Roman/Arabic numbering equivalence
