= Category 0 =

Category 0 can refer to:

- Empty category 0, the category of no objects and no morphisms, is the initial object of the category of small categories is the empty category
- Category [0], a simplex category
- Category 0 triage (Japan) - for victims who are dead, or whose injuries make survival unlikely.
- Category 0 of Grade 0 peripheral artery disease - asymptomatic
- Category 0 psychics in Psycho Busters - chronodivers, who have the ability to stop and reverse time and change the past
- Category 0 cultural heritage assets (Belarus) - inscribed or proposed for inscription on the World Heritage List
- Category "0" vessel - allowing unrestricted operation in the world's oceans
- Category 0 in "End of the Road" (Torchwood)
- Category 0 of the ILO International Classification of Radiographs of Pneumoconioses - the absence of small opacity

== See also ==
- Category O
- Category 1 (disambiguation)
