= Class 01 =

Class 01 may refer to:

- British Rail Class 01, a class of post-war British 0-4-0 diesel locomotive designed for use on tight curves and limited clearances
- British Rail Class 01/5, encompasses a variety of privately owned shunting locomotives
- DRG Class 01, a class of German standard steam locomotive designed between the wars for express train services
  - DRG Class 01.10, a later, more powerful version of the DRG Class 01 above first delivered in 1939
- Class 01, in the electrical Appliance classes

== See also ==
- Class 1 (disambiguation)
- Class I (disambiguation)
