= SdrG C terminal protein domain =

SdrG, C-terminal domain
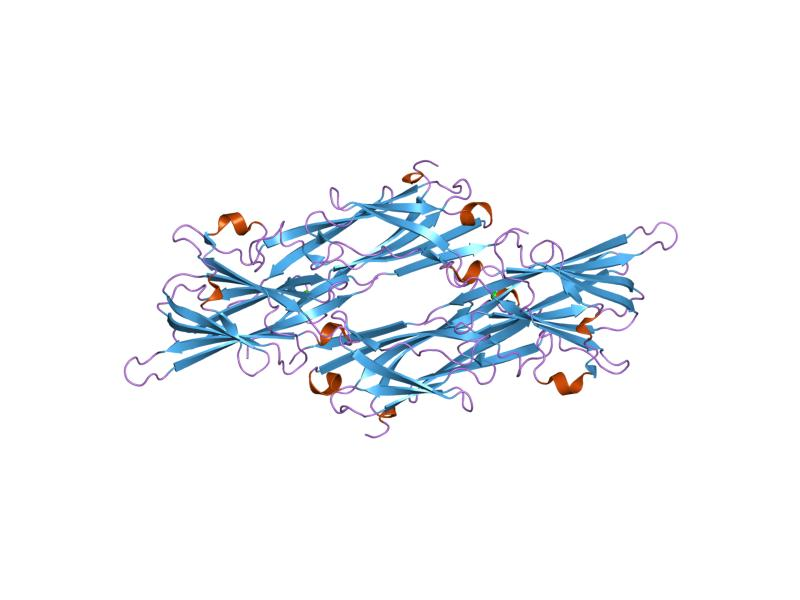
- Crystal structure analysis of S.epidermidis adhesin SdrG binding to fibrinogen (adhesin-ligand complex)

Identifiers
- Symbol: SdrG_C_C
- Pfam: PF10425
- InterPro: IPR011266
Available protein structures:
- Pfam: structures / ECOD
- PDB: RCSB PDB; PDBe; PDBj
- PDBsum: structure summary

In molecular biology, the protein domain SdrG C terminal refers to the C terminus domain of an adhesin found only on the cell walls of bacteria. More specifically, SdrG is only found in gram-positive bacteria. This particular domain binds to a glycoprotein named fibrinogen. SdrG stands for serine-aspartate dipeptide repeats, which as its name suggests, contains repeats of two amino acids, serine and aspartate.

Gram-positive pathogens such as Staphylococci, Streptococci, and Enterococci, contain SdrG anchored to their cell walls; these proteins act as adhesins and help the bacteria adhere to the host tissues via a dock-lock-latch mechanism. This protein domain is of huge significance since it binds to fibrinogen, a glycoprotein involved in important processes such as haemostasis and coagulation. By understanding more about the way they attach to human cells, it is hope a therapeutic target can be developed to prevent diseases such as nosocomial sepsis which are caused by a bacterium which operates in this manner.

== Function ==
=== SdrG protein function ===
SdrG protein is a bacterial cell wall-anchored adhesion and its function is to adhere to human cells. It does this by binding to the Beta chain of human fibrinogen which is found in the extracellular matrix. Such adhesins have also been named MSCRAMMs which is short for microbial surface components recognizing adhesive matrix molecules.

=== SdrG C-terminal domain function ===
The C-terminal domain is responsible for the attachment of the protein to the attachment of the protein to the cell wall.

== Mechanism ==
SdrG binds to its ligand with a dynamic "dock, lock, SdrG, the ligand binding site has been further localized and latch" mechanism. When it does bind to fibrinogen, it binds and forms an immunoglobin fold. SdrG as an apoprotein and in complex ligand binding activity peptide analogous to its binding site in Fg.

== Structure ==
The whole SdrG protein contains two domains, a N-terminal one named N2 domain and the C-terminal one named N3.

=== C terminal domain structure ===
The C terminus contain a LPXTG sequence motif and hydrophobic amino acid segments attached to peptidoglycan. The C-terminal domain has many features which are required to fulfill its role: a proline-rich wall-spanning region, the wall-anchoring LPTXG motif, a hydrophobic transmembrane region and a cytoplasmic tail of positively charged amino acid residues. wo main beta sheets made up of four beta strands each arranged in to a beta-sandwich topology. The C-terminal part of SdrG(276-596) is integral to the folding of the immunoglobulin-like whole to create the docking grooves necessary for Fg binding.

== Examples of proteins containing the SdrG C terminal domain ==
- clumping factor A
- fibronectin-binding proteins A and B
