= L-type lectin domain =

Lectin_leg-like
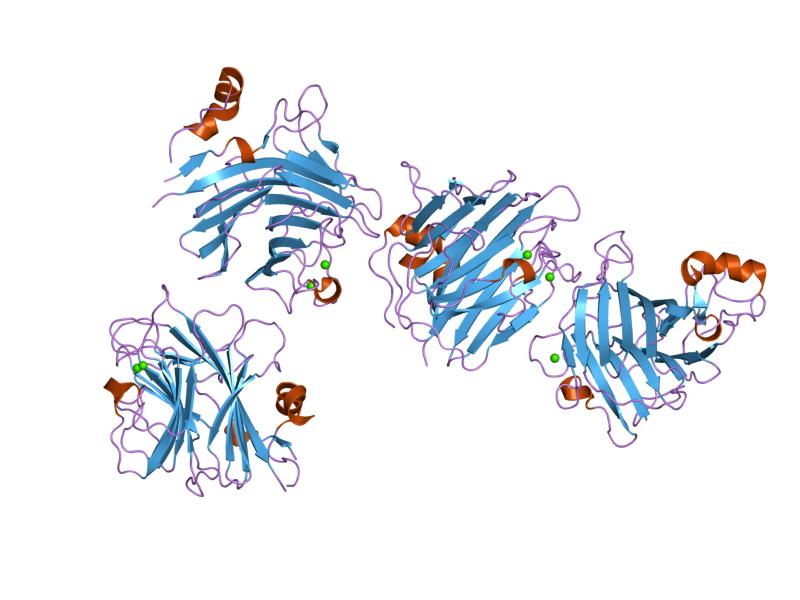
- the crystal structure of the carbohydrate recognition domain of the glycoprotein sorting receptor p58/ergic-53 reveals a novel metal binding site and conformational changes associated with calcium ion binding

Identifiers
- Symbol: Lectin_leg-like
- Pfam: PF03388
- Pfam clan: CL0004
- InterPro: IPR005052
- SCOP2: 1gv9 / SCOPe / SUPFAM
- Membranome: 719
Available protein structures:
- PDB: IPR005052 PF03388 (ECOD; PDBsum)
- AlphaFold: IPR005052; PF03388

In molecular biology the L-like lectin domain is a protein domain found in lectins which are similar to the leguminous plant lectins.

Lectins are structurally diverse proteins that bind to specific carbohydrates. This family includes the VIP36 and ERGIC-53 lectins. Although proteins containing this domain were originally identified as a family of animal lectins, there are also yeast representatives.

ERGIC-53 is a 53kDa protein, localised to the intermediate region between the endoplasmic reticulum and the Golgi apparatus (ER-Golgi-Intermediate Compartment, ERGIC). It was identified as a calcium-dependent, mannose-specific lectin. Its dysfunction has been associated with combined factors V and VIII deficiency, suggesting an important and substrate-specific role for ERGIC-53 in the glycoprotein-secreting pathway.

The L-like lectin domain has an overall globular shape composed of a beta-sandwich of two major twisted antiparallel beta-sheets. The beta-sandwich comprises a major concave beta-sheet and a minor convex beta-sheet, in a variation of the jelly roll fold.
