= South Australian Railways I class =

South Australian Railways I class may refer to:

- South Australian Railways I class (first), 0-4-0T steam locomotive
- South Australian Railways I class (second), 0-4-0ST steam locomotive
