= I class =

I class may refer to:

- Acheron-class destroyer, a class of destroyers that served in World War I
- I-class destroyer, a class of destroyers of the 1930s
- I-class ferry, a class of ferries operated by BC Ferries
- Istanbul-class frigate, a late 2010s class of indigenous Turkish frigates
- South Australian Railways I class (first), 0-4-0T steam locomotive
- South Australian Railways I class (second), 0-4-0ST steam locomotive
- WAGR I class, 0-6-4T steam locomotive

== See also ==
- Class I (disambiguation)
