= Class 1 =

Class 1 may refer to:

- Class I railroad, a term used in North American railroad size classification
- Class 1 Touring Cars, an FIA classification for cars in motor racing
- Class 1 World Powerboat Championship
- Classes of United States senators
- SCORE Class 1, unlimited off-road racing buggies
- The first class in terms of hiking difficulty in the Yosemite Decimal System
- A contribution class in the National Insurance system in the UK
- An IEC protection class in the electrical appliance manufacturing industry
- A class in laser safety
- HAZMAT Class 1 Explosives

== See also ==
- Class I (disambiguation)
- Class 01 (disambiguation)
- First class (disambiguation)
- NSB El 1, an electric locomotive of Norway
- NSB Di 1, a diesel locomotive of Norway
- Type 1 (disambiguation)
