= Juglans hopeiensis =

Scientific classification
- Kingdom: Plantae
- Clade: Tracheophytes
- Clade: Angiosperms
- Clade: Eudicots
- Clade: Rosids
- Order: Fagales
- Family: Juglandaceae
- Genus: Juglans
- Species: J. hopeiensis

Binomial name
- Juglans hopeiensis Hu

Species of tree

Juglans hopeiensis (Chinese: 麻核桃), also known as Ma walnut, is a species of walnut native to northern Hebei Province. Some scholars believe that the species is a hybrid of Juglans regia and Juglans mandshurica. Currently, it is a threatened tree species.

Historically, Ma walnut was originally distributed in the Northern Taihang Mountains of Hebei Province, so it was called Hebei walnut (河北核桃). This species is mainly distributed in some mountainous areas of Hebei Province, Shanxi Province, Beijing and Tianjin in China. The species is a popular choice in the production of Wenwan walnuts.

== Morphological characteristics ==
Ma walnut, whose scientific name is Juglans hopeiensis Hu, is a plant belonging to the genus Juglans of the family Juglandaceae. The plant can reach up to 20 meters high and often grow in high mountains. Its bark is gray-white with longitudinal cracks.

== Discovery and Naming ==
In 1930, Zhou Hanfan (周汉藩) discovered this new species in Banjiegou, Xiakou Village, Changping County, Hebei Province (now part of Beijing). Subsequently, one strain of the species was found in each of Jixian, Mentougou, and Lianhua Mountain.

In 1934, the new species was first described by the Chinese botanist Hu Xiansu (better known as H. H. Hu) in his paper entitled Notulae systematicae ad Florem Sinensium V. He originally indicated that the species was known locally as "Mahetao" (i.e. Ma walnut) and was once quite commonly cultivated, but it subsequently became less popular.

In 1981, several plants of Ma walnut were found again in Bancheng District, Lishui County, Hebei Province.

The name of the species was verified by AAS Systematic Botanist on October 15, 1998.
