= System I =

System I may refer to:

- IBM System i, a series of computer systems
- CCIR System I, an analogue broadcast television standard

== See also ==
- System One (disambiguation)
- System 1 (disambiguation)
