= L-class destroyer =

L-class destroyer may refer to:

- Laforey-class destroyer (1913), a class of Royal Navy torpedo boat destroyers
- L and M-class destroyer, a class of Royal Navy destroyers launched between 1939 and 1942
