= Big L (disambiguation) =

Big L may refer to:

- Lamont Coleman (1974–1999), better known as Big L, American hip-hop artist
- "The Big L", a single from Swedish duo Roxette's third studio album, Joyride (1991)

Or a number of British radio stations:

- Wonderful Radio London, an American-owned offshore radio station broadcasting to Britain and Europe (1964–1967)
- Radio Luxembourg's English-language programmes in the late 1960s and early '70s
