= L band (disambiguation) =

L band may refer to:

- L band, as defined by the IEEE, a radio frequency band from 1 to 2 GHz
- L band (infrared), an atmospheric transmission window centred on 3.5 μm
- L band (NATO), a millimetre wave band from 40 to 60 GHz
- 1565 nm to 1625 nm, a transmission window in fiber-optic communication
