= L-class submarine =

L class submarine may refer to:

- British L-class submarine
- United States L-class submarine
- Leninets-class submarine, of the Soviet Navy
- Japanese Type L submarine
