= L – A Mathemagical Adventure =

L - A Mathemagical Adventure
- Developers: Richard Phillips, and including Derek Ball, Tony Corbett, David Rooke, Heather Scott, Alan Shaw, Margaret Stevens, Ruth Townsend, Jo Waddingham, Roger Waddingham, John Warwick, Alan Wigley, John Wood, and David Wooldridge.
- Publisher: Association of Teachers of Mathematics
- Platforms: BBC Micro, LINK 480Z
- Release: 1984
- Genres: Text Adventure, Edutainment

L – A Mathemagical Adventure is an educational adventure game that was created for the BBC/Acorn class of computers in 1984. It was written by members of the Association of Teachers of Mathematics and found its way into school computers, predominantly in the UK. The game is controlled by a contemporaneous two-word input system in the form of "<verb> <noun>", e.g. "get book", and includes several mathematical and logical puzzles. The target audience for L is mid-late primary (elementary) school children, and the puzzles are based on this level of critical thinking.

== Introduction text ==
It is a very hot day. You are sitting on the grass outside a crumbling palace. Your sister is reading a book called "Fractions and the Four Rules - 5000 Carefully Graded Problems". You are bored and the heat is making you feel a little sleepy. Suddenly you see an old man dressed as an abbot. He glances at you nervously and disappears through a small door in the side of the palace.

== Memorable characters/puzzles ==
The recommended usage of L was for a class of students (or smaller groups) to attempt solving the various puzzles in the game in short pieces over the course of a semester, year or similarly protracted time and is hence somewhat difficult to remember.

Drogo Robot Guard - These appear somewhat randomly at different times during the game and attempt to capture the player. It is possible to evade capture (a small puzzle in itself), and avoid being taken to the attic.

Runia - It is possible to solve the game by completing most of the puzzles, but a full solution includes rescuing Runia, a princess who is imprisoned within the game.

Three Blind Mice - One of the puzzles is a musical puzzle, where you have to play the correct tune on a piano in order to obtain a special item.

== Use and reception ==
L has been extensively cited as a tool to help children learn spatial reasoning by scholars. A book on the BBC Micro noted that L integrated math concepts into the characters and story instead of just simply displaying sums. A UK teaching guide in 2010 said that L was an "old, excellent example of a well-thought-out, text-based mathematical game" that was "is worth buying a copy for yourself." One higher education teaching book noted that the game was an excellent example of "a mathematical game, not explicitly about skills practice" in a positive note. The game was featured in a 1993 fair to help make parents more maths literate with their children in St Neots.
