= Wenwan walnuts =

Chinese recreational walnuts

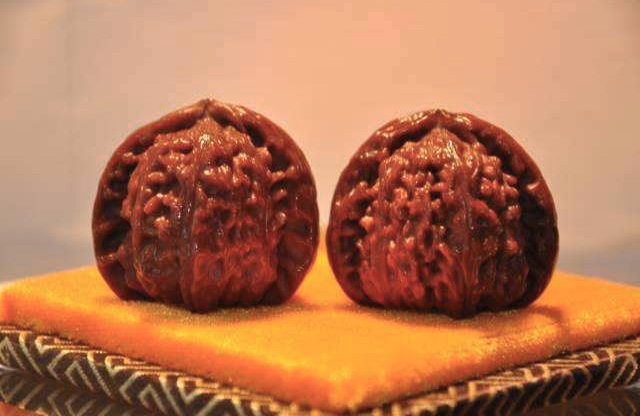
Polished pair of Wenwan walnuts

Wenwan walnuts (Chinese: 文玩核桃; pinyin: Wénwán hétáo; lit. 'cultural plaything walnuts') are walnuts that are used for hand massages and collected in Chinese culture. They are typically sourced from cultivars, mainly of Juglans hopeiensis, that have thick shells and distinctive ridge patterns. The shells are matched as pairs and sometimes carved. When handled over time, they develop a glossy red patina that is desirable to collectors. Walnuts were a hobby in the Qing dynasty but have since been revived as collectables in modern times. The popularity and initial scarcity of Wenwan walnuts led to both speculation and large-scale cultivation until prices plummeted in 2015.

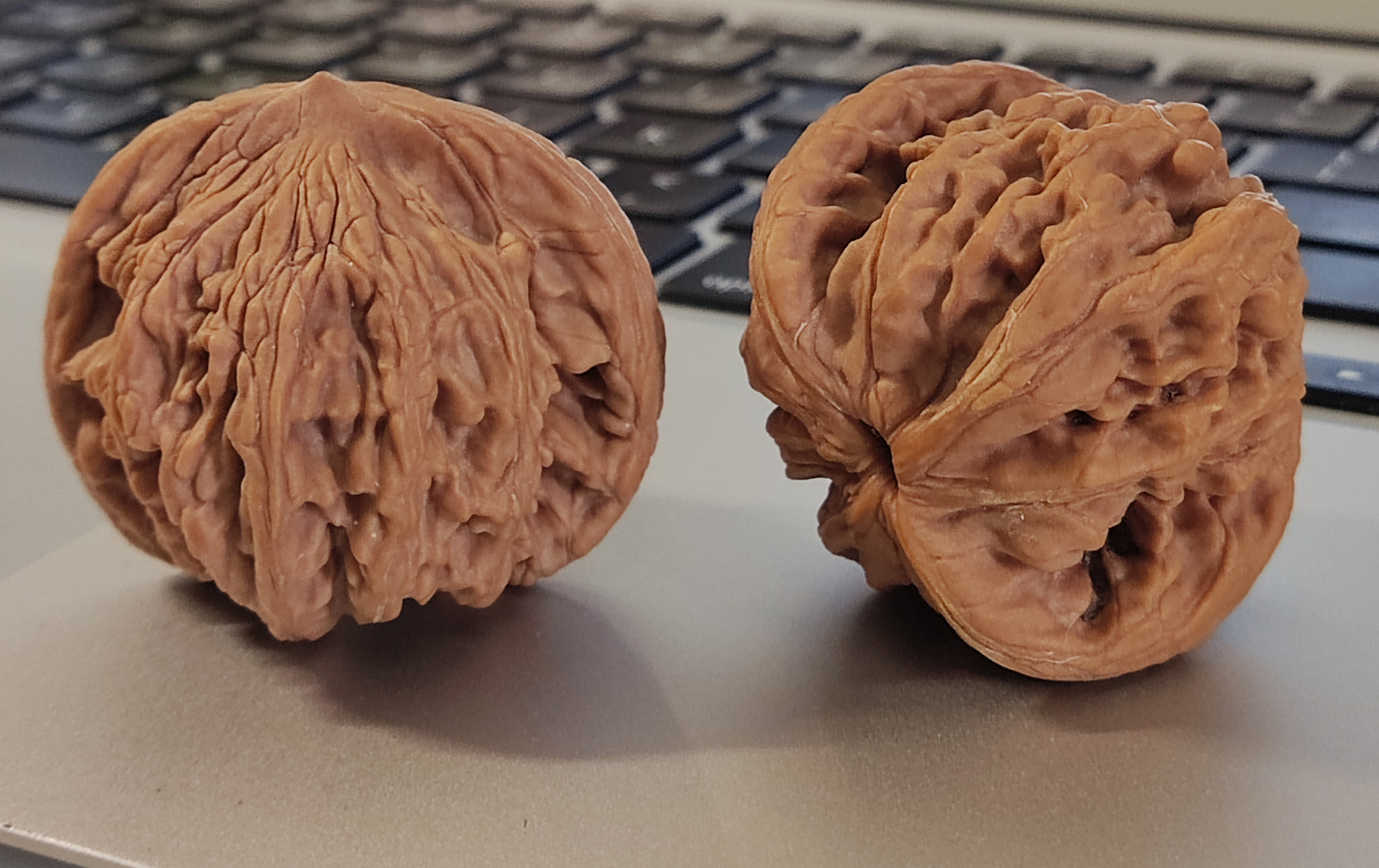
Pair of walnuts typically used for Wenwan (Juglans hopeiensis)

== History ==
Walnuts have had cultural significance in China since the Han dynasty. They were classically thought to have been introduced from the west by Zhang Qian, but it has been disputed that they may have been introduced later. Walnuts were not widely grown or eaten in China until the Tang dynasty.

In the mid-Ming to early-Qing dynasty, the art of fruit pit carving advanced, and finely-carved pits including walnuts shells were treasured as ornaments by high-ranking officials and nobles. Walnuts were carved with designs like flower baskets, playing children, and arhats.

The earliest physical examples of walnuts for hand massage are more than ten well-used pairs in an imperial palace collection from the mid-to-late Qing dynasty, currently held at the Palace Museum in Beijing. Some were carved, kept in cases decorated with symbols of longevity, or labeled as gifts from nobles. One pair had a desk stand and another was in a waist bag. The walnuts in these collections were primarily qiúzi walnuts and iron walnuts, which are relatively unpopular today.

Hand-massage walnuts were also a hobby of members of the Eight Banners. Around the turn of the twentieth century, stipends were cut and members demobilized and subsequently joined the workforce. Many of their leisure activities, including Wenwan walnuts were introduced into Beijing's popular culture. Walnuts continued as a hobby into the Republican period, then declined as a result of the four olds campaign targeting traditional Chinese customs and cultural practices during the Cultural Revolution. However, the later revival of interest in traditional Chinese culture, together with economic development during the reform era have since led to a renewed rise in popularity for Wenwan walnuts.

== Economics ==
A modern interest in collecting cultural Chinese objects has led to the growth of a commercial Wenwan walnut market. The practice became increasingly popular within Bejing before spreading to other parts of China. In response to new demand, specialty folk markets such as the Shilihe market developed. There have been cases of counterfeiting Wenwan walnuts.

Around 2010, newly introduced regulations for Beijing's property market alongside mass speculation drove wealthy individuals to invest in various alternative goods such as tea, garlic, and Wenwan walnuts. At the peak of the walnut speculative market, a pair of very high-quality walnuts could sell for as much as CN¥300,000–400,000. Chinese film director Feng Xiaogang allegedly spent CN¥100,000 on a pair. To meet the high demand, walnut farmers grafted varieties for Wenwan walnuts onto other trees to increase production, leading to an oversupply of walnuts. The speculative bubble of walnuts ultimately began to decline in 2014, with a market crash in 2015. In 2023, the price for high-quality walnuts was CN¥20,000−30,000 a pair, with most of the value coming from the duration of handling.

Green husk gambling (赌青皮) is the activity of buying pairs of unhusked walnuts from street merchants with the hopes of unhusking a pair of walnuts with a desirable shape or colouration during the autumn harvest season. The term is also used to describe the actions of merchants that buy bulk unhusked walnuts by the tree from farmers.

== Cultivation ==
Wenwan walnuts come from the mountainous areas of Beijing, Tianjin, and Hebei. The largest share are Ma walnuts (Juglans hopeiensis); some are J. sigillata or J. mandshurica. Although technically edible, they have smaller kernels, thicker shells, and lower yield than those grown for food. Grafting is used to improve yield and shell quality, and the nut can also be shaped while growing.

There had been many Ma walnut trees in the peripheries of Beijing before 1958, but they became scarce after authorities encouraged people to graft them into thin-skinned walnuts. During the boom in Wenwan walnuts, a portion of the remaining trees had branches stolen or were destroyed despite being heavily guarded. Large-scale walnut cultivation contributed significantly to the economic development of some rural areas. From 2013 to 2015 in Laishui County, Hebei, one major growing area, the number of trees grown for Wenwan walnuts increased from approximately one to two million, and the number of households growing them increased from about 25,000 to 45,000. After prices crashed, many farmers switched to thin-skinned walnuts.

== Collecting ==
Wenwan walnuts are one of the most popular Wenwan collectables, and are considered an entry point into the broader hobby. As part of the traditional hobby of using walnuts for hand massage, collectors have appreciated walnuts for their aesthetic qualities and purported health benefits. In the modern revival, a culture of connoisseurship developed, and enthusiasts considered the size, ridge patterns, shape, and color of walnuts to determine their collectible value.

Wenwan walnuts are classified based on their shape and pattern of ridges. Some popular varieties are Shizitou (lion's head), Hutou (tiger's head), Jixin (chicken heart), Guanmao (official's hat), and Gongzimao (gentleman's hat). Collectors value closely-matching pairs of walnuts, which are difficult to find naturally and may involve posting a "marriage ad". The overall preference is for larger shells, with diameters going from 3–4 cm (1.2–1.6 in) to over 5 cm (2.0 in), but small-shelled varieties from wild trees have also become popular. Walnuts from grafted trees were initially controversial but have become accepted. Walnuts used as carving material are also called Wenwan walnuts.

There are various ways of playing with Wenwan walnuts such as swirling, massaging, kneading, and pinching. The fiddling is said to stimulate acupoints, promote dexterity and blood circulation, and soothe anxiety. After extended handling, the shells develop a glossy reddish patina from friction, sweat, and the skin's oil that contributes to their collectible value.

== See also ==
- Baoding balls
- Prayer beads
- Tulip mania
