= HAZMAT Class 1 Explosives =

Class of explosive materials

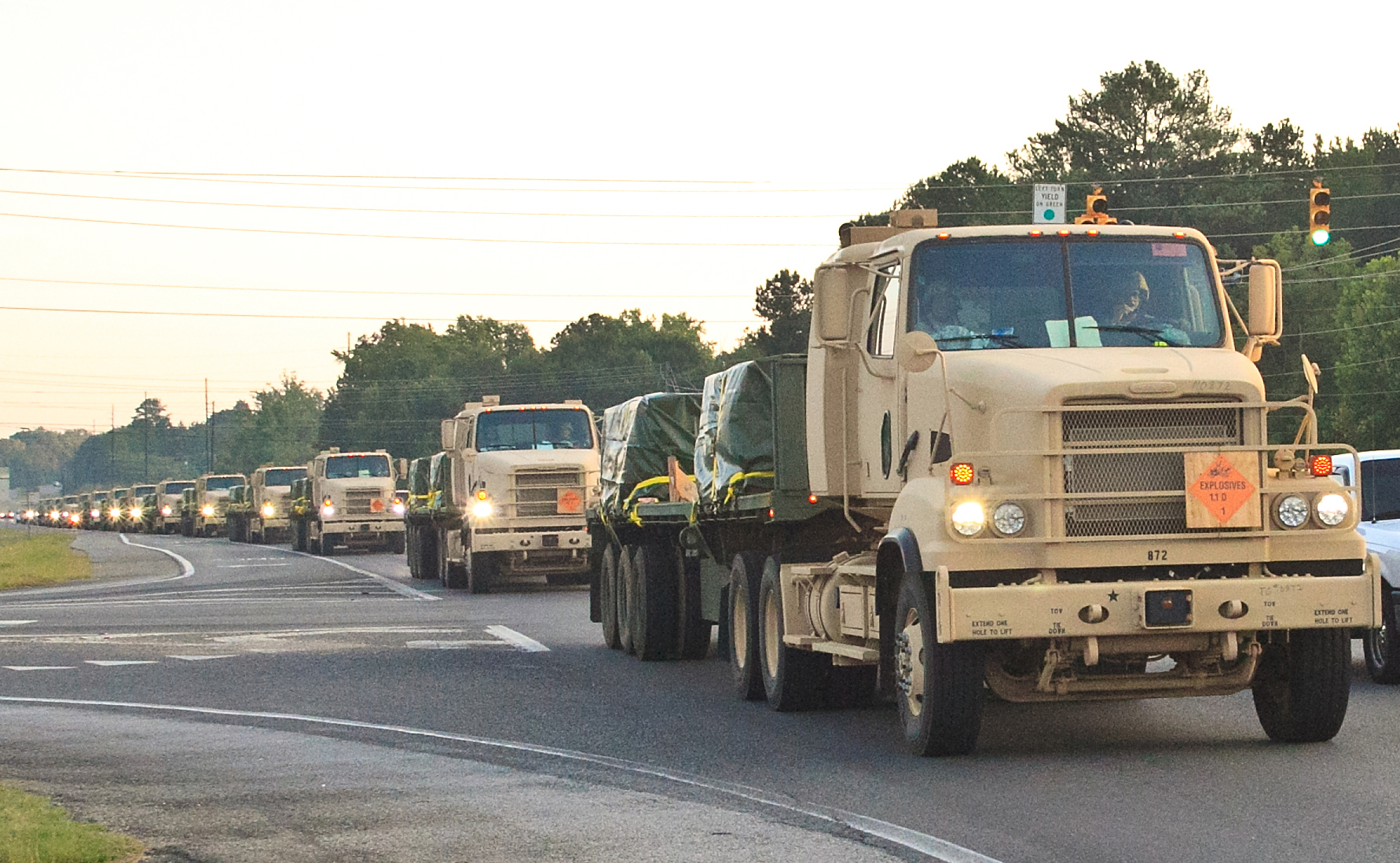
US Army trucks laden with ammunition, displaying a Class 1.1D Explosives placard on the front.

Hazmat Class 1 are explosive materials which are any substance or article, including a device, which is designed to function by explosion or which, by chemical reaction within itself is able to function in a similar manner even if not designed to function by explosion. (Note: In the United States, an article that meets this guideline, might be otherwise classed in a different class under a provision of Title 49 of the Code of Federal Regulations.)

Class 1 consists of six 'divisions', that describes the potential hazard posed by the explosive. The division number is the second number after the decimal point on a placard. (Note: Example: A division 1 explosive is shown as "1.1" on the placard.) The classification has an additional layer, of categorization, known as 'compatibility groups', which breaks explosives in the same division into one of 13 groups, identified by a letter, which is used to separate incompatible explosives from each other. This letter also appears on the placard, following the number. (Note: Most diagrams of placards, including the ones in this article, represent the compatibility group letter with an asterisk ( * ) as a placeholder.)

The movement of class 1 materials is tightly regulated, especially for divisions 1.1 and 1.2, which represent some of the most dangerous explosives, with the greatest potential for destruction and loss of life. Regulations in the United States require drivers have and follow a pre-prepared route, not park the vehicle within 300 feet (91 m) of bridges, tunnels, a fire, or crowded places. The vehicle must be attended to by its driver at all times while its parked. Drivers are also required to carry the following paperwork and keep it in an accessible and easy to locate location: written emergency instructions, written route plan, a copy of Federal Motor Carrier Safety Regulations, Part 397 - Transport of Hazardous Materials; driving and parking rules. Some tunnels and bridges severely restrict or completely forbid vehicles carrying Class 1 cargoes.

== Placards ==
United States Department of Transportation Placards	United Nations GHS hazard pictograms	Division number	Risk	Examples
		(N/A)	Basic placard for explosive materials - Division not specified	Anything listed below
		1.1	Substances and articles which have a mass explosion hazard	Dynamite, Trinitrotoluene (TNT), ANFO (ammonium nitrate/fuel oil)
		1.2	Substances and articles which have a projection hazard but not a mass explosion hazard	Hand grenades
		1.3	Substances and articles which have a fire hazard and either a minor blast hazard or a minor projection hazard or both	Display/commercial grade fireworks, rocket propellant
		1.4	Substances and articles which present no significant hazard; only a small hazard in the event of ignition or initiation during transport with any effects largely confined to the package	Consumer fireworks, ammunition, railway fog signals (detonators/torpedo), model rocket motors
		1.5	Very insensitive substances which have a mass explosion hazard	Type E water emulsion blasting agents
		1.6	Extremely insensitive articles which do not have a mass explosion hazard	

== Compatibility table ==
=== Transportation segregation table ===
Load and segregation chart
	Weight	1.1	1.2	1.3	1.4	1.5	1.6	2.1	2.2	2.2	2.3		3	4.1	4.2	4.3	5.1	5.2	6.1	7	8	9
	Weight	1.1	1.2	1.3	1.4	1.5	1.6	2.1	2.2	2.2	A	B	3	4.1	4.2	4.3	5.1	5.2	A	7	8	9
1.1	Any quantity							No	No	No	No	No	No	No	No	No	No	No	No	No	No	
1.2	Any quantity							No	No	No	No	No	No	No	No	No	No	No	No	No	No	
1.3	Any Quantity							No	No	No	No	No	No	No	No	No	No	No	No	No	No	
1.4	1,001 lb (454 kg)							O			O	O	O						O		O	
1.5	1,001 lb (454 kg)							No	No	No	No	No	No	No	No	No	No	No	No	No	No	
1.6	1,001 lb (454 kg)																					
Key
The absence of any hazard class or division or a blank space in the table indicates that no restrictions apply.: : This indicates that segregation among different Class 1 materials is governed by the compatibility group table in 49CFR 177.848(f).; X: These materials may not be loaded, transported, or stored together in the same transport vehicle or storage facility during the course of transportation.; O: Indicates that these materials may not be loaded, transported or stored together in the same transport vehicle or storage facility during the course of transportation, unless separated in a manner that, in the event of leakage from packages under conditions normally incident to transportation, commingling of hazardous materials would not occur.; Source: United States Code of Federal Regulations, Title 49 CFR §177.848 - Segregation of hazardous materials.

=== Compatibility group table ===
Compatibility table for class 1 materials
	A	B	C	D	E	F	G	H	J	K	L	N	S
A		No	No	No	No	No	No	No	No	No	No	No	No
B	No		No	4	No	No	No	No	No	No	No	No	4/5
C	No	No		2	2	No	No	No	No	No	No	3	4/5
D	No	4	2		2	No	No	No	No	No	No	3	4/5
E	No	No	2	2		No	No	No	No	No	No	3	4/5
F	No	No	No	No	No		No	No	No	No	No	No	4/5
G	No	No	No	No	No	No		No	No	No	No	No	4/5
H	No	No	No	No	No	No	No		No	No	No	No	4/5
J	No	No	No	No	No	No	No	No		No	No	No	4/5
K	No	No	No	No	No	No	No	No	No		No	No	4/5
L	No	No	No	No	No	No	No	No	No	No	1	No	No
N	No	No	No	No	No	No	No	No	No	No	No		4/5
S	No	4/5	4/5	4/5	4/5	4/5	4/5	4/5	4/5	4/5	4/5	4/5	
Notes
A blank space in the table indicates that no restrictions apply.: X: Indicates that explosives of different compatibility groups may not be carried on the same transport vehicle.; 1: An explosive from compatibility group L shall only be carried on the same transport vehicle with an identical explosive.; 2: Any combination of explosives from compatibility groups C, D, or E is assigned to compatibility group E.; 3: Any combination of explosives from compatibility groups C, D, or E with those in compatibility group N is assigned to compatibility group D.; 4: Refer to 49 CFR 177.835(g) when transporting detonators.; 5: Division 1.4S fireworks may not be loaded on the same transport vehicle with Division 1.1 or 1.2 materials.; Except as provided in the following paragraph, explosives of the same compatibility group but of different divisions may be transported together provided that the whole shipment is transported as though its entire contents were of the lower numerical division (i.e., Division 1.1 being lower than 1.2). For example, a mixed shipment of Division 1.2 materials and Division 1.4 materials, both of compatibility group D, must be transported as Division 1.2 materials When Division 1.5 materials, compatibility group D, are transported in the same freight container as Division 1.2 materials, compatibility group D, the shipment must be transported as Division 1.1 materials, compatibility group D. Source: United States Code of Federal Regulations, Title 49 CFR §177.848 - Segregation of hazardous materials.

== See also ==
- Dangerous goods
- Explosive
