= System One =

System One, System I or System 1 may refer to:

== Computing ==
- Acorn System 1, 8-bit microcomputer by Acorn
- Cromemco System One, a microcomputer from the early 1980s by Cromemco
- IBM Q System One, a 2019 circuit-based commercial quantum computer by IBM
- Line Drawing System-1, an early graphical computer
- Sega System 1, the arcade system board
- System 1, the initial operating system version for the Apple Macintosh
- Tulip System-1, 16-bit personal computer by Tulip

== Other uses ==
- System-1 Aira, a synthesizer produced by Roland
- System One, a range of bus passes offered by Transport for Greater Manchester
- System 1, the fast, automatic mode of thinking, as described in Daniel Kahneman's book Thinking, Fast and Slow

== See also ==
- System I (disambiguation)
- SystmOne, a clinical and administrative software system developed by TPP (The Phoenix Partnership) company.
- Series 1
