= Type 1 =

Type 1 or Type I or variant, may refer to:

== Health ==
- Diabetes mellitus type 1 (also known as "Type 1 Diabetes"), insulin-dependent diabetes
- Type I female genital mutilation
- Type 1 personality
- Type I hypersensitivity (or immediate hypersensitivity), an allergic reaction

== Vehicles ==
- Type 1 diesel locomotives

=== Civilian automotive ===
- US F1 Type 1, 2010 F1 Car
- Bugatti Type 1, an automobile
- Peugeot Type 1, 1890s vis-a-vis
- Volkswagen Type 1, an automobile commonly known as the Volkswagen Beetle

=== Military ===
- German Type I submarine
- Type 001 aircraft carrier, PLAN carrier class variant of the Soviet Kuznetsov class
- Nakajima Ki-43, officially designated Army Type 1 Fighter

==== Japanese armoured vehicles of World War II ====
- Type 1 Chi-He, a tank
- Type 1 Ho-Ni I, a tank
- Type 1 Ho-Ha, an armoured personnel carrier
- Type 1 Ho-Ki, an armoured personnel carrier

== Weapons ==
- Type 1 37 mm Anti-Tank Gun, a Japanese weapon
- Type 1 47 mm Anti-Tank Gun, a Japanese weapon
- Type 01 LMAT, a Japanese fire-and-forget anti-tank missile
- Type 1 heavy machine gun, a Japanese weapon
- Type 1 machine gun, a Japanese weapon
- Type I Rifle, Arisaka; a Japanese combat rifle

== Other uses ==
- Type I and type II errors used in statistics
- Type 1 encryption, a cryptographical certification
- Type 1 fonts
- Type-1 Gumbel distribution, a distribution function
- Type I lattice
- Type 1 sequence
- Type I plug/socket, known formally as AS 3112, an Australian standard for mains power plugs
- Type 1 electrical connector, used by electric vehicles
- Type I superconductor
- Type I string theory
- Type I transmembrane protein
- Type I, part of the Kardashev scale of measuring a civilization's technology level
- IEC Type I, one of the four "type" classifications of audio cassette formulation
- MOT Type 1 Stone, a UK specification for aggregate used as a sub-base in the construction of driveways and roads.
- Type-1 language in the Chomsky hierarchy of formal languages, a.k.a. context-sensitive language

== See also ==
- Aptera Typ-1, prototype 3-wheeled autocycle
- L type (disambiguation) or "type-l"
- Type (disambiguation)
- 1 (disambiguation)
- Class 1 (disambiguation)
- Model 1 (disambiguation)
- System 1 (disambiguation)
