= LMAN2L =

Protein-coding gene in the species Homo sapiens

Identifiers
- Aliases: LMAN2L, VIPL, MRT52, lectin, mannose binding 2 like
- External IDs: OMIM: 609552; MGI: 2443010; HomoloGene: 57125; GeneCards: LMAN2L; OMA:LMAN2L - orthologs

Gene location (Human)
Chr.	Chromosome 2 (human)
Band	2q11.2	Start	96,705,929 bp
Band	2q11.2	End	96,740,064 bp

Gene location (Mouse)
Chr.	Chromosome 1 (mouse)
Band	1|1 B	Start	36,458,952 bp
Band	1|1 B	End	36,484,352 bp
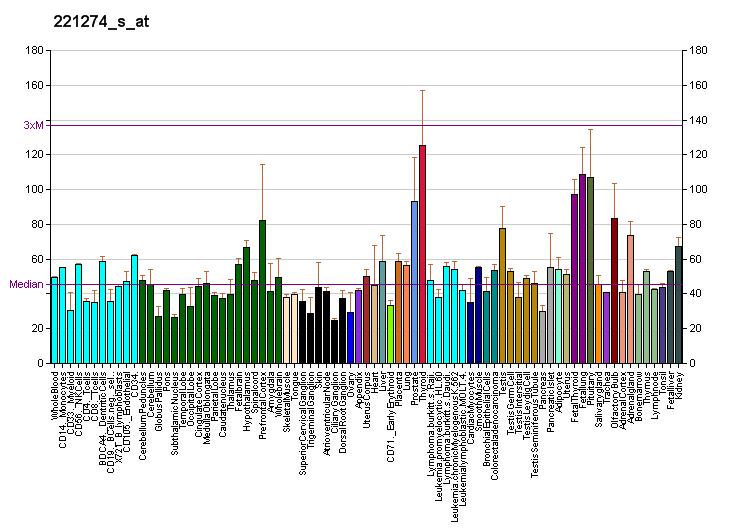
RNA expression pattern
Bgee	Human / Mouse (ortholog); Top expressed in: islet of Langerhans; renal medulla; ovary; right ovary; right uterine tube; right lobe of thyroid gland; left ovary; anterior pituitary; left ventricle; gonad / Top expressed in: otolith organ; utricle; right kidney; hand; olfactory epithelium; vestibular membrane of cochlear duct; thymus; proximal tubule; granulocyte; molar; More reference expression data
BioGPS	More reference expression data
Gene ontology
Molecular function	mannose binding; metal ion binding; carbohydrate binding
Cellular component	integral component of membrane; Golgi apparatus; endoplasmic reticulum membrane; endoplasmic reticulum; membrane; Golgi membrane; COPII-coated ER to Golgi transport vesicle; endoplasmic reticulum-Golgi intermediate compartment
Biological process	protein transport; endoplasmic reticulum to Golgi vesicle-mediated transport; protein folding; endoplasmic reticulum organization; Golgi organization
Sources:Amigo / QuickGO
Orthologs
Species	Human	Mouse
Entrez	81562	214895
Ensembl	ENSG00000114988	ENSMUSG00000001143
UniProt	Q9H0V9	P59481
RefSeq (mRNA)	NM_001142292; NM_030805; NM_001322346; NM_001322347; NM_001322350 NM_001322351; NM_001322352; NM_001322354; NM_001322355; NM_001322356	NM_001013374; NM_001310517
RefSeq (protein)	NP_001135764; NP_001309275; NP_001309276; NP_001309279; NP_001309280 NP_001309281; NP_001309283; NP_001309284; NP_001309285; NP_110432	NP_001013392; NP_001297446
Location (UCSC)	Chr 2: 96.71 – 96.74 Mb	Chr 1: 36.46 – 36.48 Mb
PubMed search
- Wikidata
View/Edit Human	View/Edit Mouse

VIP36-like protein is a protein that in humans is encoded by the LMAN2L gene.
