= Barry Railway Class L =

Class of 10 two-cylinder 0-6-4T locomotives

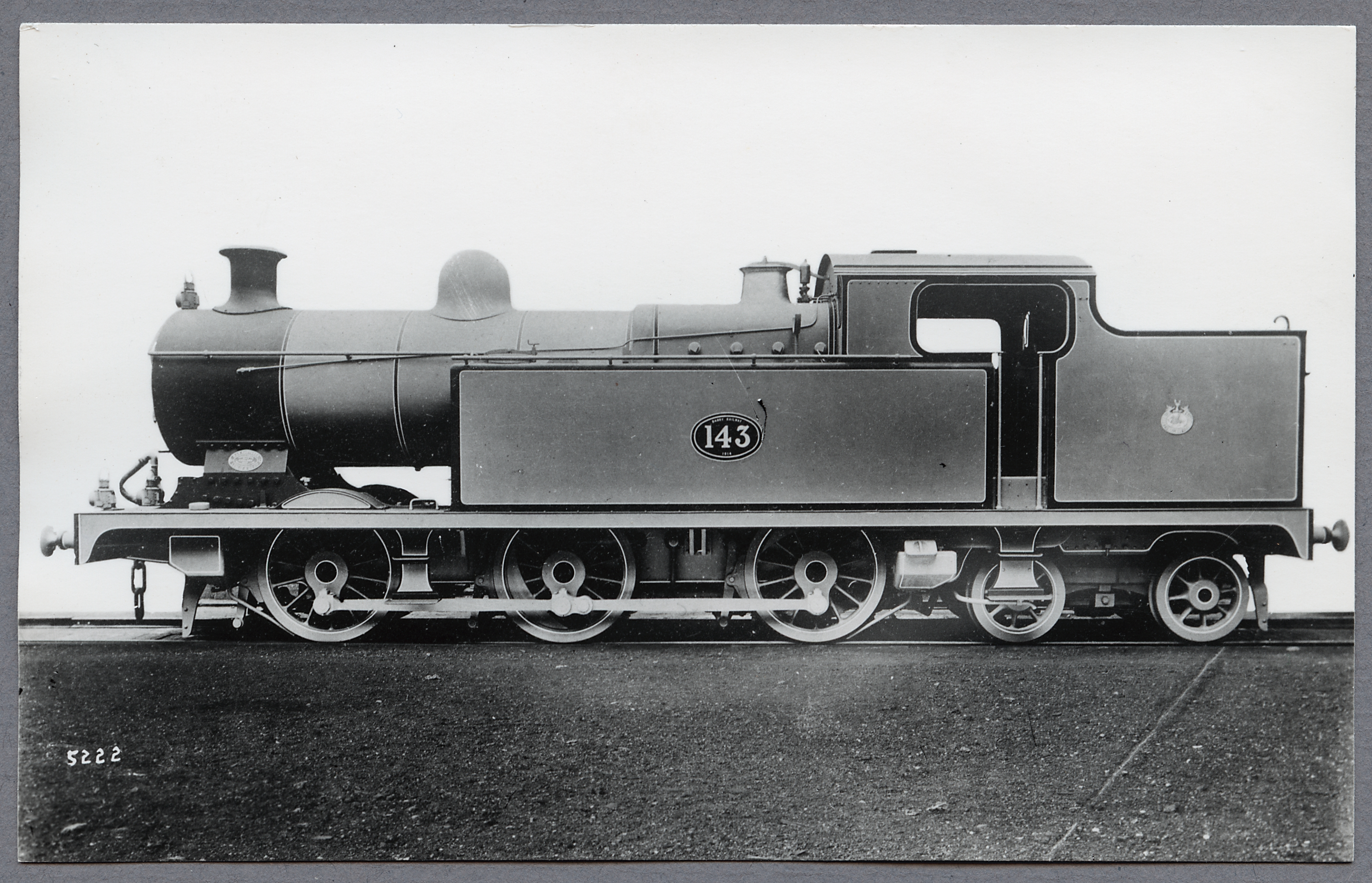
Type and origin
- Power type: Steam
- Designer: John Auld
- Builder: Hawthorn Leslie and Company
- Build date: 1914
- Total produced: 10
Specifications
- Configuration
  - Whyte: 0-6-4T
  - UIC: C2 n2t
- Gauge: 4 ft 8 1/2 in (1,435 mm) standard gauge
- Driver dia.: 4 ft 7 in (1.397 m)
- Trailing dia.: 3 ft 1 in (0.940 m)
- Wheelbase: 28 ft 0 in (8.534 m)
- Loco weight: 74 long tons 15 cwt (167,400 lb or 75.9 t) (83.7 short tons)
- Fuel type: Coal
- Cylinders: Two inside
- Cylinder size: 18.5 in × 26 in (470 mm × 660 mm)
Performance figures
- Tractive effort: 24,755 lbf (110.12 kN)
Career
- Operators: BR → GWR
- Delivered: 1914
- Withdrawn: 1926
- Disposition: All scrapped

Barry Railway Class L were 0-6-4T steam tank locomotives of the Barry Railway in South Wales. They were designed by John Auld, his only design for the Barry Railway, built by Hawthorn Leslie and Company and were introduced in 1914. They were originally intended for use on heavy coal trains from Trehafod but, as the B1 class proved more than adequate for the work, they were assigned to different duties. These included pulling mineral trains from Rhymney and New Tredegar on the Brecon and Merthyr, from Rogerstone Yard on the Great Western and from Neath Junction, also on the Great Western. They were also to be seen occasionally pulling the suburban service to Cardiff.

== Design fault ==
The class had a design fault that caused it to derail when travelling over facing hand-operated points, usually found in colliery sidings, marshalling yards and the dock area. The rear coupled wheels beneath the cab would force the tongue of the points open, directing the trailing bogie onto the diverging track. This was because the points lacked a locking mechanism like those on the main line. This could result in derailment; No 147 ended up on its side when entering Barry Sidings with a coal train from Coity. Less extreme but still serious damage could occur, for the balancing pipe between the side and bunker tanks would rapidly lose water if damaged, and the fire would have to be dropped to prevent a boiler explosion. In practical terms, crews would usually fix this by having the fireman hold the point lever while the driver went through very slowly. Several modifications were made to both the class and the track to permanently fix the issue, but none were fully successful.

== Withdrawal ==
The class passed into GWR ownership in 1922 and were all scrapped in 1926. One story claims this was unintentional due to a clerical error at Swindon, but has never been confirmed.

== Numbering ==
| Year | Quantity | Manufacturer | Serial numbers | Barry numbers | GWR numbers | Notes |
|---|---|---|---|---|---|---|
| 1914 | 10 | Hawthorn Leslie | 3038–3047 | 139–148 | 1347–1355, 1357 | |
