= First class =

First class (or 1st class, Firstclass) generally implies a high level of service, importance or quality. Specific uses of the term include:

== Books and comics ==
- First Class, a comic strip in The Dandy (1983–1998)
- X-Men: First Class (comics)

== Film and TV ==
- X-Men: First Class, a 2011 film
- First Class (game show), a British game show
- First Class (TV series), a Singaporean comedy

== Music ==
=== Artists ===
- The First Class, a British pop band formed in 1974

=== Albums ===
- 1st Class (album), by Large Professor, 2002
- First Class, by Billy Paul, 1979
- First Class, by Mickey Gilley, 1977
- First Class, by Claude Bolling, 1991
- First Class, by Debby Boone, 1978

=== Songs ===
- "First Class" (song), by Jack Harlow, 2022
- "First Class", by Blueface from Find the Beat, 2020
- "First Class", by Henry Rollins from Big Ugly Mouth, 1987
- "First Class", by Khruangbin from Mordechai, 2020
- "First Class", by Kottonmouth Kings from High Society, 2000
- "First Class", by Lil Baby from Harder Than Ever, 2018
- "First Class", by Wiley from The Ascent, 2013
- "First Class", from the Hindi film Kalank, 2019
- "First Class (The Best Catalogue)", by Madlib from Beat Konducta Vol 5-6, 2009

== Computing ==
- First-class type, a concept in programming
- First class (computing), a concept in data modeling
- First-class function
- First-class object, a concept in programming
- FirstClass, e-mail and online conferencing system
- First Class Peripherals, a defunct American computer hardware manufacturer

== Leisure ==
- First Class rank, in Baden-Powell's Scout training scheme
- First Class Scout (Boy Scouts of America), rank in Boy Scouts

== Sports ==
- First-class cricket
- First Class Diver – the highest grade of diver in the original (and now obsolete) classification system of the British Sub Aqua Club

== Travel ==
- First class (aviation)
- First class travel
- FirstClass (airline), was a Finnish airline
- First-class carriage in a railway train

== Other uses ==
- First-class constraint
- First Class mail
- First class honours degree, see British undergraduate degree classification
- First class city, an income classification for cities in the Philippines
