= Beta-sandwich =

Two opposing antiparallel beta sheets that commonly occur in proteins

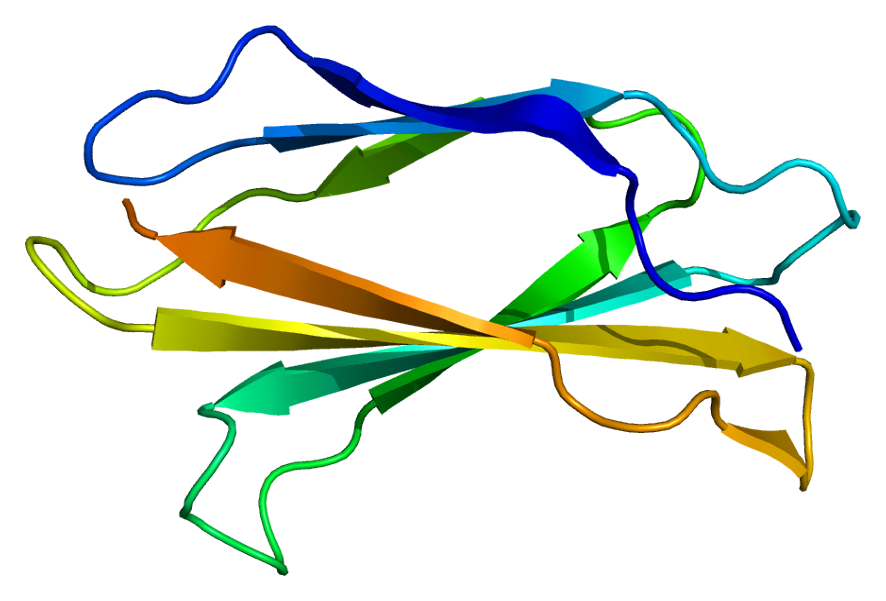
Illustration of the β-sandwich from Tenascin C (PDB entry: 1TEN).

Beta-sandwich or β-sandwich domains consisting of 80 to 350 amino acids occur commonly in proteins. They are characterized by two opposing antiparallel beta sheets (β-sheets). The number of strands found in such domains may differ from one protein to another. β-sandwich domains are subdivided in a variety of different folds. The immunoglobulin-type fold found in antibodies (Ig-fold) consists of a sandwich arrangement of 7-9 antiparallel β-strands arranged in two β-sheets with a Greek-key topology. The Greek-key topology is also found in Human Transthyretin. The jelly-roll topology is found in carbohydrate binding proteins such as concanavalin A and various lectins, in the collagen binding domain of Staphylococcus aureus Adhesin and in modules that bind fibronectin as found in Tenascin (Third Fibronectin Type III Repeat). The L-type lectin domain is a variation of the jelly roll fold. The C2 domain in its typical version (PKC-C2) is a β-sandwich composed of 8 beta-strands (β-strands).
