= Leguminous lectin family =

Lectin_legB
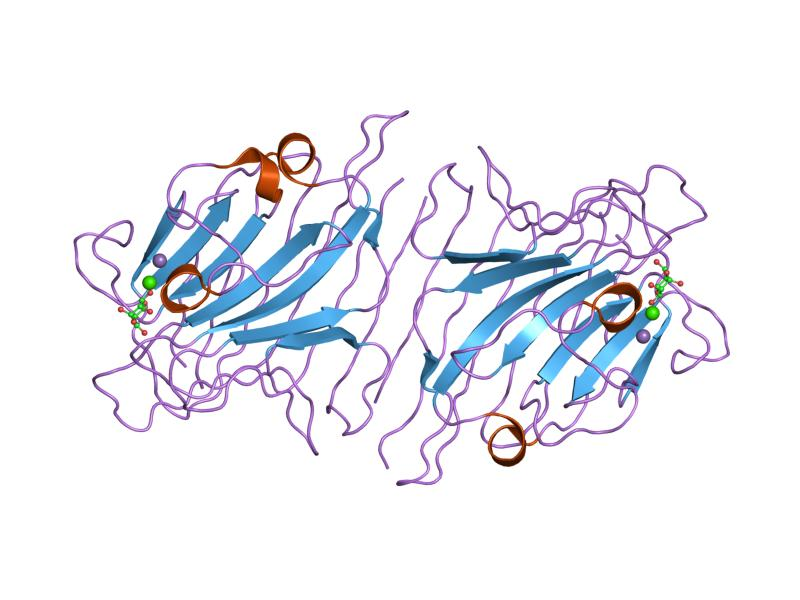
- x-ray crystal structure of a pea lectin-trimannoside complex at 2.6 angstroms resolution

Identifiers
- Symbol: Lectin_legB
- Pfam: PF00139
- Pfam clan: CL0004
- InterPro: IPR001220
- PROSITE: PDOC00278
- SCOP2: 1lem / SCOPe / SUPFAM
Available protein structures:
- PDB: IPR001220 PF00139 (ECOD; PDBsum)
- AlphaFold: IPR001220; PF00139

In molecular biology, the leguminous lectin family is a family of lectin proteins.

It is one of the largest lectin families with more than 70 lectins reported in a review in 1990. Leguminous lectins consist of two or four subunits, each containing one carbohydrate-binding site. The interaction with sugars requires tightly bound calcium and manganese ions. The structural similarities of these lectins are reported by the primary structural analyses and X-ray crystallographic studies. X-ray studies have shown that the folding of the polypeptide chains in the region of the carbohydrate-binding sites is also similar, despite differences in the primary sequences. The carbohydrate-binding sites of these lectins consist of two conserved amino acids on beta pleated sheets. One of these loops contains transition metals, calcium and manganese, which keep the amino acid residues of the sugar-binding site at the required positions. Amino acid sequences of this loop play an important role in the carbohydrate-binding specificities of these lectins. These lectins bind either glucose, mannose or galactose. The exact function of legume lectins is not known but they may be involved in the attachment of nitrogen-fixing bacteria to legumes and in the protection against pathogens.

Some legume lectins are proteolytically processed to produce two chains, beta (which corresponds to the N-terminal) and alpha (C-terminal). The lectin concanavalin A (conA) from jack bean is exceptional in that the two chains are transposed and ligated (by formation of a new peptide bond). The N terminus of mature conA thus corresponds to that of the alpha chain and the C terminus to the beta chain.
