= South Australian Railways I class (second) =

Class of Australian locomotives

South Australian Railways I class (2nd)
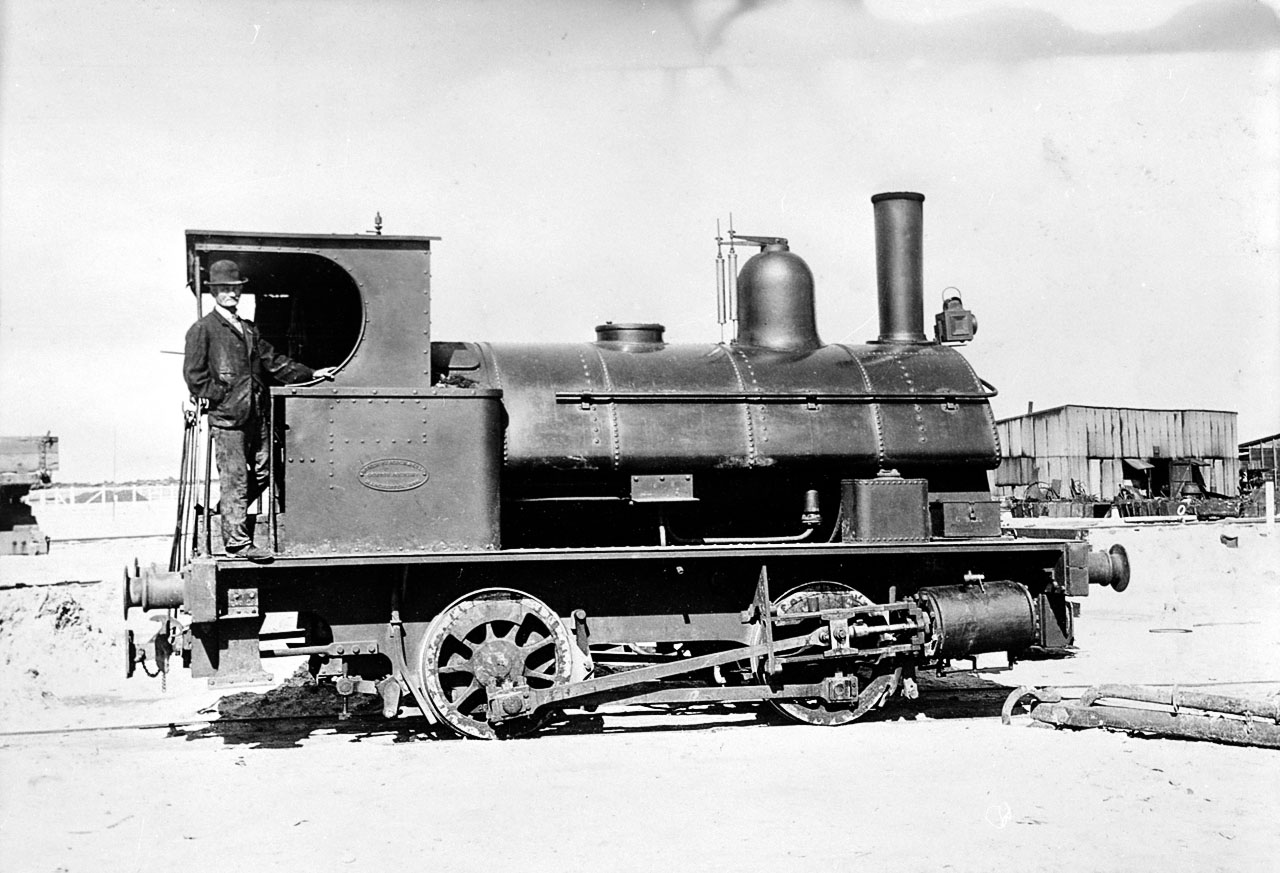
- South Australian Railways I class (2nd) No. 161
Type and origin
- Power type: Steam
- Builder: Beyer, Peacock and Company
- Serial number: 2980
- Build date: 1888
- Total produced: 1
Specifications
- Configuration
  - Whyte: 0-4-0ST
  - UIC: B T
- Gauge: 5 ft 3 in (1,600 mm)
- Driver dia.: 3 ft 0 in (910 mm)
- Length: 21 ft 5 1/2 in (6.54 m)
- Axle load: 11 long tons 6 cwt (25,300 lb or 11.5 t)
- Tender weight: 22 long tons 7 cwt (50,100 lb or 22.7 t)
- Fuel type: Coal
- Fuel capacity: 0 long tons 10 cwt (1,100 lb or 0.5 t)
- Water cap.: 500 imp gal (600 US gal; 2,300 L)
- Firebox
  - Grate area: 7.5 sq ft (0.70 m^{2})
- Boiler pressure: 145 psi (1,000 kPa)
- Heating surface
  - Firebox: 38 sq ft (3.5 m^{2})
  - Tubes: 550 sq ft (51 m^{2})
- Cylinders: 2
- Cylinder size: 12 in × 18 in (305 mm × 457 mm)
Performance figures
- Tractive effort: 8,874 lbf (39.47 kN)
Career
- Operators: South Australian Railways
- Class: I
- Numbers: 161
- Withdrawn: 1929
- Scrapped: 1930

The South Australian Railways I class locomotive entered service on the South Australian Railways as No. 161 on 9 December 1910.

== History ==
The engine was built by Beyer, Peacock and Company in 1888 and imported to Victoria, Australia. It initially worked on a private railway in Victoria, and was then sent to contractors "Waring and Rawdon" in 1903 for construction work at Outer Harbor, South Australia. After its private work years it was sold to the South Australian Government by the Engineer-in-Chief's Department. It officially entered service on the South Australian Railways on 9 December 1910 as No. 161. Between 1918 and 1919 it was then classified "I" and worked until 8 April 1929, then finally scrapped on 10 May 1930.
