= Group 1 =

Group 1 may refer to:

- Alkali metal, a chemical element classification for Alkali metal
- Group 1, the highest classification of race for thoroughbred horses
- Group 1 (motorsport), a regulation set of the FIA for series-production touring cars used in motorsport.
- Group 1 Automotive, a publicly traded car dealership group in the United States
- Group 1 Rugby League, a Rugby League Competition in New South Wales, Australia
- Fax Group 1 & Group 2 are obsolete analog standards for sending faxes
- Group 1 Software, a former mail, messaging, and document management provider company, acquired by Pitney Bowes in 2004
