= Class I =

Class I may refer to:

- Class I antiarrhythmic
- Class I electrical appliance, a device constructed according to electrical grounding specifications in the IEC 60536-2 standard
- Class I bacteriocin, a type of toxin produced by some bacteria
- Class I biosafety cabinet
- Class I laser, a type of eye-safe laser defined in the ANSI Z136 standard
- Class I rail carrier, a type of major freight railroad company in Canada
- Class I railroad, a type of major freight railroad company in the United States

== See also ==
- Class 1 (disambiguation)
- I class (disambiguation)
