= M1918 240 mm howitzer =

1910s United States 240 mm field howitzer

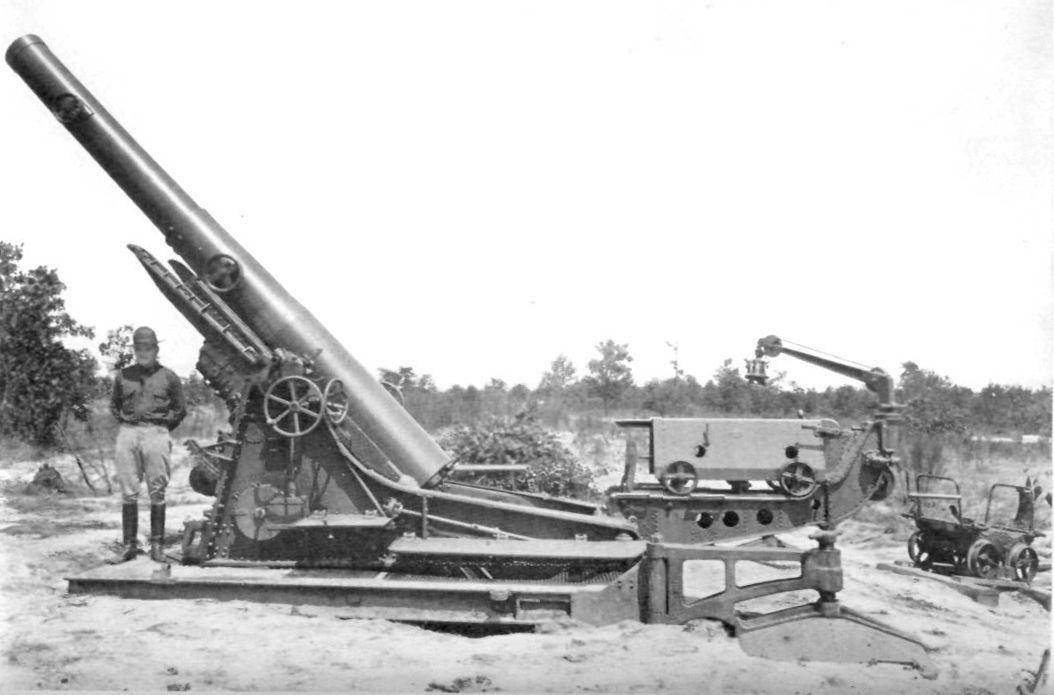
- Type: Howitzer
- Place of origin: United States

Service history
- In service: 1920s–1943
- Used by: United States

Production history
- Designed: 1917–1920s
- Produced: late 1920s
- No. built: 330

Specifications
- Mass: Combat: 41,296 lb (18,732 kg)
- Length: 16 ft 6 in (5.03 m)
- Crew: 12
- Shell: HE projectile: 345 lb (156 kg); Bagged charge: 36.5 lb (16.6 kg)
- Caliber: 240 mm (9.45 in)
- Breech: Interrupted screw
- Recoil: Hydro-pneumatic
- Carriage: steel carriage aiming box, which traverses on a ground emplacement base
- Elevation: -10° to +60°
- Traverse: 10° right or left.
- Rate of fire: 12 rounds/per hour
- Muzzle velocity: 1,700 feet/s (518 m/s)
- Effective firing range: ″×
- Maximum firing range: 9.3 miles (15 km)

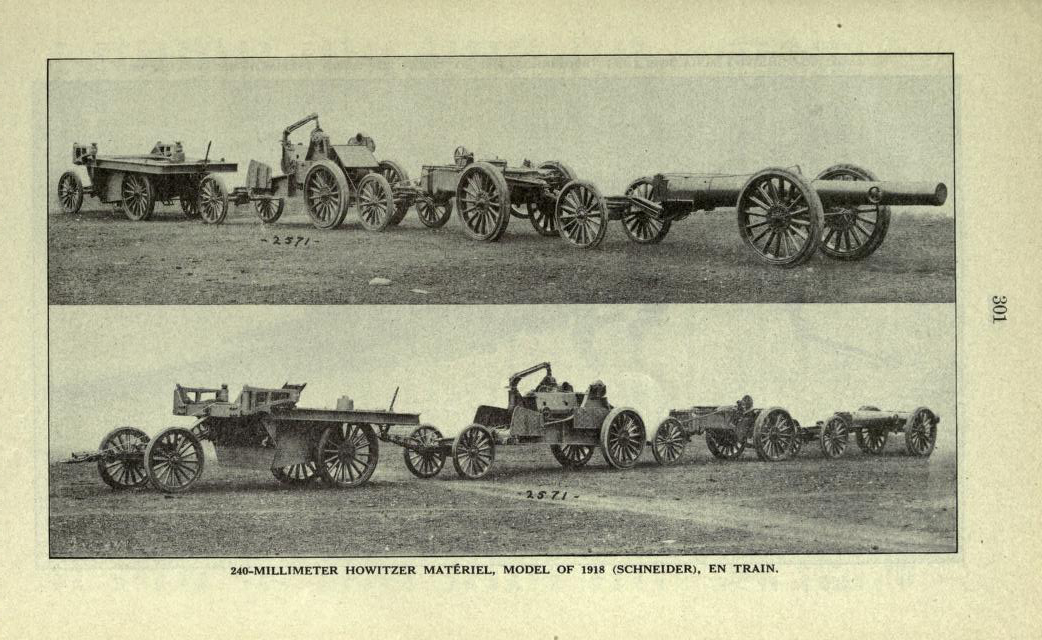
240 mm howitzer transported

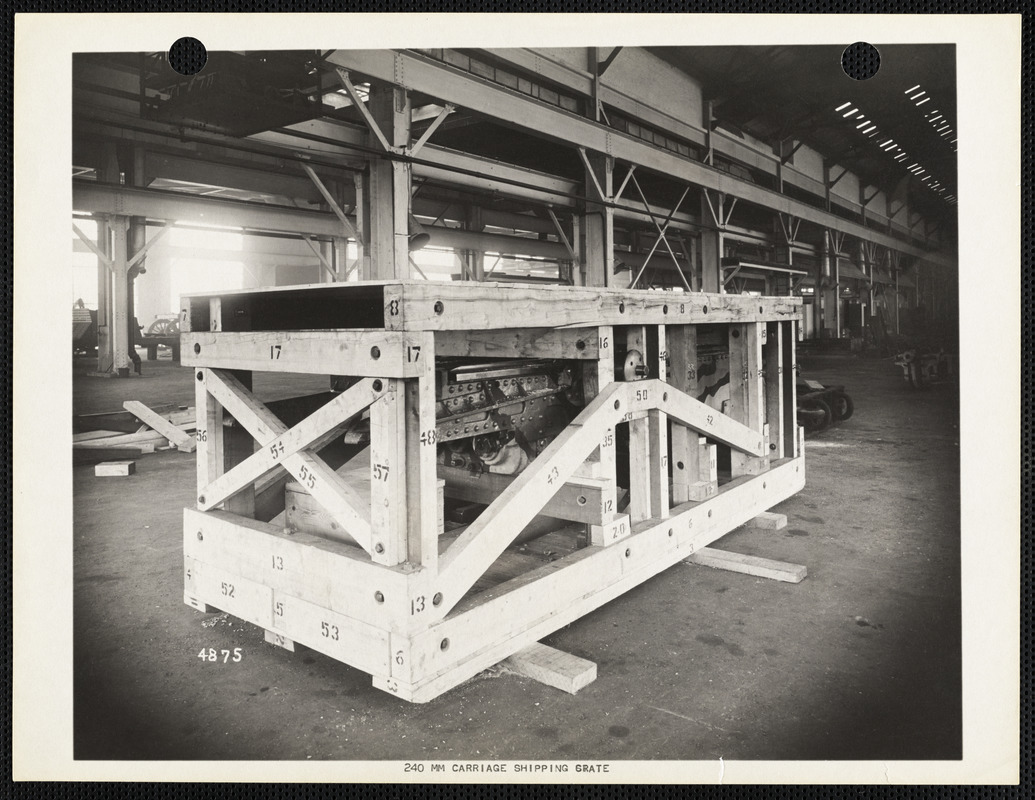
Crated for transport in the Watertown Arsenal c. 1918

The M1918 240 mm howitzer was an American heavy howitzer system manufactured in the U.S. to specifications of the U.S. Army.

== History ==
When the United States entered World War I, the U.S. Army had no modern heavy artillery that could be moved by roads. To speed the process of filling this shortcoming, the U.S. Army decided to adopt a foreign design from its Allies for manufacturing in the U.S., and set up a commission for this purpose. The decision was to adopt a 280 mm howitzer produced by the French armament firm Schneider, which was in service with the French Army during the war as the Mortier de 280 modèle 1914 Schneider. However, the U.S. Army wanted the design in 240 mm caliber. The Schneider 280 mm piece predated World War I and was originally designed and produced under a contract from the Imperial Russian Army. As requested by the U.S. government, Schneider scaled down the piece and sent drawings and technicians to the U.S. to set up production as the 240 mm howitzer M1918.

The first howitzer was not ready for proof testing until 1918, after the war had ended. When firing its first proof shot, it exploded, and production was halted while the U.S. Army and Schneider investigated the reason behind the failure and redesigned the weapon. It was not until the mid-1920s that production restarted, with 330 M1918s being produced. The M1918 became the heaviest mobile artillery piece in the U.S. Army until its replacement, the 240 mm howitzer M1, was introduced in 1943. Although significant work was done by U.S. Army engineers on the M1918 design, it never was considered suitable, but for lack of funding from Congress, they had to make do with the design.

After World War I, eleven 240 mm howitzer battalions were activated in the U.S. Army Organized Reserve. In 1933, one was disbanded and another was withdrawn from the Organized Reserve and allotted to the Regular Army as an Inactive unit. The personnel of the Organized Reserve, consisting nearly entirely of officers, were ordered to active duty individually before and during World War II, with the result being that Organized Reserve units did not see active service organized as such, and remained "paper" units with no personnel until ordered into active military service and organized. Only one of the regiments was ordered into active military service during World War II as a segregated 8-inch howitzer unit; it was thereafter broken up into battalions. The other regiments were disbanded without seeing active service.

U.S. Army interwar 240 mm howitzer units
Unit	Active	Inactivated
495th Field Artillery Regiment	1922–1933	Demobilized 1 October 1933
496th Field Artillery Regiment	1922–1929	Inactivated by relief of personnel about August 1929; disbanded 26 January 1943
497th Field Artillery Regiment	1923–1943	Disbanded 26 January 1943
498th Field Artillery Regiment	1923–1924; 1925–1928	Inactivated by relief of personnel about April 1928; disbanded 26 January 1943
499th Field Artillery Regiment	1923–1928	Inactivated by relief of personnel about April 1928; disbanded 26 January 1943
500th Field Artillery Regiment	1922–1936; 1937–1943	Disbanded 26 January 1943
560th Field Artillery Regiment	1924–1943	Disbanded 26 January 1943
565th Field Artillery Regiment	1926–1943	Disbanded 26 January 1943
576th Field Artillery Regiment	1922–1927	Inactivated by relief of personnel about December 1927; disbanded 26 January 1943
578th Field Artillery Regiment	1922–1943	Ordered into active military service 15 July 1942 as a segregated 8-inch howitzer unit; broken up 23 February 1943
579th Field Artillery Regiment	1921–?	The U.S. Army Reserve's 579th Field Artillery Battalion (inactive as of 2001) traced its lineage to this unit

In 1923, twelve of these weapons were on a ship bound for the Philippines when the Washington Naval Treaty went into effect, prohibiting additional fortifications in the Pacific. The ship was ordered to deliver the weapons to Hawaii instead. Thus, at least 12 of these weapons were present on fixed mountings on Oahu during the attack on Pearl Harbor. It is unknown whether any M1918s saw combat service during World War II, but it is unlikely due to its range and vulnerability to counter battery fire.

== Description ==
The M1918 was similar to most mobile siege cannons of World War I. With the exception of the caliber and a few minor details, it was an exact copy of the French 280 mm howitzer. It was moved in four large sections by heavy tracked 10-ton Artillery Tractors. There was also a fifth large load for the erection of the frame and other items needed to assemble the four main cannon components from their specialized transport wagons. The total weight of the five loads was 21.5 tons and was limited to a road speed of only 5 miles per hour. The first load was the 16-1/2 foot cannon barrel, the second load was the recoil mechanism, the third load was the carriage-aiming mount and the fourth the ground base. After a site was chosen, installation began with the handheld-tool digging of a large recoil pit, and then assembly of an iron beam erection structure over the emplacement pit. Under the best conditions, installation required four to six hours.

== See also ==
- List of U.S. Army weapons by supply catalog designation (SNL D-4)
