= M4 tractor =

M4 tractor, high speed, 18 tons
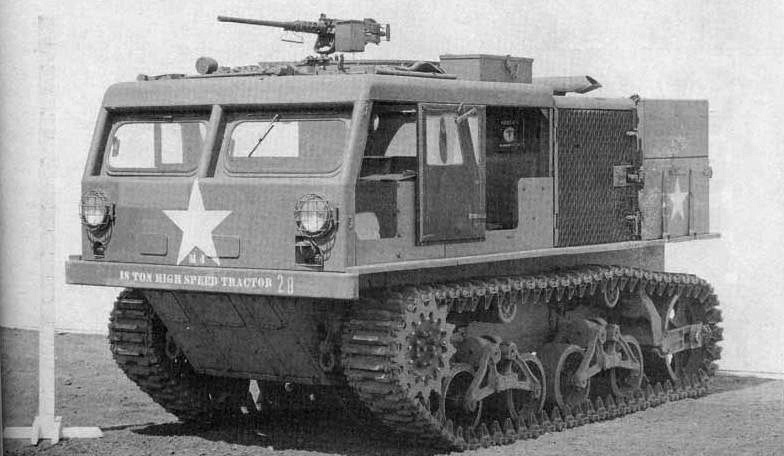
- M4 high-speed tractor with 90 mm ammo box
- Type: Artillery tractor
- Place of origin: United States

Service history
- In service: 1943–1960
- Used by: US Army; Belgian Army; JGSDF
- Wars: World War II; 1965 India Pakistan War

Production history
- Designed: 1942
- Manufacturer: Allis-Chalmers
- Produced: March 1943 – August 1945
- No. built: 5,811
- Variants: 90 mm antiaircraft gun tractor 155 mm gun or 8-inch howitzer tractor

Specifications
- Mass: 31,400 lb (14.2 t)
- Length: 210 in (5.33 m)
- Width: 97 in (2.46 m)
- Height: 99 in (2.51 m)
- Crew: 1 + 11
- Main armament: M2 Browning machine gun
- Engine: Waukesha 145GZ OHV I6 gasoline engine 210 hp (157 kW)
- Power/weight: 14.70 hp/t
- Suspension: Horizontal volute spring
- Operational range: 100 mi (160 km)
- Maximum speed: 35 mph (56 km/h)

The M4 high-speed tractor for World War II was an artillery tractor used by the US Army from 1943.

== Design and development ==
The M4 high-speed tractor used M4 Sherman tracks, road wheels, and drive sprocket. However, the suspension was an early variation of the Horizontal Volute Spring Suspension (HVSS) very different from the HVSS that eventually was used on Shermans. Contrary to popular misconceptions the M4 HST was not related to the light tank or M3 Stuart.

One variant was designed to tow the 90 mm anti-aircraft gun, and another was for the 155 mm gun or 8-inch howitzer. The rear compartment carried the gun crew and other equipment and some later variants included a crane to assist with heavier projectiles. Two types of ammunition boxes were used on all models: a 90 mm box with side "tailgates" to access 90 mm shells pigeon-holed in the sides, and a combination box for 155 mm or 8-inch ammunition.

== History ==
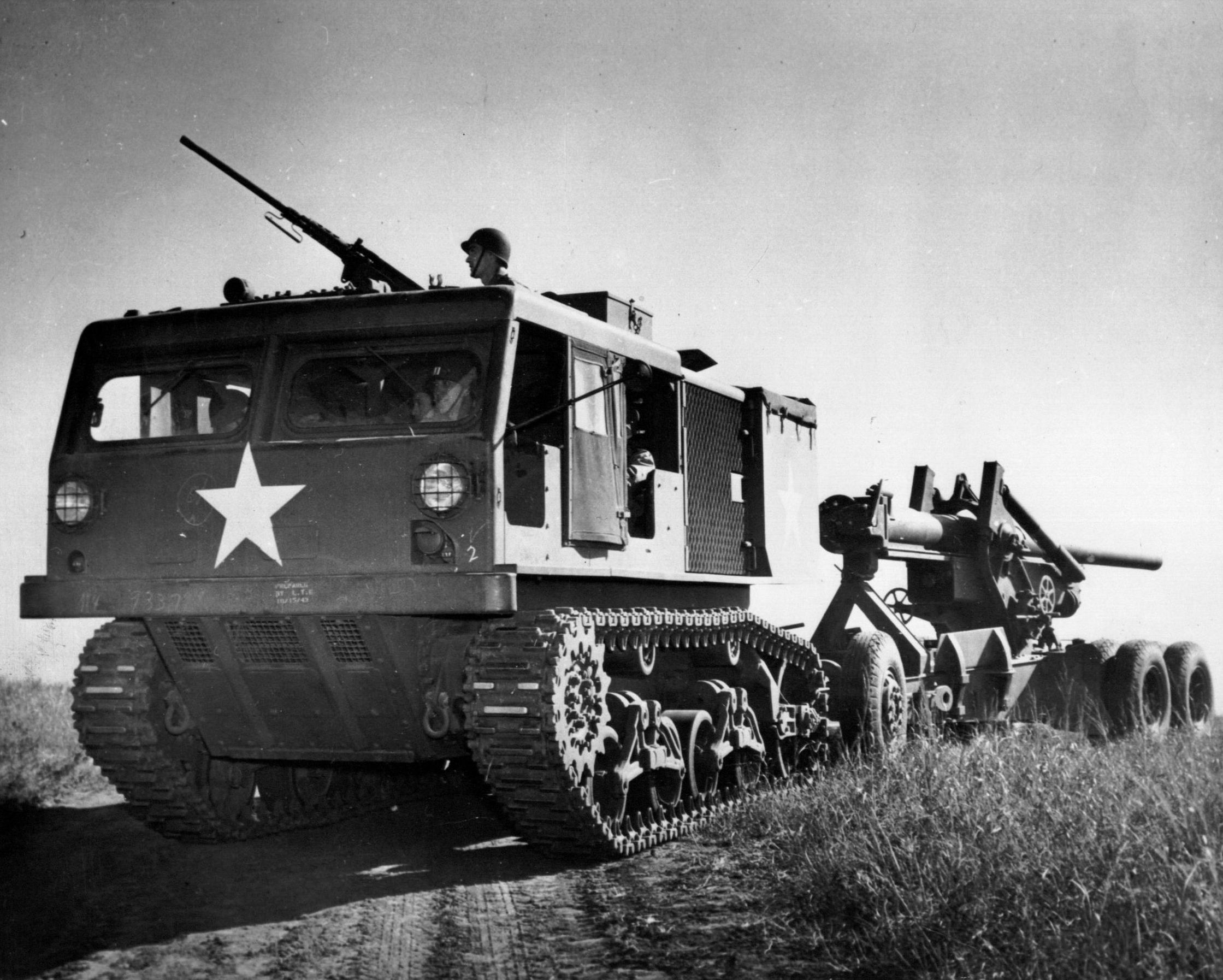
155 mm Long Tom howitzer towed behind an M4 high-speed tractor

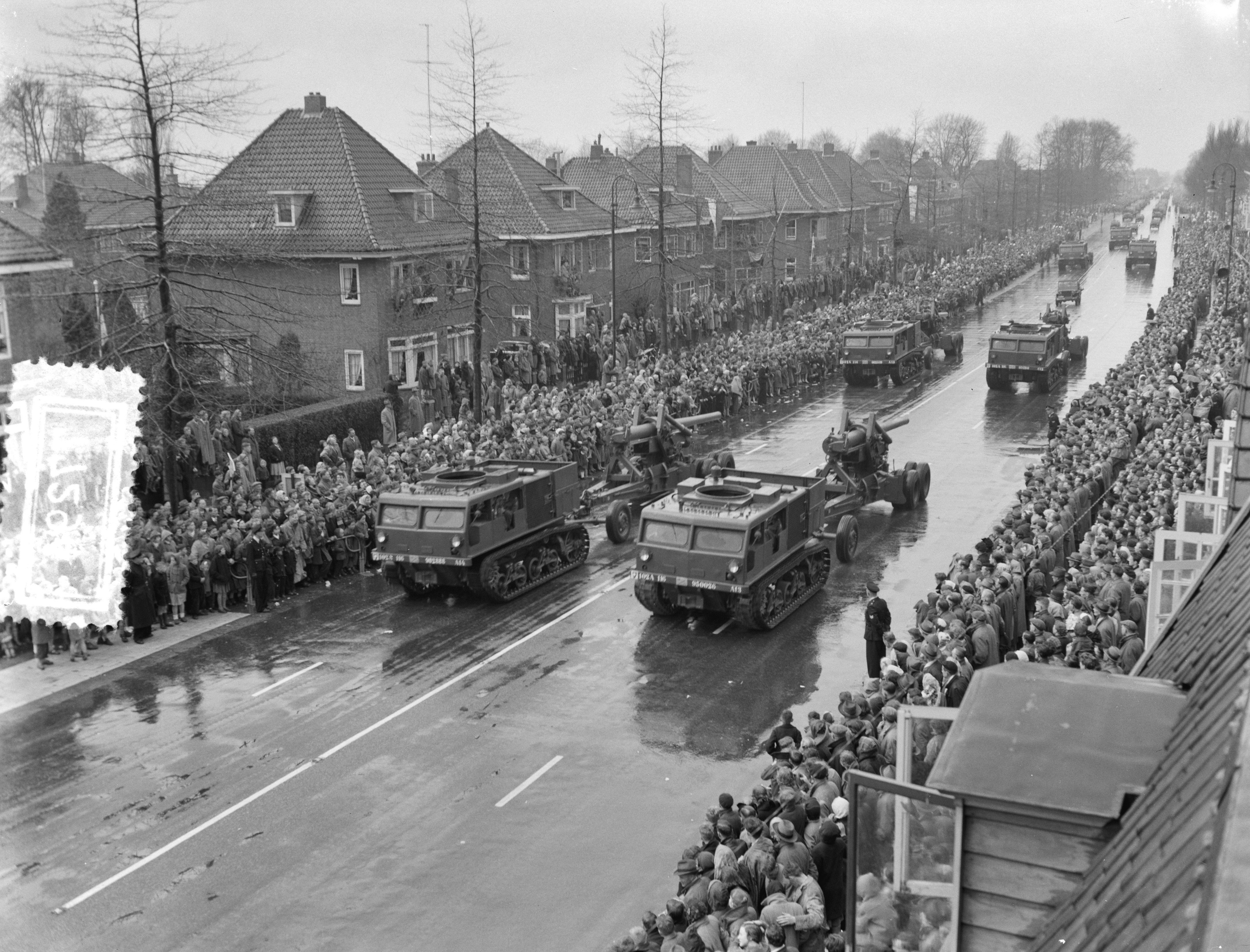
Dutch M4 tractor and M115 howitzer, 1956.

The M4 was built by tractor manufacturer Allis-Chalmers of West Allis, Wisconsin, starting in 1943 and was in U.S. military service until approximately 1960. After WWII, under the US Mutual Defense Assistance Program, M4s were supplied to Greece, the Netherlands, Japan, Brazil, Yugoslavia and Pakistan and several other states friendly to the USA. In the Indo-Pakistani War of 1965, the Pakistani Army used M4 tractors to haul their M115 howitzers to the battlefield of Chamb and then to the front at Lahore during the fighting with Indian troops.

== Variants ==
- M4: base model. 2,464 were configured to tow the 90 mm antiaircraft gun, while 3,088 were configured to tow the 155 mm gun or 8-inch howitzer
- M4C: The "C" designation indicates spare ammunition racks configured in the crew compartment.
- M4A1: The "A1" modification designates the wider suspension used for the "duck bill" tracks mirroring the E9 modification on Sherman tanks. 259 were built in 1945, and were used post-war as a prime mover for the M23 ammunition trailer in M40 gun motor carriage sections.

== Civilian use ==
After the war many types of these tractors were stripped of their military components and used for log skidders and power line construction. Many were used as carriers for rock drills, used in logging road construction in British Columbia. The first prototype was designed in the early 1960s by G.M. Philpott Ltd. of Vancouver, BC, and Scott-Douglas Industries, who supplied the M4 Carrier. It was used by MacMillan, Bloedel, and Powell River Company at their Juskatla, BC logging operation. Many improvements were made and when Finning Tractor later bought G.M. Philpott, the machine became the Finning Tank Drill. At least 500 were built, many of which are still in service. The original Finning Tank Drill was replaced by the M32F and M40F Tank Drills, which used larger Sherman tank carriers.

At Amsterdam Airport Schiphol in the Netherlands, at least two refurbished M4s were used by the airport fire brigade in the 1960s and '70s. During the mid-80s and into the early 90s, many M-4s were converted into exhibition vehicles used for car crushing and dubbed "monster tanks", William Townes's "Virginia Beach Beast" Chevrolet K-5 Blazer being among the first.

== Surviving vehicles ==
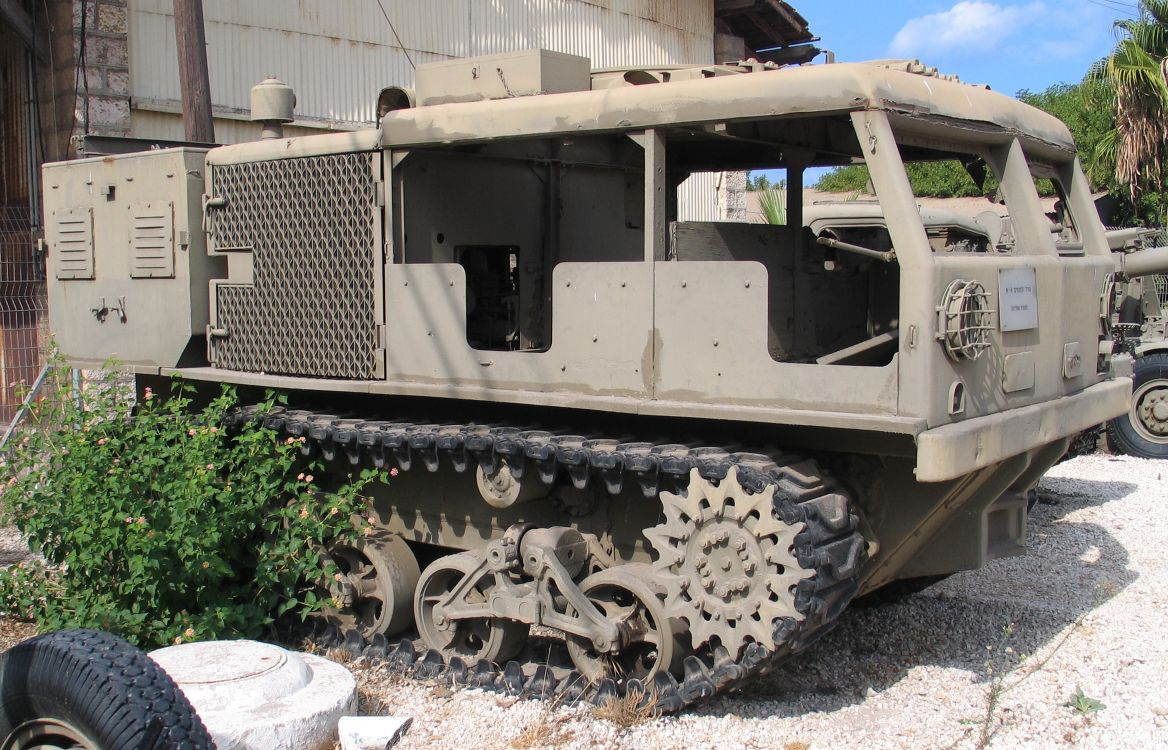
An M4 at Batey ha-Osef Museum, Tel Aviv, 2005

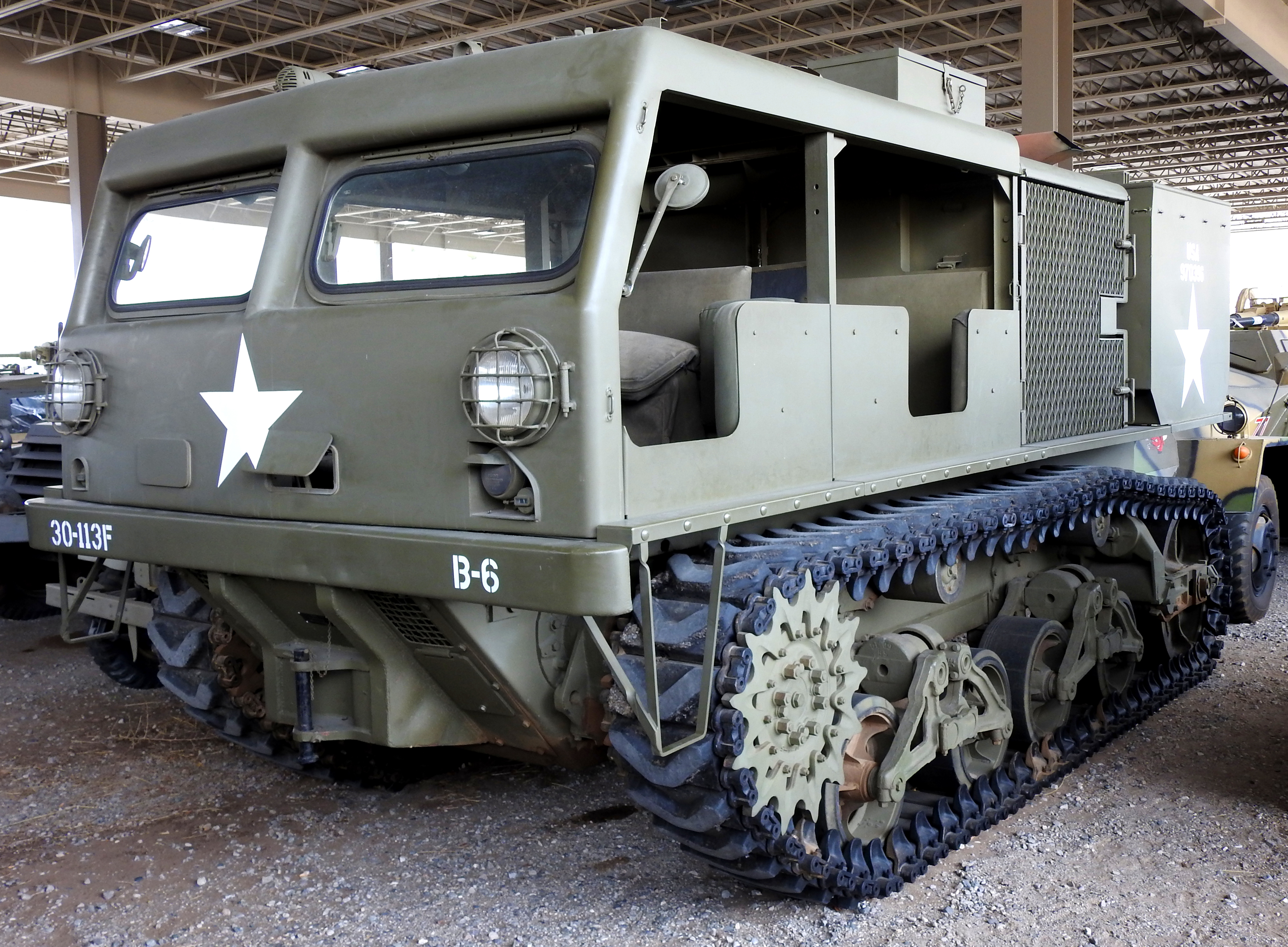
M4 high-speed tractor at the National Museum of Military Vehicles

- Robert Gill Collection militarymuseum.at, Vienna, Austria
- Armed Forces Military Museum, Largo, Florida.2 pieces in the Robert Gill Collection militarymuseum.at, Vienna Austria
- Fort Sill Museum, Oklahoma
- Gunfire Museum, Brasschaat, Belgium
- National Military Museum in Soesterberg, https://collectie.nmm.nl/nl/collectie/detail/270474/The Netherlands
- Batey ha-Osef Museum, Tel Aviv, Israel
- Heartland Museum of Military Vehicles in Lexington, Nebraska
- Marshall Museum in Lexington, Virginia
- private collection in Colorado
- private collection in Gettysburg, Pennsylvania
- private collection in Grand Prairie, Texas
- private collection in Leicestershire, UK
- Royal Dutch Army historical collection Maaldrift, The Netherlands
- private collection in Molsheim, France
- private collection in O'Neill, Nebraska
- private collection in Orlando, Florida
- private collection in Troyes, France
- private collection in National Military Vehicle Museum, South Australia
- private collection in Sydney Australia as of April 2022
- Kansas Army National Guard Museum in Topeka, Kansas

== See also ==
- List of U.S. military vehicles by supply catalog designation (G150)
- List of U.S. military vehicles by model number
- M5 tractor
- M6 tractor
- Raupenschlepper, Ost
