= 267th Field Artillery Battalion =

American Army artillery battalion

- Active: 1943–1957
- Disbanded: December 1, 1957. Replaced by 288th Armored Field Artillery Battalion
- Country: United States
- Branch: United States Army
- Type: Field artillery
- Part of: 402nd Field Artillery Group, XII Corps, Second Army (WWII)
- Equipment: 240 mm howitzer M1 (WWII), M114 155 mm howitzer (Cold War)

The 267th Field Artillery Battalion (267th FAB) was a Field Artillery battalion of the United States Army during World War II. During the Cold War, it was briefly reactivated as the 267th Armored Field Artillery Battalion (267th AFAB).

== World War II ==
=== Formation and training ===
On 25 January 1943, the 267th Field Artillery Battalion was constituted in the Army of the United States; it was activated on 1 March at Camp Shelby. The 267th FAB, under the command of Lieutenant Colonel Walter Hinsch, was a truck drawn 105 mm howitzer, nondivisional unit assigned to the Third Army. Attached to the 403rd Field Artillery Group of XIX Corps, it was officered by reservists and recent graduates of the Field Artillery Officer Candidate School at Fort Sill, and manned by Georgia National Guardsmen transferred from the 179th Field Artillery Group and Selective Service draftees from the Field Artillery Replacement Training Centers at Fort Bragg and Fort Sill. The battalion spent most of the year training at Camp Shelby.

On 26 December it was transferred to Fort Bragg, North Carolina, and assigned to the 402nd Field Artillery Group of XII Corps, part of the Second Army. At Fort Bragg, the 267th converted to the 240 mm howitzer M1, the largest field artillery piece excluding railway guns fielded by the United States Army during the war. It was one of fifteen 240mm howitzer battalions fielded by the United States during the war. Between 23 April and 5 May 1944, the 267th FAB staged for deployment at Fort Slocum, Fort Dix, and Camp Kilmer. At Fort Dix the 267th resumed intensive training, then awaited transportation at Camp Kilmer until 22 July.

=== Overseas service and demobilization ===
The battalion crossed the Atlantic aboard the RMS Queen Mary, arriving in England on 28 July. While awaiting movement to France, the 267th stayed in temporary quarters at Bude. The battalion crossed the English Channel from Weymouth aboard LSTs and LCTs on 1 September and had landed at Utah Beach in its entirety by 4 September, with the elements aboard the LCTs having been delayed by a storm. Between 5 September and 17 December, the battalion provided artillery support for the Third Army during its advance to the Rhine across Northern France. From 17 December to the end of the war, it was relieved from XII Corps and placed on special duty with the Third Army Provost Marshal, guarding bridges and handling prisoners of war in the army area.

On 19 May the 267th moved forward to Auerbach, where it guarded a prisoner of war camp for captured German troops. The battalion was ordered transferred to the South West Pacific to participate in the invasion of Japan by an order of 1 August, but the order was cancelled due to the surrender of Japan. The 267th returned to the United States on 11 February 1946 and was inactivated the following day at Camp Kilmer.

For its service in Europe, the battalion was authorized four campaign streamers including: Northern France, Rhineland, Ardennes-Alsace and Central Europe. In the European Theater of Operation the Battalion had two men wounded and none killed. Three officers received the Air Medal. Four officers and 48 enlisted men received Bronze Star Medals, and two enlisted men received Purple Heart Medals.

== Cold War ==
On 31 January 1949, the 267th was redesignated as the 971st Field Artillery Battalion and allotted to the Organized Reserve Corps. It was activated at Newark, New Jersey on 7 March 1949, inactivating there on 12 July 1950. The battalion was again redesignated as the 267th FAB on 14 March 1952. On 14 January 1955, it was redesignated as the 267th Armored Field Artillery Battalion and transferred to the Regular Army.

On 7 March 1955, the 267th AFAB was reactivated at Fort Sill, equipped with M114 155 mm howitzer. It deployed to Babenhausen Germany on 1 April 1956, replacing the 597th Armored Field Artillery Battalion and was inactivated on 1 December 1957 in Germany.

It departed Fort Sill on 3/27/1956 heading for Hanau, Germany on 4/1/1956 after sailing from NY City to Bremehaven Germany. This was part of Operation Gyroscope. It was stationed in Babenhausen and attached to the 36th Field Artillery Group. The Battalion was inactivated in Germany on 12/1/1957 when it was replaced by the 288th Armored Field Artillery Battalion.
