= M5 tractor =

World War II era artillery tractor

M5 high-speed tractor
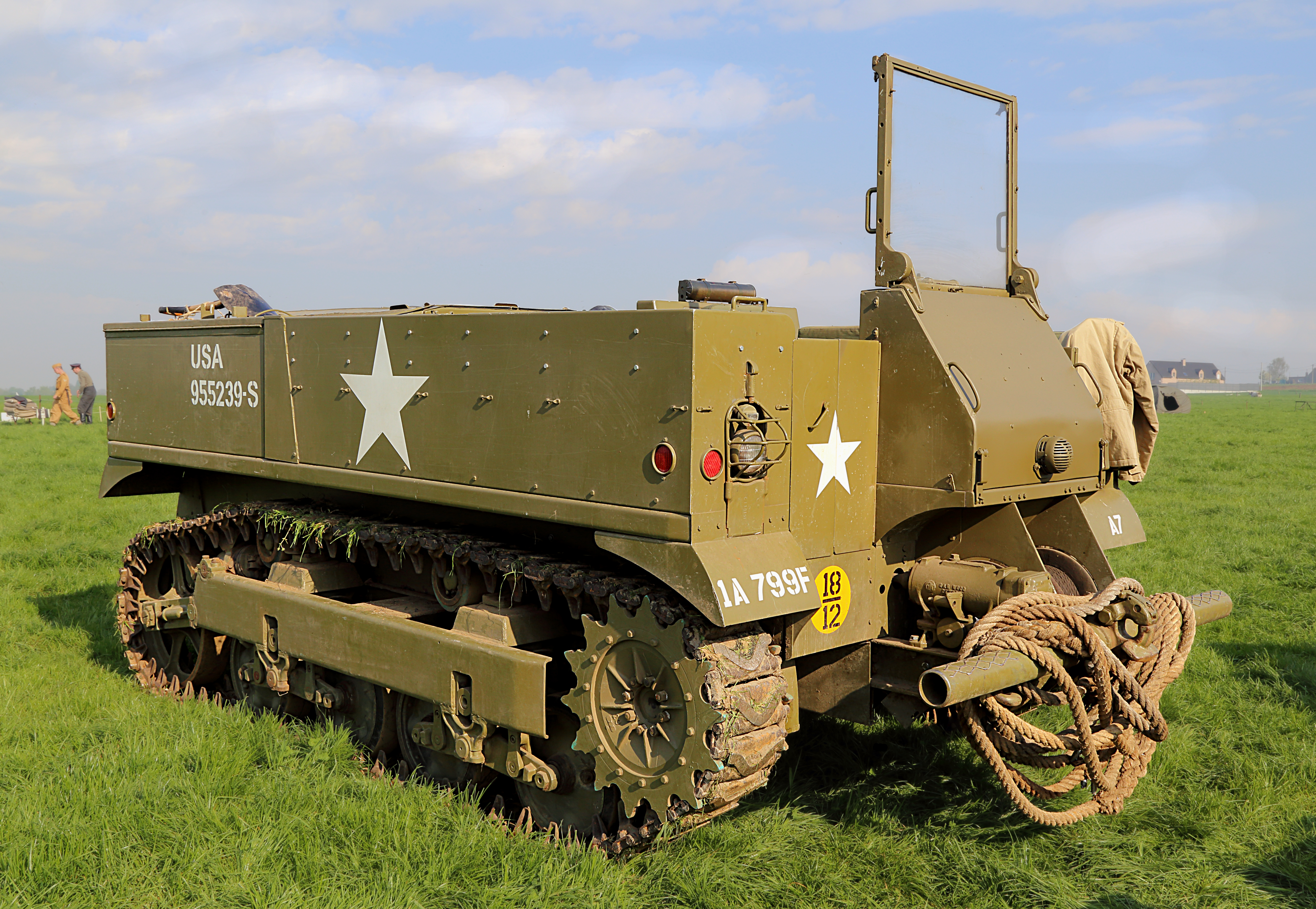
- M5 tractor
- Type: Artillery tractor
- Place of origin: United States

Service history
- Used by: US Army; Belgian Army; Japan Self-Defense Forces; Austrian Armed Forces; Yugoslav People's Army; Lebanese Army; Pakistan Army; Spanish Army
- Wars: World War II; Korean War; 1958 Lebanon crisis Lebanese Civil War

Production history
- Designed: 1942
- Manufacturer: International Harvester
- Produced: May 1943-September 1945
- No. built: 5,873
- Variants: 5

Specifications
- Mass: 27,600 lb (12,500 kg)
- Length: 5.03 m (16 ft 6 in)
- Width: 2.54 m (8 ft 4 in)
- Height: 2.69 m (8 ft 10 in)
- Crew: 1 + 10
- Armor: none
- Main armament: 1 x M2 Browning machine gun
- Engine: Continental R6572 six-cylinder petrol engine 235 hp (175 kW) at 2,900 rpm
- Power/weight: 15.0 hp/t
- Suspension: VVSS
- Operational range: 125 mi (201 km)
- Maximum speed: 35 mph (56 km/h)

The M5 13-ton high-speed tractor was an artillery tractor introduced in 1942 by the US Army to tow medium field artillery pieces.

== Design ==
The M5 high-speed tractor was a fully tracked artillery tractor designed to tow artillery pieces that weighed up to 16,000 pounds (7,300 kg) and to carry the gun's ammunition, the crew, and their equipment.

The M5 was developed from the prototype T13 high-speed tractor. Both vehicles used the Continental R6572 in-line six-cylinder petrol engine, which developed 235 horsepower (175 kW) at 2,900 rpm, derived their tracks and vertical volute spring suspension from the Stuart tank. The M5 could travel 35 miles per hour (56 km/h) on roads with a range of 125 miles (201 km).

To help move and place its gun, the M5 high-speed tractor had a front-mounted engine-driven winch that could pull 17,000 pounds (7,700 kg). A roller below the winch allowed it to tow loads behind the tractor.

== Production ==
The design of the M5 high-speed tractor was standardized in October 1942, with production by International Harvester. The design evolved into five marks. The M5 was accepted into US Army service as the standard gun tractor used to tow the 105 mm Howitzer M2, the 4.5-inch gun M1 and the 155 mm howitzer M1. Standard ammunition stowage was:

- 105 mm howitzer M2: 56 rounds
- 4.5-inch gun M1: 38 rounds
- 155 mm howitzer M1: 24 rounds

=== M5 high-speed tractor ===
The original M5 high-speed tractor was produced from May 1943 to May 1945 for a total of 5,290 tractors. They had a simple folding top with side curtains for the protection of the gun crew from the elements, the driver was located in the front centre and there were inwards facing seats for total crew of 9. After 1944, the vehicles were fitted with the M49C ring mount that allowed it to be armed with an M2 Browning machine gun for local and air defence.

=== M5A1 high-speed tractor ===
Introduced in May 1945, the M5A1 high-speed tractor had a new steel cab with a front-left seat for the driver and crew seating for 10 more. A total of 589 M5A1s were produced before production ceased in August 1945.

=== M5A2 and M5A3 high-speed tractors ===
Introduced after WWII, the M5A2 high-speed tractor and M5A3 high-speed tractor were updated M5s and M5A1s with a horizontal volute spring suspension system instead of the original vertical volute spring suspension and new tracks that were 21 inches (53 cm) wide compared to the older tracks that were 11.625 inches (295.3 mm) wide.

=== M5A4 high-speed tractor ===
The M5A4 high-speed tractor reorganised the ammunition stowage boxes along the sides of the vehicle for easier access.

== Users ==
=== World War II ===
The M5 high-speed tractor entered service with the US Army in 1943 and was one of the primary medium artillery prime movers along with the GMC CCKW 2½-ton 6x6 truck and the Diamond T 4-ton 6x6 truck. In 1944, 200 M5s were provided to an appreciative Soviet Union for use by the Red Army who quickly rushed them into service.

=== Post-war ===
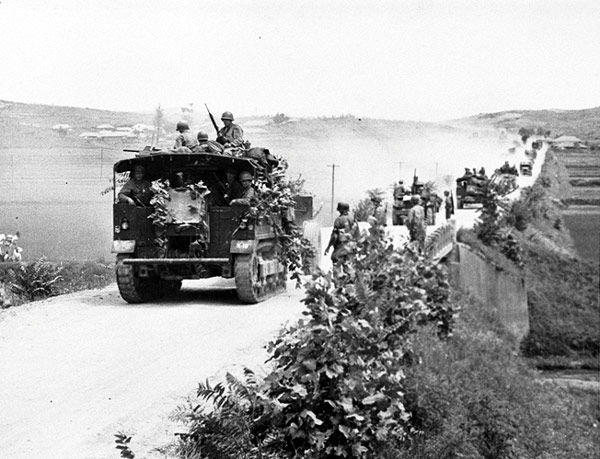
M5 tractor in Korea.

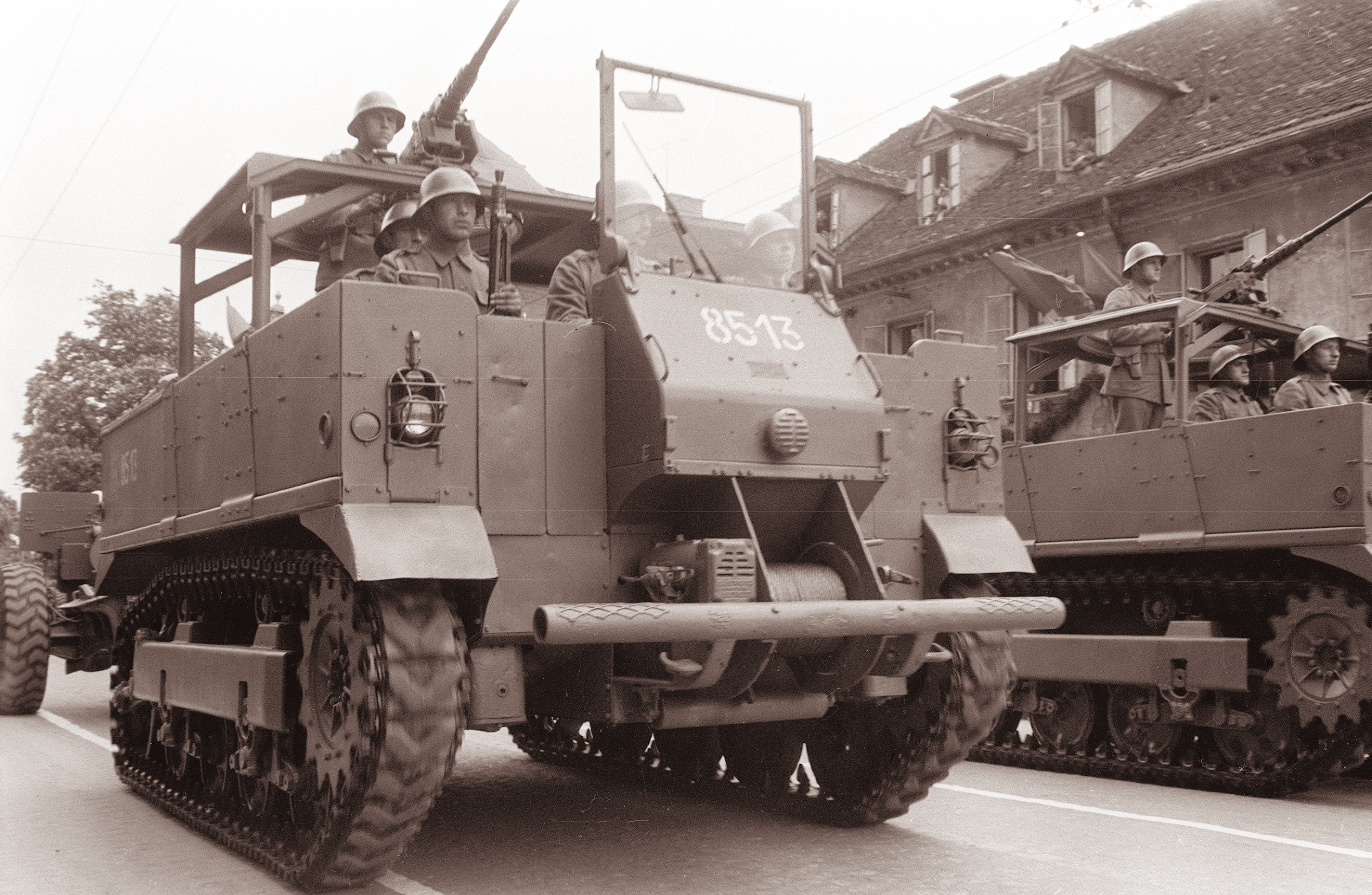
M5 on May parade, Ljubljana 1961

The US Army continued to use the M5 during the Korean War, retiring them shortly afterwards. Post-war surplus M5s were supplied to Austria, Belgium, Japan, Lebanon, Pakistan and Yugoslavia.

A number of M5 Tractors were used in British Columbia, Canada, as carriers for rock drills. The Chapman "Drilmobile", manufactured by Chapman Motor & Machine Shop of Delta, British Columbia was designed specifically for logging road construction.

== Surviving examples ==
Surviving examples of the M5 high-speed tractors of various marks can be seen at:

- 2 pieces in the Robert Gill Collection militarymuseum.at, Vienna, Austria
- Marshall Museum, Lexington, Virginia.
- 45th Infantry Division Museum, Oklahoma City.
- Museum of the American G.I., College Station, Texas.
- Armourgeddon Tank Driving, Husbands Bosworth, Leicestershire, England.
- Museum of the Kansas National Guard, Topeka, Kansas.
- Arkansas National Guard Museum, Little Rock, Arkansas.
- Lewis Army Museum, Fort Lewis, Washington.
- A mostly intact but rusting M5 or M5A4 Tractor, complete with Continental engine, PTO winch, six 5-round side-mount ammunition lockers, and M2 Browning ring-mount can be found parked beside Route 96 in New York state, a few miles east of the town of Phelps. It has been recently removed from this location and its whereabouts are unknown.

== See also ==
- List of U.S. military vehicles by supply catalog designation
- List of U.S. military vehicles by model number
- M4 tractor
- M6 tractor
