= M6 tractor =

M6 high-speed tractor
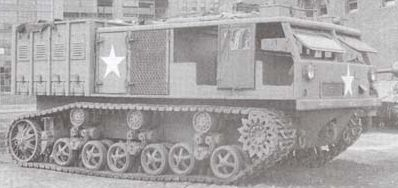
- Wartime photo of a M6 tractor
- Type: Artillery tractor
- Place of origin: United States

Service history
- Used by: US Army
- Wars: World War II

Production history
- Manufacturer: Allis-Chalmers
- Produced: February 1944-August 1945
- No. built: 1,235

Specifications
- Mass: 76,000 lb (34.5 t)
- Length: 21 ft 6 in (6.55 m)
- Width: 10 ft 0 in (3.05 m)
- Height: 8 ft 8 in (2.64 m)
- Crew: 11
- Main armament: .50 cal (12.7 mm) M2 machine gun
- Engine: 2 × Waukesha 145GZ 6-cylinder gasoline engine 2 × 190 hp (140 kW) at 2,100 rpm
- Suspension: Horizontal Volute Spring Suspension
- Operational range: 110 mi (180 km)
- Maximum speed: 21 mph (34 km/h)

The M6 high-speed tractor was an artillery tractor used by the US Army during World War II.

Manufactured by Allis-Chalmers, it was used to tow heavy artillery pieces, such as the 8-inch Gun M1 and 240 mm howitzer M1. Its G-number was (G-184).

== Development ==
Although in the late 1930s the US Army lacked a clear mechanization policy, the success of the "blitzkrieg" in 1939-40 highlighted the need of motorized vehicles for both tactical and strategic maneuver, which meant that towed artillery would need to move at a speed comparable to that of the armored fighting vehicles.

To achieve this, a series of high-speed tractor was planned, which would tow the different artillery pieces existing (or planned) in the US Army inventory. The "high" speed was considered in comparison with horse-drawn artillery rather than that obtainable with wheeled prime movers or ballast tractors. The models considered in the series included: 7 ton, 13 ton, 18 ton, and 38 ton.

Intended to tow heavy artillery pieces such as the 240 mm howitzer M1 and the 8-inch Gun M1, the M6 tractor was larger and heavier than the M4 tractor, although they had a similar layout. The main differences between both were in the following areas:

- Running gear (6 running wheels in the M6, instead of 4 wheels in the M4)
- Dimensions
- Weight
- Towing capacity
- Engine

It was powered by two six-cylinder, in-line, Waukesha 145GZ gasoline engines with an engine displacement of 13.4 L (820 cu in), each of which gave 190 hp (140 kW) at 2,100 rev/min. The running gear consisted on six rubber-rimmed wheels per side, with the drive wheel located at the front and a large tensioning wheel at the rear; a layout similar to the one used in the M3 light tank and later in the M4 tractor.

== Service history ==
The M6 tractor was chiefly used in the European theater only in the last months of World War II. Until then large caliber artillery was moved by the M1 heavy tractor, heavy trucks, or vehicles such as the M33 Prime Mover, M34 Prime Mover or M35 Prime Mover derived from the M3 Medium Tank, M4 Medium Tank, and M10 GMC hulls respectively

Use of this tractor in the Pacific theater seems to have been limited to training at Oahu (Hawaii).

Some vehicles were sold to Israel after being replaced by self-propelled artillery.

== Users ==
- US Army

== Surviving vehicles ==
- Overloon War Museum, Netherlands

National Military Vehicle Museum, Edinburgh, South Australia

== Gallery ==
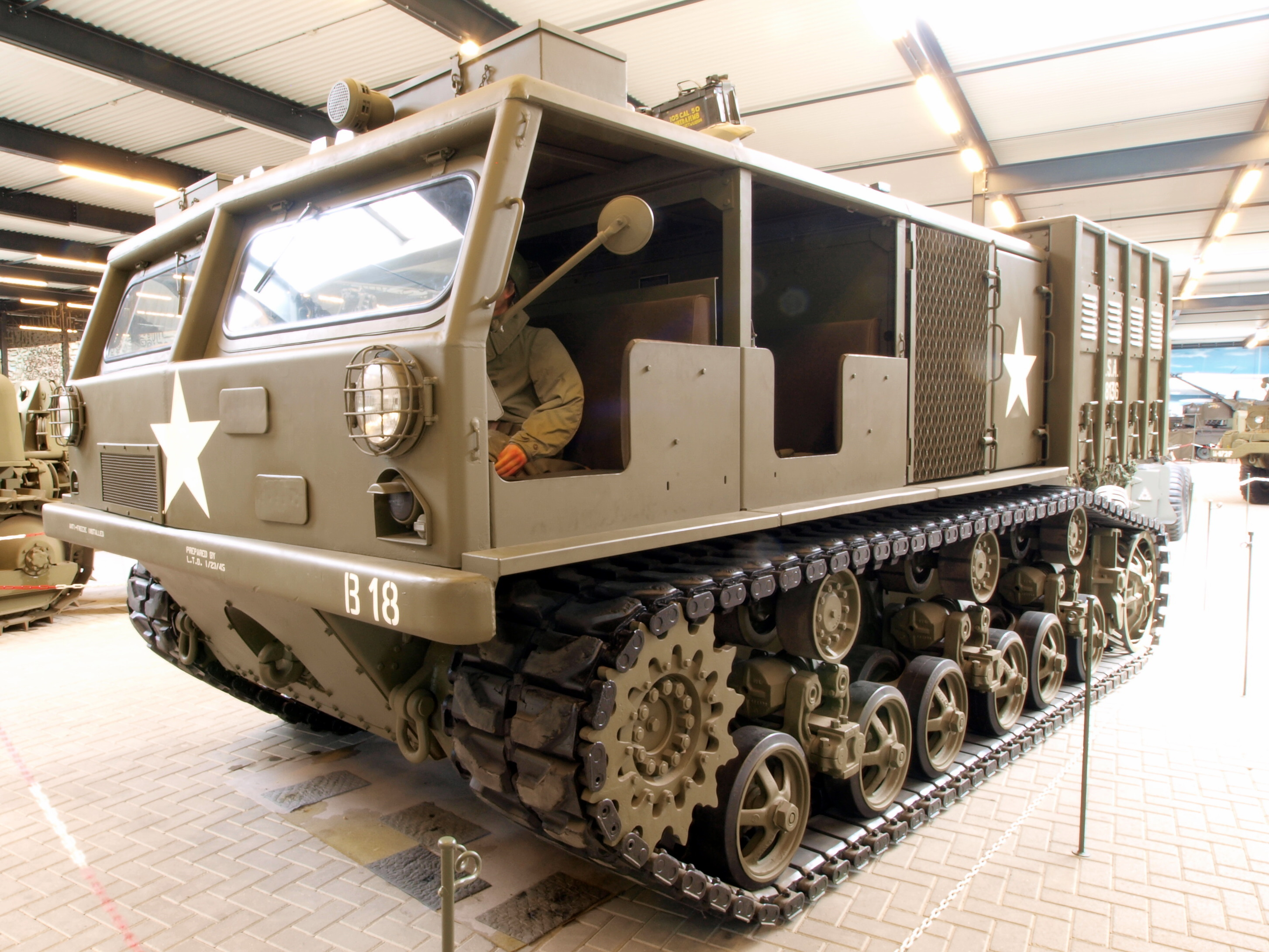
M6 tractor, Overloon

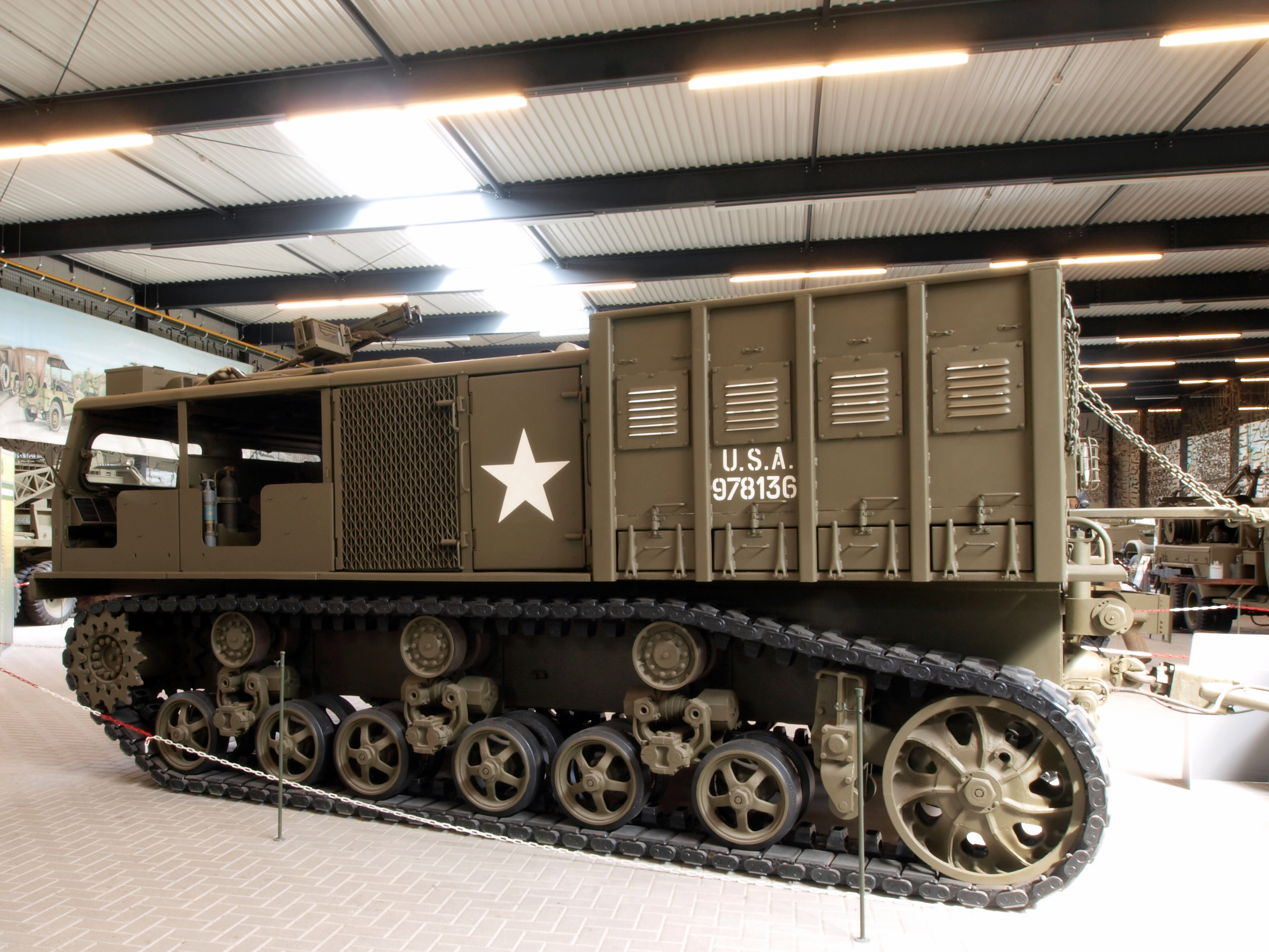
Side view, M6 tractor, Overloon

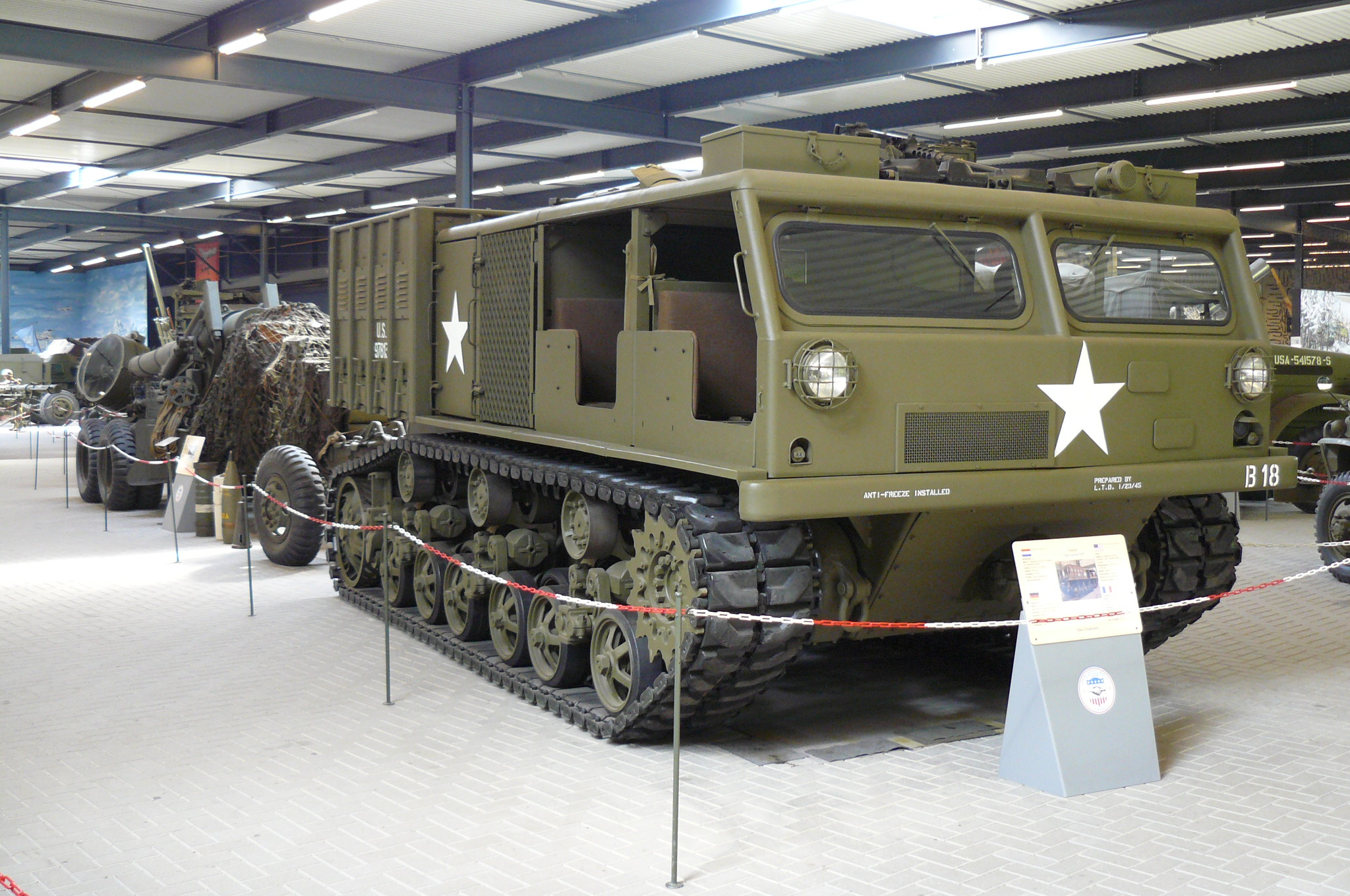
Front view, M6 Tractor, Overloon

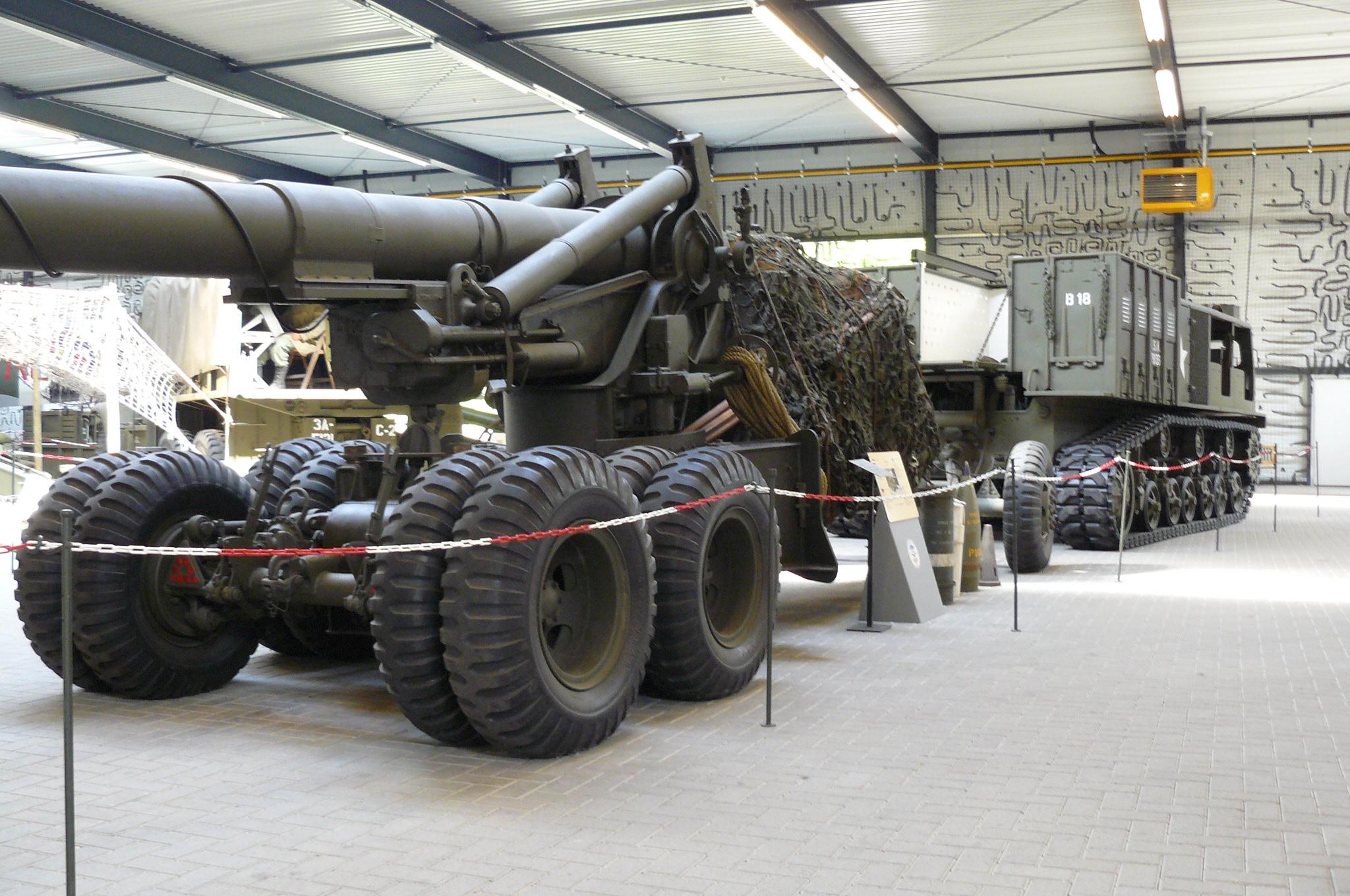
Rear view, towing an 8-inch howitzer M1, Overloon

== See also ==
- List of U.S. military vehicles by model number
- List of U.S. military vehicles by supply catalog designation (G184)

Comparable vehicles

- M4 tractor
- M5 tractor
