= 240 mm howitzer M1 =

1940s United States 240 mm field howitzer

240 mm Howitzer M1
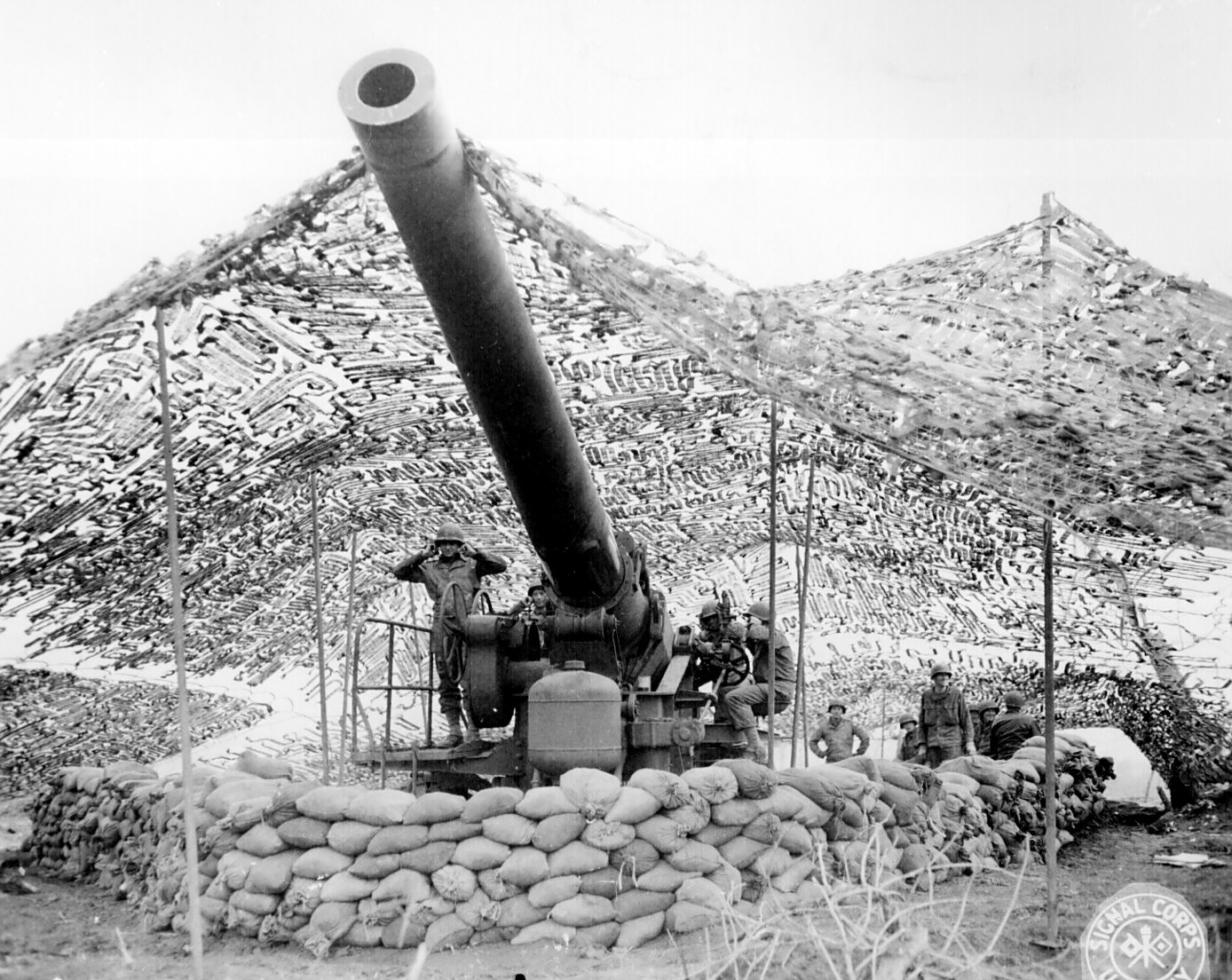
- Front view of a 240 mm howitzer firing into German held territory. Mignano area, Italy. 30 January 1944
- Type: Howitzer
- Place of origin: United States

Service history
- In service: 1943–1959 (United States); 1958 – present (Taiwan)
- Used by: United States; United Kingdom; Philippines; Taiwan
- Wars: World War II; Korean War; Second Taiwan Strait Crisis

Production history
- Designed: 1940–1943
- Produced: November 1942–1945
- No. built: 315 manufactured by 1945

Specifications
- Mass: 64,700 lb (29,300 kg) (in action)
- Barrel length: 27 ft 6 in (8.38 m) L/35
- Width: 9 ft 2 in (2.79 m)
- Crew: 14
- Shell: 360 lb (160 kg) separate loading, bagged charge
- Caliber: 240 mm (9.4 in)
- Breech: Interrupted screw
- Recoil: Hydro-pneumatic
- Carriage: Split trail with 2 transport wagons
- Elevation: +15° to +65°
- Traverse: 22.5° right and left.
- Rate of fire: 1 round per minute (maximum); 30 rounds per hour (sustained)
- Muzzle velocity: 2,300 ft/s (701 m/s)
- Maximum firing range: 14.3 mi (23.1 km)

The 240 mm howitzer M1, popularly nicknamed the "Black Dragon", was a towed howitzer used by the United States Army. The 240 mm M1 was designed to replace the World War I era 240 mm howitzer M1918, which was based on a 1911 French design and was outdated by World War II.

The project to replace the M1918 began in 1941. The 240 mm howitzer was the most powerful weapon deployed by US field artillery units during World War II, able to fire a 360 lb (160 kg) high explosive projectile 25,225 yards (23,066 m). It was the largest field piece used by the US Army during the war except for naval ordnance adapted into railway guns. The weapon addressed the requirement for super-heavy field artillery capable of attacking heavily reinforced targets, like those likely to be found along Germany's Siegfried Line.

The 240 mm howitzer M1 was designed together with the longer-ranged 8-inch gun M1, and they shared a related carriage. While use of the 8-inch gun was limited due to excessive bore wear and poor accuracy, the howitzer saw considerable action during World War II in Europe due to its effectiveness against difficult targets such as heavy concrete fortifications. It was also used in the Pacific campaign, notably in the recapture of Manila in 1945, but few targets there were fortified heavily enough to justify its use.

The US Army retained the 240 mm howitzer after World War II, and later deployed it in the Korean War. The howitzer remained in US service until ammunition stocks were exhausted in the late 1950s.

The 240 mm howitzer M1 is still in service with Taiwan, stationed in hardened bunkers of the frontline Kinmen and Matsu Islands.

== Development ==
During World War I, the United States Army received several British 9.2-inch (233.7 mm) howitzers, but was more impressed by the French Mortier de 280 modèle 1914 Schneider. 330 of the latter weapon, in a slightly modified form, were built under license by the mid-1920s as the M1918 240 mm howitzer. In 1925, it was concluded that the design was flawed, so it was decided to build a new weapon; design work, however, did not begin until 1934 and resulted in the modification of existing weapons as the M1918A1M1, but the project stalled because of limited funding. In April 1940, another design program was begun, and resulted in the 240 mm Howitzer T1. Production began in November 1942, and the piece was standardized in May 1943 as the 240 mm Howitzer M1 on Carriage M1.

== Service ==
=== Transport ===
A pair of three-axle, six-wheeled transport wagons were developed – one for the cannon tube, and one for the carriage. These transport wagons were also used with the 8-inch gun. These were standardized as the M2 and M3. The M2 wagon carried the carriage and the M3 wagon carried the barrel and recoil system. This separate configuration required the use of the 20-ton M2 truck-mounted crane for setup. The crane also included a clam-shell bucket that was transported on a trailer and used to dig the recoil pit for the gun. It took about two hours to emplace the gun.

The transport wagons were initially intended to be towed by the Mack NO 7 1/2-ton heavy truck, but it was found that the trucks had problems on soft ground due to their high ground pressure. The intended replacement was the tracked M6 tractor, which was explicitly designed for towing the 8-inch gun and 240 mm howitzer. This vehicle was standardized in June 1943, but did not enter production until February 1944, so the Ordnance Department improvised in the meantime. Surplus M3 Lee-based M31 and M32B1 tank recovery vehicles and M10A1 tank destroyers were quickly modified and tested. These proved to be satisfactory and were adopted for use as the M33, M34, and M35 Prime Movers, respectively. Likewise, the wheeled transport wagons loaded with the heavy gun components often became bogged down in soft ground, so the Ordnance Department developed the T17E1 carriage transport wagon with a pair of tracked bogies, and the T16E1 gun transport wagon with three medium tank bogies on each side. One 240 mm howitzer battalion was deployed to the Pacific in 1945 equipped with these carriages.

=== Combat use ===
The first operational use of the super-heavy 240 mm howitzer was by the 697th and 698th Field Artillery Battalions of the U.S. 5th Army at the Anzio Beachhead in Italy in January 1944. The 240 mm howitzers and the 8-inch (203 mm) guns of Batteries A and B, 575th Field Artillery Battalion (attached to the 697th and 698th, respectively), were used for counter-battery fire missions against long-range German guns in their class. Their fire was accurate enough not only to knock enemy artillery out of action, but also to destroy targets as small as German heavy tanks. US super-heavy artillery also played a role in countering the infamous Anzio Annie railway gun and putting it out of action. In Italy, the 240 mm howitzer was highly valued for its capability to destroy key bridges at long range. Army ordnance officers credited the "devastating fire power and incredible accuracy" of the 240 mm howitzer in playing a decisive role in the Italian Campaign. During the Battle of Monte Cassino, the weapon was used in the final destruction of the monastery, already damaged by air attacks. In the Italian theater, a small number of 240 mm howitzers also saw action with the British Eighth Army. Despite their initial misgivings over the deployment of such a heavy and unwieldy weapon, 5th Army commanders dubbed the 240 mm howitzer as "the most generally satisfactory weapon" in service in 1944.

By November 1944 all 8-inch guns and 240 mm howitzers had been withdrawn from Italy and sent to the Western Front. The 240 mm howitzer saw extensive service in Europe, reducing reinforced targets requiring super-heavy artillery. Fifteen 240 mm howitzer battalions served in the European Theater; the 265th, 266th, 267th, 269th, 270th, 272nd, 277th, 278th, 538th, 539th, 551st, 552nd, 553rd, 697th, and 698th. Five served in the Pacific; the 543rd, 544th, 545th, 778th, and 779th.

During the Korean War, twelve 240 mm howitzers were brought out of "mothballs" and sent to the front lines to deal with deep bunkers and fortifications built by the Chinese that could not be effectively attacked by the smaller artillery weapons then on hand. They were utilized in two units in Korea, the 213th and 159th Field Artillery Battalions. The weapons went into action on 1 May 1953. On that day, the first round was fired by Baker battery of the 213th at a target on top of a hill called "the donut" by aerial observers. The first round was supposed to be just a ceremonial shot; however, it struck an ammo dump directly on top of "the donut" which set off a chain reaction and blew part of the top of the hill off in a spectacular fashion.

In the late 1950s, several M1s were transferred to the Republic of China on Taiwan and stationed in the front-line Kinmen and Matsu Islands. The guns were put on rails to enable the howitzers to deploy outside for fire missions and to retreat inside their hardened bunkers/tunnels for protection (capable of withstanding direct hits from aerial bombs) when needed.

== Self-propelled mount ==
The 240 mm howitzer M1 was broken down into two loads for travel (the barrel and recoil mechanism and the carriage), each towed on a six-wheeled wagon by a Mack NO 7½-ton 6x6 truck or another heavy prime mover such as the M33 or M35. A truck-mounted crane was required to assemble and disassemble the weapon. Due to the problems with moving such a large, heavy weapon, a self-propelled version was made by mounting it on a stretched Heavy Tank T26E3 chassis that featured an extra bogie wheel per side, as the T92 Howitzer Motor Carriage, While 115 were planned, only five were built and the war ended before they could be used and they were later scrapped.

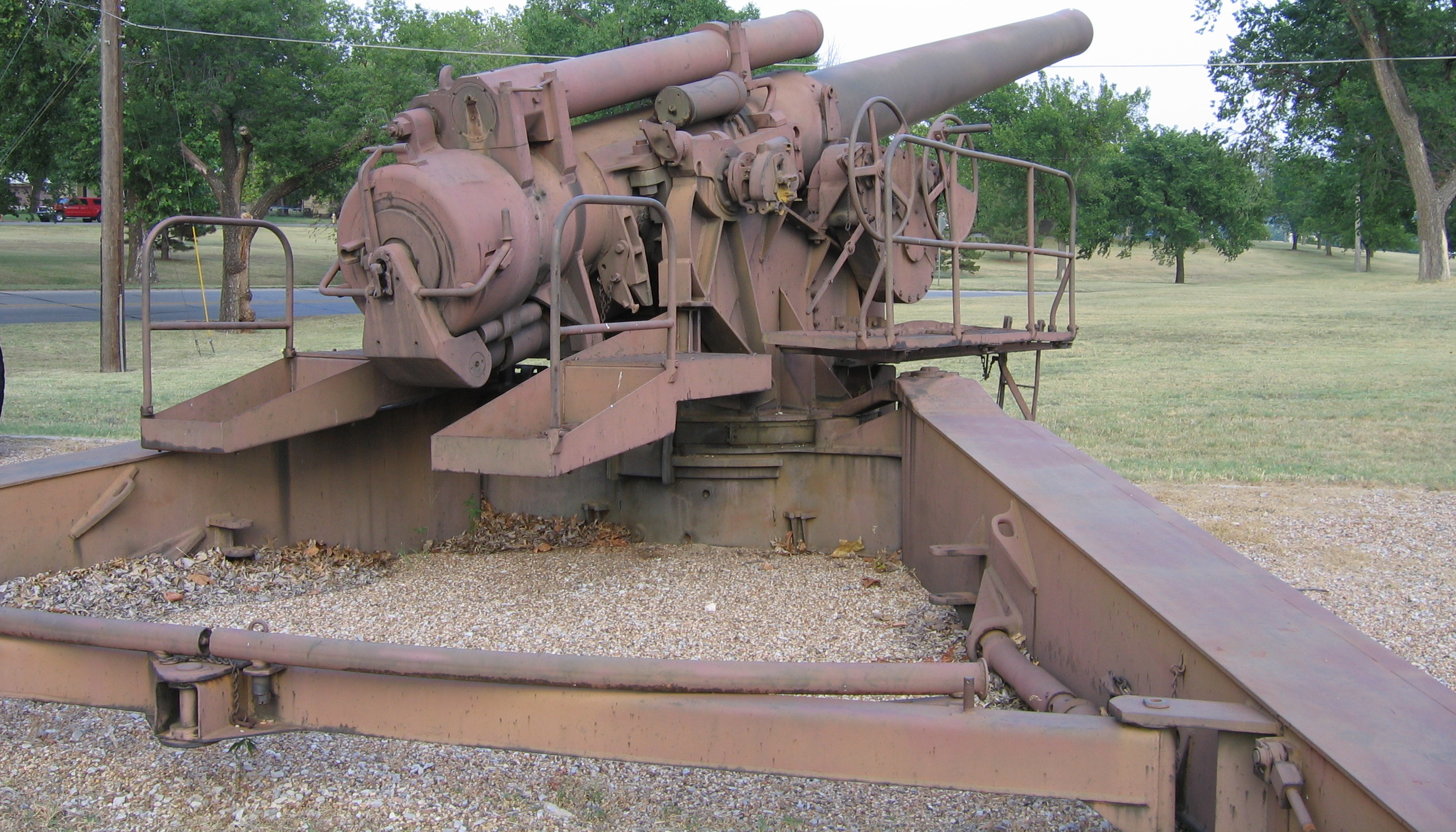
Rear view of a 240mm howitzer at the U.S. Army Field Artillery Museum, Ft. Sill, Oklahoma

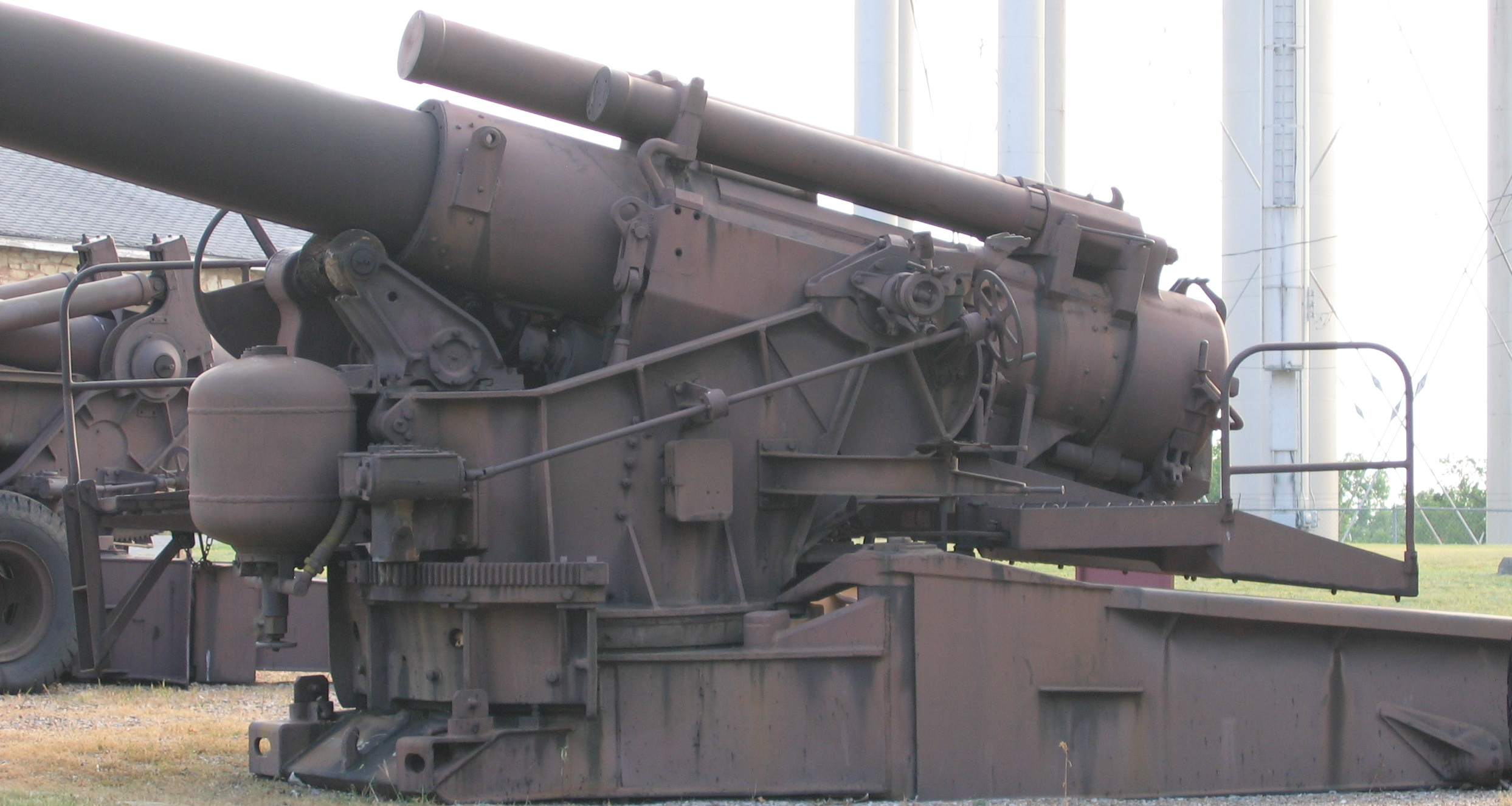
Side view of a 240mm howitzer at the U.S. Army Field Artillery Museum, Ft. Sill, Oklahoma

== See also ==
- List of U.S. Army weapons by supply catalog designation SNL D-31
