= T92 Howitzer Motor Carriage =

Self-propelled gun used in WWII

Howitzer motor carriage T92
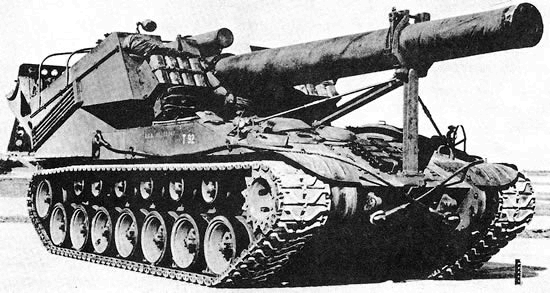
- First T92 HMC pilot vehicle
- Place of origin: United States

Specifications
- Mass: 127,000 lb (58 t)
- Length: 384 in (9.8 m; 32 ft 0 in)
- Width: 133 in (3.4 m; 11 ft 1 in)
- Height: 125 in (3.2 m; 10 ft 5 in)
- Crew: 8 (Commander, driver, co-driver, 5x gun crew)
- Rate of fire: 1 round/min
- Maximum firing range: 25,255 yd (23.093 km)
- Armor: 25 mm (0.98 in)
- Main armament: T92: 240 mm howitzer M1; T93: 8-inch Gun M1
- Engine: Ford GAF; 8 cylinder, gasoline 470 hp (350 kW)
- Power/weight: 8.1 hp/ton
- Suspension: torsion bar
- Operational range: 50–80 mi (80–129 km)
- Maximum speed: 24 km/h (15 mph)

The 240 mm howitzer motor carriage T92 was a self-propelled howitzer developed by the United States during World War II. The same mounting with the 8-inch gun M1 was developed as the gun motor carriage T93. Neither was built in significant numbers and the war ended before they could be used in combat.

== History ==
The towed 240 mm howitzer M1 was difficult to use due to its weight. Experience with the 155 mm howitzer on the M4 chassis suggested it might be possible to mount it on the Heavy Tank T26E3 (which was formally named "heavy tank M26 Pershing" in March 1945) chassis, and that the 8-inch gun could also be mounted as part of a planned "heavy combat team" using the same chassis (other members would be the T26E5 assault tank and T84 8-inch HMC). The latter was given the designation T93 gun motor carriage.

The chassis needed to be lengthened with addition of an extra road wheel, to give seven each side. The drive sprocket was also moved to the front.

A limited procurement of four pilot vehicles was ordered in March 1945, and the first was finished in July of that year; only five would be built in total. Two T93s were completed by September. All contracts were terminated with the end of the hostilities.

== Service ==
The trials of the T92 and T93 showed that they would be useful in Operation Downfall, the planned invasion of the Japanese mainland. To this end, special fuses for the shells were developed so they could be used against concrete. The T92s and T93s were being readied for sending to the Pacific War but the Japanese surrender occurred on 14 August 1945.

== Preserved vehicles ==
A surviving T92 is preserved at the Detroit Arsenal in Warren, Michigan.

== Variants ==
T93 GMC prototype, circa 1945

A similar vehicle was also built in conjunction with the T92, the T93 gun motor carriage which mounted the longer 8-inch gun M1 instead of the 240 mm howitzer.

== See also ==
- M110 howitzer
- List of Self-propelled field guns
