= 8-inch gun M1 =

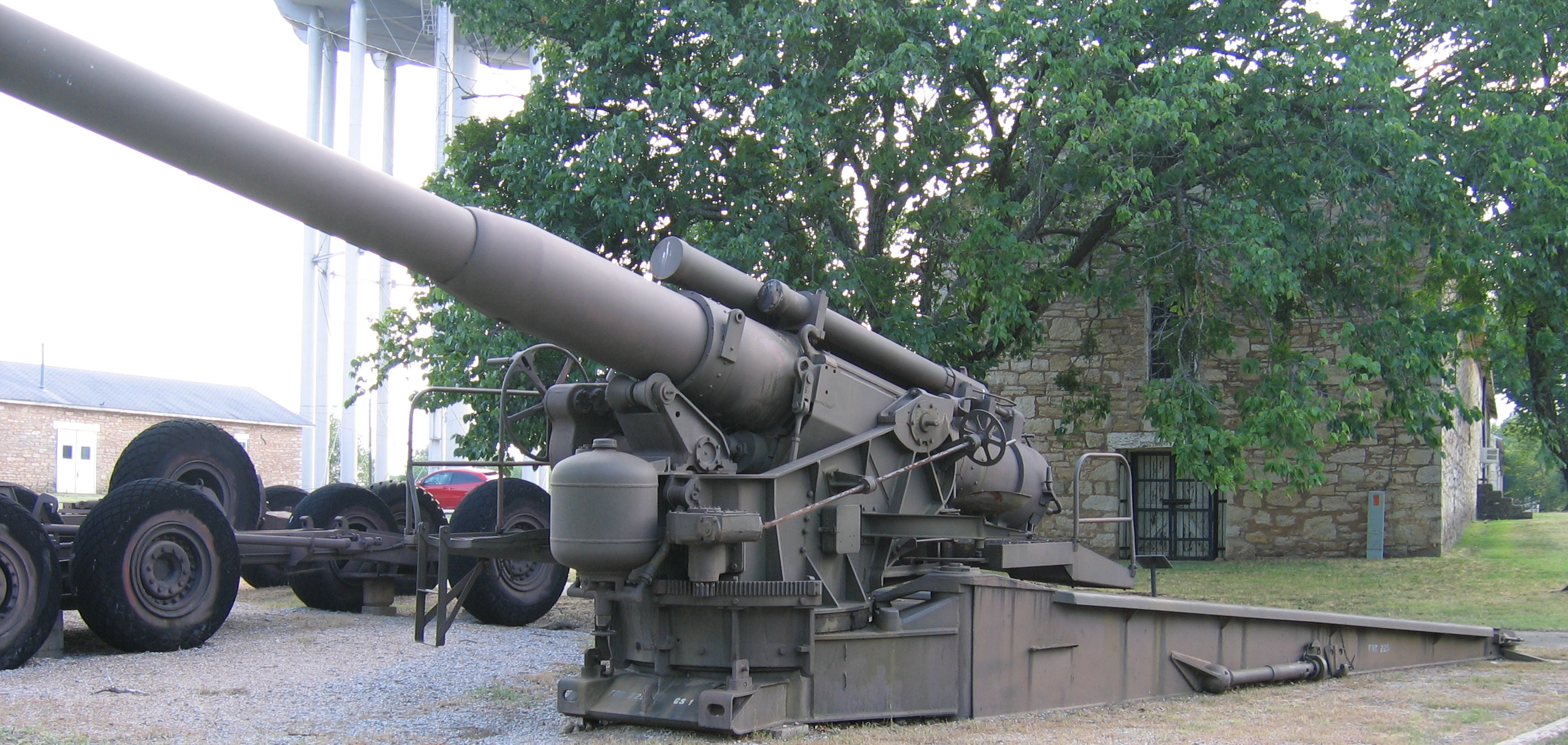
- 8-inch gun at the U.S. Army Field Artillery Museum, Fort Sill, OK
- Type: Heavy gun
- Place of origin: United States

Service history
- Used by: United States; United Kingdom
- Wars: World War II

Production history
- Designed: 1939–1942
- Produced: 1942–1945

Specifications
- Mass: Combat: 69,300 lb (31,400 kg)
- Barrel length: 33 ft 4 in (10.16 m) L/50
- Shell: separate-loading, bagged charge
- Caliber: 203 mm (8.0 in)
- Breech: Interrupted screw
- Recoil: Hydro-pneumatic
- Carriage: Split trail
- Elevation: +10° to +50°
- Traverse: 30° (initially), post-war 40°
- Muzzle velocity: 2,840 ft/s (870 m/s)
- Effective firing range: 12.5 mi (20.1 km) (minimum)
- Maximum firing range: 20.24 mi (32.57 km)

The 8-inch gun M1 was a 203 mm towed heavy gun developed in the United States. At 32,584 m (35,635 yd), it had the longest range of any US Army field artillery weapon in World War II. It was also used in small numbers by the British Army.

== Development and production ==
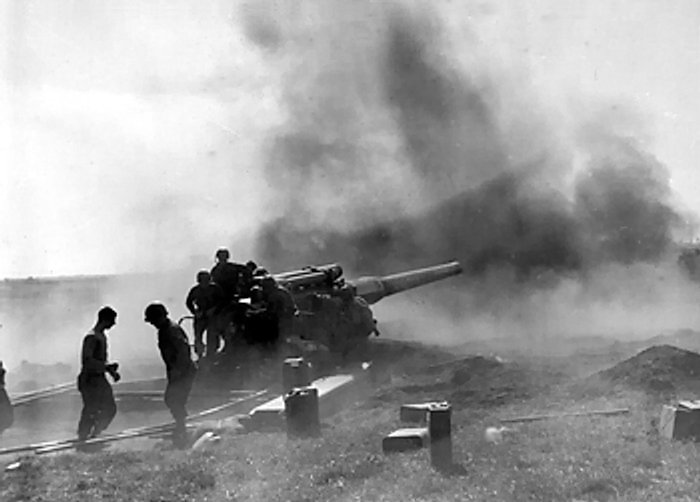
An 8-inch US Army field gun in action during the bombardment of Brest.

In 1919, the Westervelt Board, named for its president, Brigadier General William I. Westervelt, described the ideal heavy gun for future development having a bore of 194 mm to 8 inches, a projectile of about 200 lbs in weight, and a range of 35,000 yards. More striking was the requirement that it be road transportable. At this time no other country had such a road-transportable heavy field gun. Low-priority design work occurred until 1924.

Serious development restarted in June 1940, resulting in an 8-inch (203 mm) gun that would have a range of 33,500 yards (30,600 m), be transported in two loads weighing no more than 44,000 lb (20,000 kg) at a road speed of up to 25 mph (40 km/h), and also be suitable for rail movement.

The gun used the same projectile as the 8-inch coastal gun and the US Navy's 8-inch cruiser gun. Using the same carriage as the 240 mm howitzer M1 eased development, but the gun was very troublesome and was not standardized for service until January 1942.

The main problems were determined to be excessive bore wear, leading to poor accuracy, but it was felt that nothing better could be produced in a timely manner. Further, while the design suffered from significant wear and stresses imposed by the high velocity of the shell, the design was more than capable of striking targets at ranges beyond any other comparable artillery piece, potentially turning the previous German advantage in long-range counter-battery fires into a vulnerability.

The 8-inch gun M1 therefore entered production at a low rate, and in small numbers. The gun tube was produced by Watervliet Arsenal, and the recoil system was produced by Hannifin Manufacturing. Watertown Arsenal, Bucyrus-Erie, and the S. Morgan Smith Company manufactured the carriage. Only 139 weapon systems were produced before production ceased in 1945.

In the quest for greater tactical mobility, the Ordnance Department experimented with a self-propelled version. Like the 240 mm howitzer, it was mounted on a stretched Heavy Tank T26E3 chassis that had an extra bogie wheel per side as the prototype 8-inch gun motor carriage T93, but the war ended before they could be used, and were later scrapped.

== Transport ==
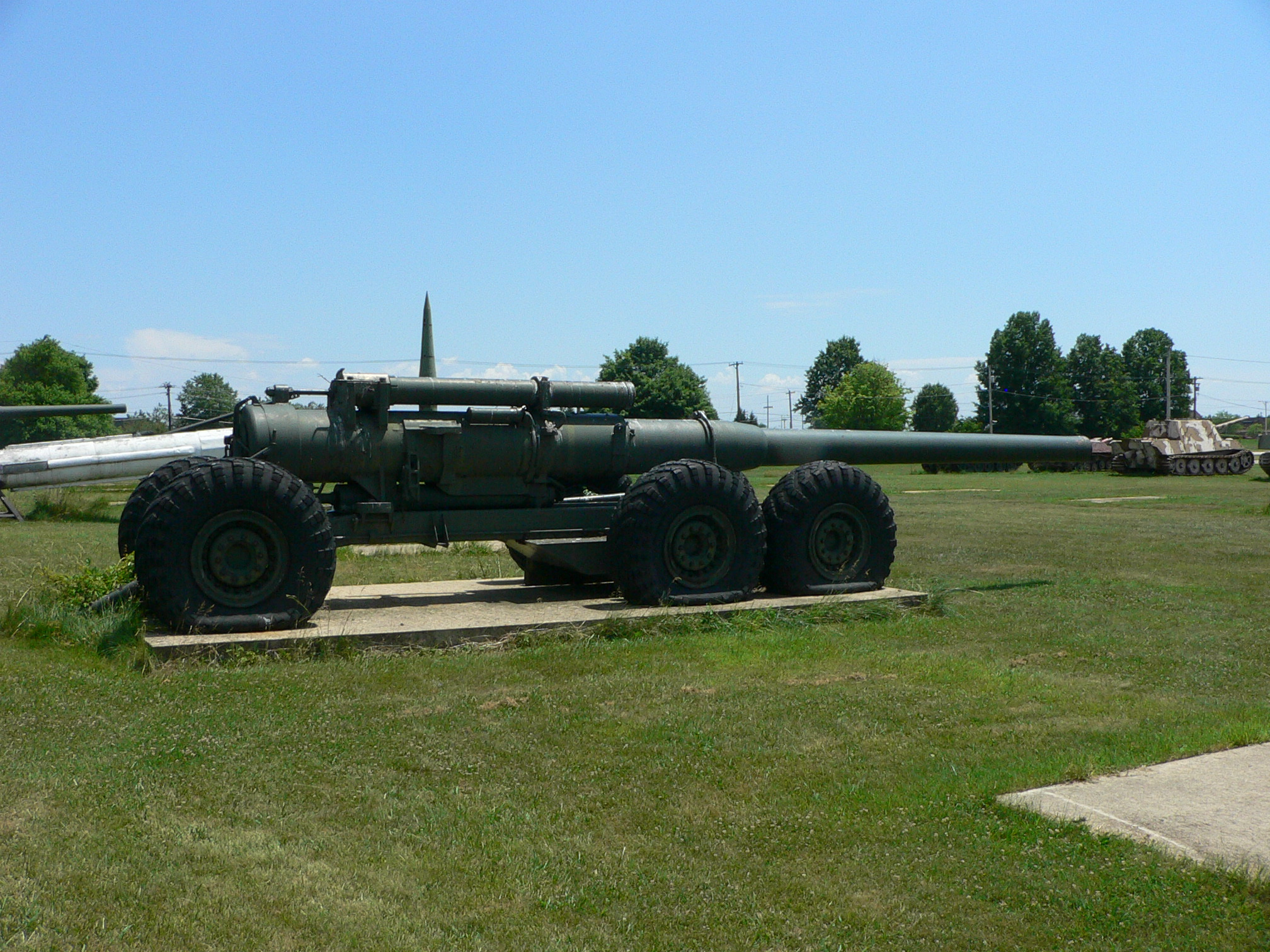
Barrel and recoil system of the M1 prepared for transportation, on display in the US Army Ordnance Museum

One of the requirements during development was that the gun be easy to emplace. Given the weight of the gun and carriage, this was a challenge. Eventually, a pair of three-axle, six-wheeled transport wagons were developed – one for the barrel and recoil mechanism, and one for the carriage. These transport wagons were also used with the 240 mm howitzer, easing logistic overhead; these were standardized as the M2 and M3 wagons.

The M2 wagon carried the gun carriage, and the M3 wagon carried the barrel and recoil system. This separate configuration required the use of the 20-ton M2 truck-mounted crane for setup. The crane also included a clam-shell bucket that was transported on a trailer and used to dig the recoil pit for the gun. In spite of the weight and being transported in two pieces, the gun could be emplaced in as little as two hours.

The transport wagons were initially intended to be towed by the Mack NO 7 1/2-ton heavy truck. Because the truck was a wheeled vehicle, it had significant mobility issues on soft ground such as mud as a result of high ground pressure. The M6 high-speed tractor, a tracked vehicle which was explicitly designed for towing the 8-inch gun and 240 mm howitzer, was standardized in June 1943 but would not enter production until February 1944. In the meantime, the Ordnance Department improvised a towing vehicle from available stocks in lieu of the upcoming Normandy Landings. Surplus M3 Lee-based M31 and M32B1 tank recovery vehicles and M10A1 tank destroyers were quickly modified and tested. These proved to be satisfactory and were adopted for use as the M33, M34, and M35 Prime Movers, respectively. The M35 Prime Mover (not to be confused with the M35 truck) was appreciated for providing superior mobility and speeds, and would be the primary transport vehicle used in Europe until the surrender of Nazi Germany to the Allies.

== Variants ==
- 8-inch gun motor carriage T93 – prototype

== Service ==
The gun was assigned to non-divisional battalions, eight of which were eventually organized, trained and equipped. Each consisted of six guns, organized into three batteries of two gun sections each. However, due to the difficulty of maintaining and finding replacement barrels, it was common to have only half the guns active at one time, being supplanted by 240mm howitzers due to their mechanical similarity and transport methods. These battalions were designated as the 153rd, 243rd, 256th, 268th, 570th, 573rd, and 780th Field Artillery Battalions in operational reports.

Five battalions saw service in Europe or Italy (the 153rd, 243rd, 256th, 268th, and 575th) and three in the Pacific (the 570th, 573rd, and 780th). First seeing action in Italy in April 1944 at the Anzio beachhead when Battery B of the 575th Field Artillery Battalion was attached to the 698th Field Artillery Battalion. Battery A of the 575th also went to the Cassino front attached to the 697th Field Artillery Battalion, and was used in the counter-battery role against long-range German 170 mm guns.

By September 1944, the 8-inch guns of the 575th had been withdrawn from Italy, and soon saw action in France where they were particularly effective against fortified targets and in counter-battery fire against German long-range artillery.

During the Battle of Saint-Malo, two batteries of the 243rd Field Artillery Battalion of 8-inch guns participated in the siege in support of the 83rd Infantry Division. The 8-inch guns scored direct hits on the walls of the ancient citadel. Notably, improvised firing positions were dug that allowed for a direct-fire engagement of the Citadel, where C Battery of the 243rd advanced to within 2,400 yards and fired 540 shells. The high velocity of the gun allowed the 243rd to effectively nullify the defenses to the south of the Citadel, as fire was directed at gun ports, openings, and other weak spots in the fortress. A fire engulfed the town of Saint-Malo during the bombardment - first assumed to be started by the German defenders - was later found to be caused by this artillery bombardment.

In the Siegfried Line campaign, in support of the American 3rd Infantry Division, the 8-inch guns adjusted by aerial observers, were successful in destroying two bridges over the Roer River. At the end of the war, the battalions were deactivated and the guns moved into storage; however, they were never again used in action and were eventually disposed of. Three surviving guns have also been deactivated and emplaced for historical purposes.

Seventeen guns were supplied to Great Britain.

== Ammunition ==
The gun was supplied with two-part ammunition with two increment charges: the M9 Green Bag propellant was used for medium ranges and was preferred for improved accuracy and reduced barrel erosion, while the M10 White Bag was used for long- and extreme-range firing. Only two fuses were used: the M51A3 point detonating (and preset delay) fuse, and the M67A3 mechanical time fuse, both of which allowed for airburst and anti-fortification use.

Propelling Charges
Model	Weight	Components
M9	34.47 kg (76 lb)	Base charge and one increment
M10	48.12 kg (106.1 lb)	Base charge and one increment

Note that both muzzle velocity and maximum range are ideal values with the M10 White Bag, of two increments of propellant, and depend heavily on the state of the barrel. As these barrels wore down, effective accuracy and range also decreased.

Projectiles
Type	Model	Weight	Filler	Muzzle Velocity (M10 Bag)	Maximum Range (M10 Bag)
HE	HE M103 Shell	108.86 kg (240 lbs)	TNT, 9.52 kg (21 lbs)	868 m/s (2,850 ft/s)	32,584 m (35,635 yd)
Drill	Dummy M13	108.86 kg (240 lbs)	N/A		

== Existing examples ==
Only three examples are known to have survived. They are located at:

- 45th Infantry Division Museum, Oklahoma City, Oklahoma
- US Army Artillery Museum, Fort Sill, Oklahoma
- US Army Ordnance Museum, Fort Gregg-Adams, Virginia

== See also ==
- List of U.S. Army weapons by supply catalog designation SNL D-33
- M6 tractor
- M115 howitzer
- M110 howitzer

== Bibliography ==
- Hogg, Ian V. (1998). Allied Artillery of World War Two. Greenhill Books. ISBN 1-85367-478-8.
- Hogg, Ian V. The Guns, 1939-45. New York: Ballantine Books, 1970 ISBN 0019067100
- Schreier Jr., Konrad F. – Standard guide to U.S. World War II Tanks & Artillery (1994) Krause Publications, ISBN 0-87341-297-4.
- Williford, Glen M (2016). American Breechloading Mobile Artillery 1875-1953. Thomas D. Batha. Schiffer Publishing Ltd. ISBN 978-0-7643-5049-8.
- Zaloga, Steven J. (2007). US Field Artillery of World War II. New Vanguard 131. illustrated by Brian Delf. Osprey Publishing. ISBN 978-1-84603-061-1.
- Technical Manual TM9-2300 Standard Artillery and fire Control Material. (dated February 1944)
- Technical Manual TM9-336 8-inch Gun M1 and Carriage M2. War Dept. Nov. 1943
- Field Manual FM6-95 Service of the Piece 8-Inch Gun M! and 240-MM Howitzer M1. War Department. Feb 1946
