= K-31 truck =

Autocar U8144 K30
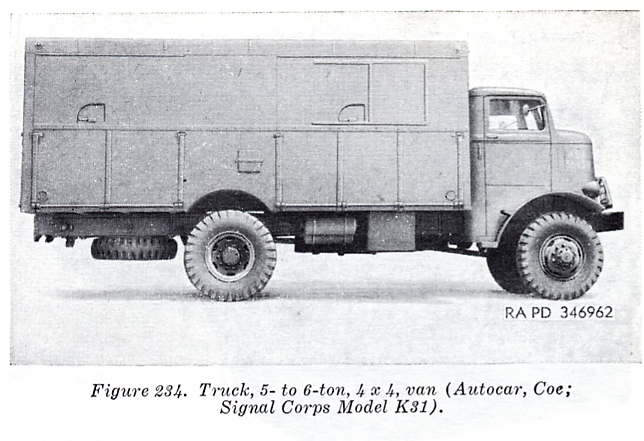
- Type: 5- to 6-ton 4x4 Van
- Place of origin: United States

Production history
- Manufacturer: Autocar Company
- Produced: 1941–1945
- No. built: 607
- Variants: K30, K62

Specifications
- Mass: 19,280 lb (8,750 kg) empty
- Length: 300 inches (7.62 m)
- Width: 98 inches (2.49 m)
- Height: 130 1/2 inches (3.31 m)
- Engine: Hercules RXC; 112 hp (84 kW)
- Transmission: 5 speed x 2 range trf. case
- Suspension: Beam axles on leaf springs
- Fuel capacity: 90 US gal (340 L)
- Operational range: 270 mi (430 km) cruising, loaded
- Maximum speed: 45 mph (72 km/h)

The K-31 truck, a US Signal Corps designation for an Autocar U8144 truck with York-Hoover van body, was used as the power truck for the SCR-270, an early warning radar of World War II. The power it delivered to the radar came from a PE-74 generator. 2) 3) 4) Similar vehicles were the K-30 and K-62 or K-62-A, all three operating trucks for the SCR-270. K-31 differed in cubic feet and overall height from K-30 and K-62. The K-62 AND K-62A were the successors of both the K-30 and K-31. Note the difference in form of the wheel arch of the van body between the depicted vehicles that shows that there must have been successive models from York-Hoover. The third image in the gallery shows that the two panels at each side were folded up when the vehicles where operated, while the panels at the back where two halves that were folded up and down respectively.

== Gallery ==
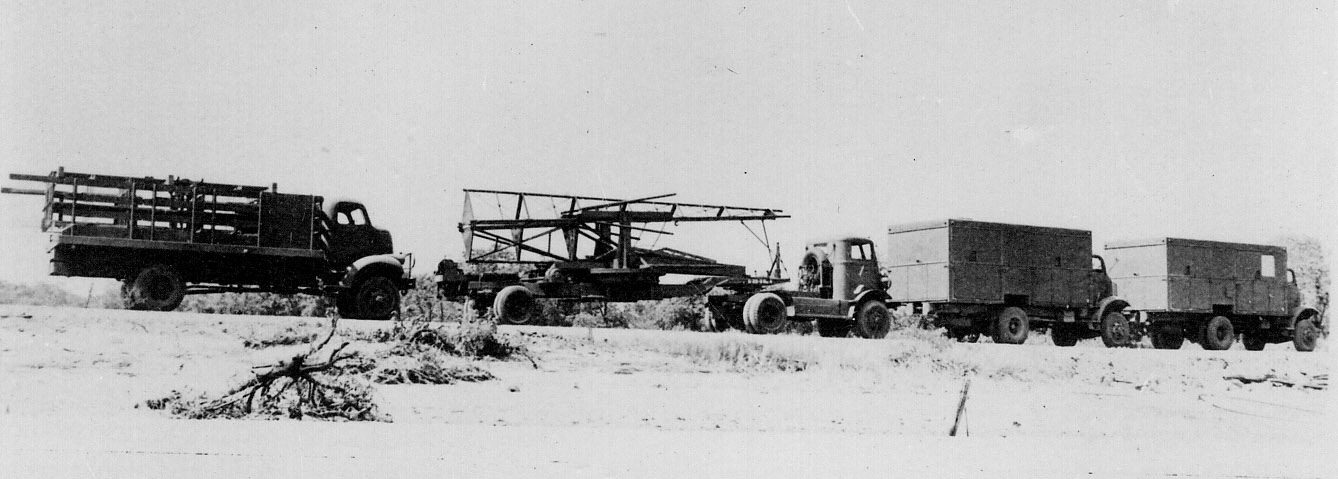
SCR-270-packed-300

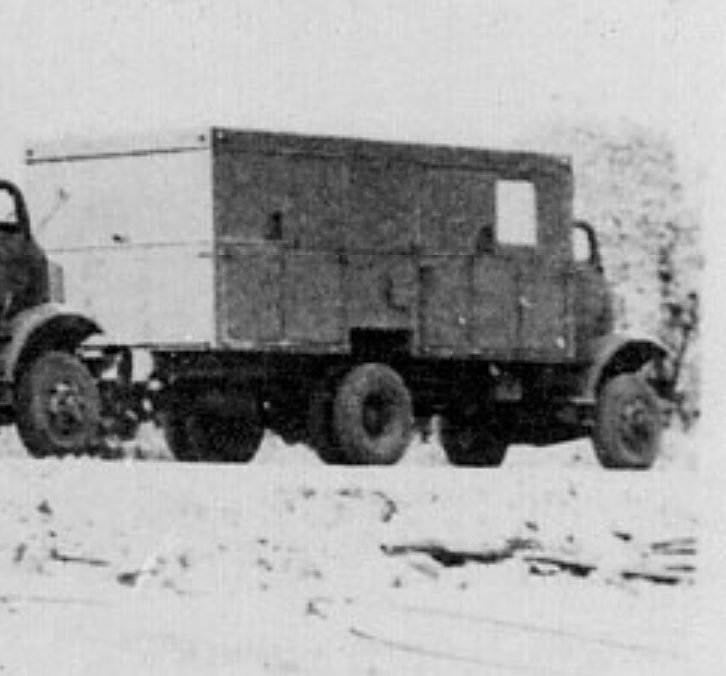
Right side K-30 Operating truck, part of SCR-270

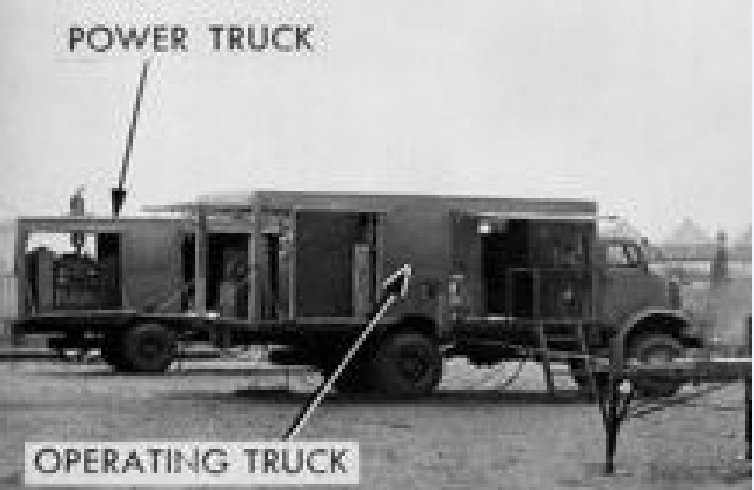
Operating truck K-30 and power truck K-31 as part of SCR-270

== See also ==
- List of US Signal Corps vehicles
- List of U.S. military vehicles by supply number
- Autocar U8144T
- Autocar
- K-30 Operating truck

== Notes ==
- 2)FM 11-25
- 3)TM 11-1410
- 4)TM 11-1540
