= K-30 truck =

Autocar U8144 K30
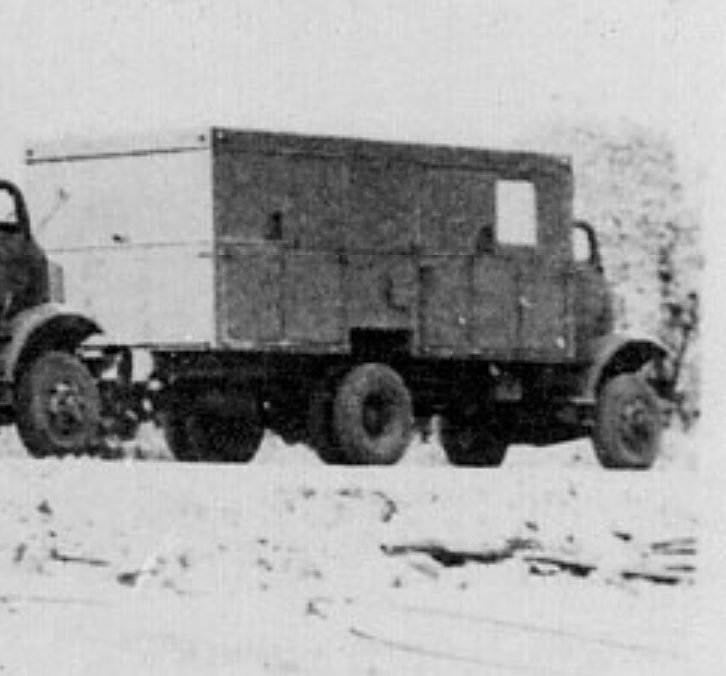
- Type: 5- to 6-ton 4x4 Van
- Place of origin: United States

Production history
- Manufacturer: Autocar Company
- Produced: 1941–1945
- No. built: 607
- Variants: K30, K62

Specifications
- Mass: 19,280 lb (8,750 kg) empty
- Length: 300 inches (7.62 m)
- Width: 98 inches (2.49 m)
- Height: 130 1/2 inches (3.31 m)
- Engine: Hercules RXC; 112 hp (84 kW)
- Transmission: 5 speed x 2 range trf. case
- Suspension: Beam axles on leaf springs
- Fuel capacity: 90 US gal (340 L)
- Operational range: 270 mi (430 km) cruising, loaded
- Maximum speed: 45 mph (72 km/h)

The K-30 truck, a US Signal Corps designation for an Autocar U8144 truck with York-Hoover van body, was used as the Operating Truck for the SCR-270, an early-warning radar of World War II. 2) 3) 4) Similar vehicles were the K-31 power truck for the SCR-270 early warning radar and K-62 or K-62-A, both operating trucks also for the SCR-270. K-30 and the similar K-62(-A) differed in cubic feet and overall height from the K-31. On the accompanying image in the infobox can be seen, that the K-30 beside in cubic feet and overall height differed from the K-31 in having a window on the right side of the van body. The panels at the back and at both sides were formed by two halves, that were folded up and down respectively. This truck contains a high-power radio transmitter, a cooling system for the transmitter tubes, two cathode-ray oscilloscopes (one carried as a spare), two superheterodyne receivers (one spare), a vacuum-tube keyer, a plotting table, and containers for spare parts and tubes.

== Gallery ==
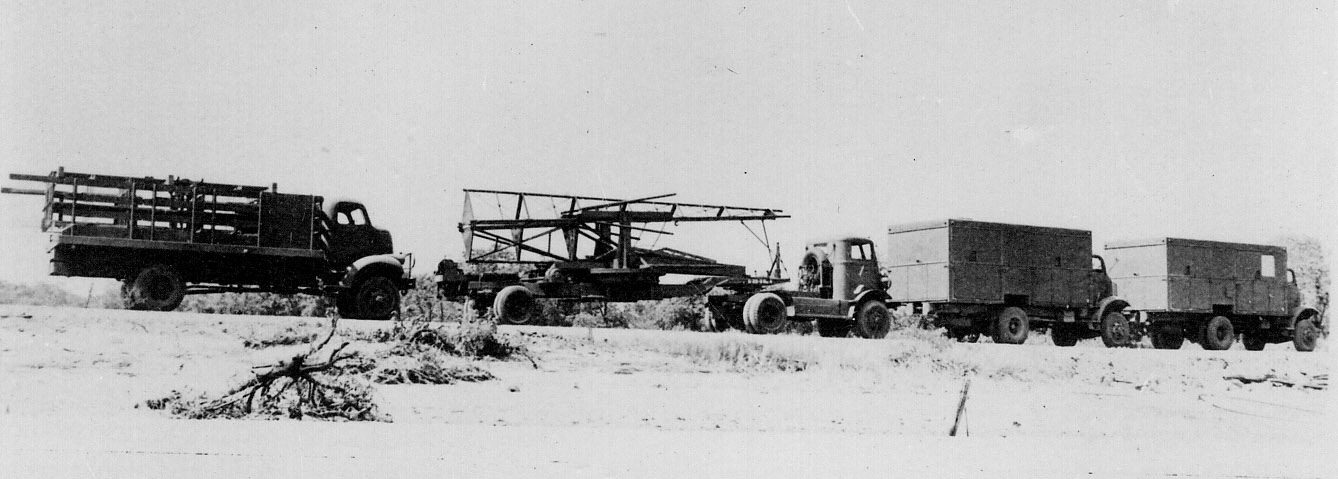
SCR-270-packed-300

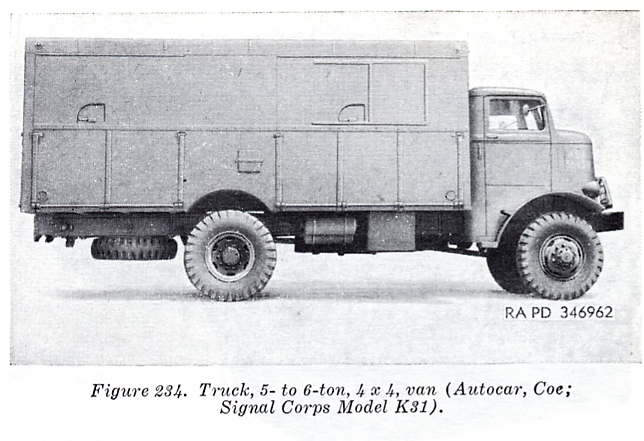
K-30 Operating truck for the SCR-270

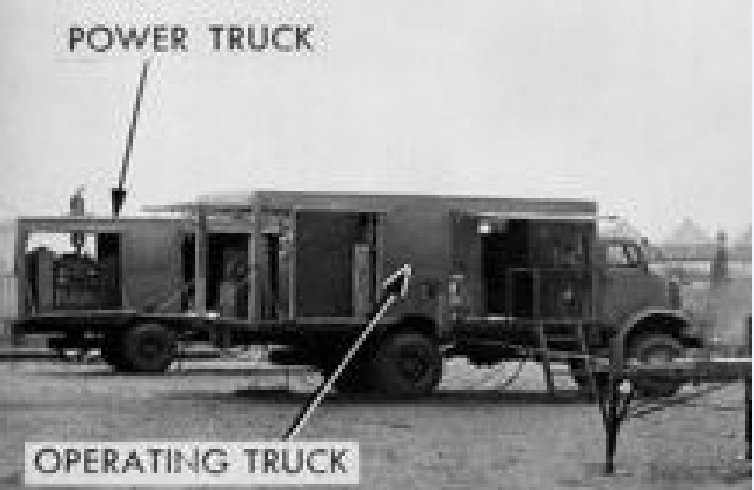
Operating truck K-30 and power truck K-31 as part of SCR-270

== See also ==
- List of US Signal Corps vehicles
- List of U.S. military vehicles by supply number
- Autocar U8144T
- K-31 power truck
- SCR-270 Radar

== Notes ==
- 2)FM 11–25
- 3)TM 11–1410
- 4)TM 11–1540
- 5)FM-25 1942 pg.24,25
