= Autocar U8144T 5- to 6-ton 4×4 truck =

US heavy four-wheel drive truck

Autocar Model U8144T
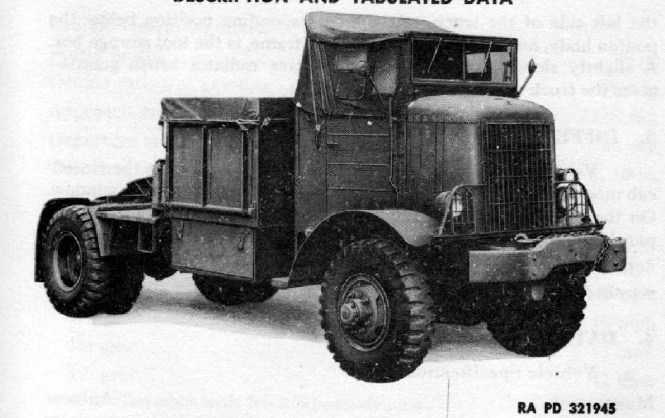
- Autocar U8144T Ponton Tractor
- Type: 5–6 ton 4×4 semi-tractor
- Place of origin: United States

Production history
- Manufacturer: Autocar
- Produced: 1941–1945
- No. built: U8144-T: 2,711 units
- Variants: U8144 Van: 607 units (1942–44); 5-ton truck, 4×4; U5044-T: 97 units (1940–41); 4- to 5-ton truck, 4×4 U7144-T: 11,104 units (1941–1945); White 444T: 2,751 units ('44–'45); 2 1/2-ton truck, 4×4; U2044/U4044: 233 units (1940–41); U4144: 138 trucks (1941) U4044-T: 548 tractors (1940–41); U4144-T: 274 tractors (1941)

Specifications (with open cab)
- Mass: 16,100 lb (7,300 kg) (empty)
- Length: 20 ft 6 in (6.25 m)
- Width: 8 ft 1 in (2.46 m)
- Height: 9 ft 7 in (2.92 m) reducible to 7 ft 6 in (2.29 m)
- Engine: Hercules RXC; 131 hp (98 kW)
- Transmission: 5 speed × 2 range trf. case
- Suspension: Live beam axles on leaf springs
- Fuel capacity: 90 US gallons (340 L)
- Operational range: 234 mi (376.6 km) w/load
- Maximum speed: 42 mph (68 km/h)

The Autocar Model U8144T, officially "5- to 6-Ton, 4×4, Ponton Tractor Truck", (supply catalog number G511) was the largest, and most heavy-duty, of a family of heavy four-wheel drive trucks developed for, and deployed primarily with, the United States Army in World War II. They were of a "cab over engine" design, and produced by the Autocar Company from 1941 to 1945 with 2,711 being built.

The U8144 had a similar chassis, with van bodies by York-Hoover—607 were built for use of the SCR-270 early warning radar system by the U.S. Signal Corps.

As part of the same family, over 11,000 of the U7144-T, and some 2,750 of the virtually identical White 444T were built to serve as rear area tractor trucks to haul semi-trailers, ranging from flatbed to communications vans.

== History ==
In the late 1930s, as the war approached, the Autocar Company, that had been selling trucks to the U.S. Army since 1909, began adapting their commercial cab over engine (C.O.E.) trucks for military duty. In 1939 Autocar began developing their two-wheel drive, 5-ton (4,536 kg; on road cargo rating) Model U70 truck, into a four wheel drive range—the 2 1/2-ton (2,268 kg; off-road load rating) U2044, U4044 and U4144 trucks and U4044-T and U4144-T tractors; the 5-ton (4,536 kg) model U5044-T and the 4- to 5-ton, model U7144-T, 4×4, tractor trucks—and the largest: the U8144 and U8144-T trucks and tractors.

In the nomenclature, "U" indicated "engine Under the seats" (for C.O.E.); the first two numerals were the core model number, the next two numerals indicated the wheels and drive (44 for 4×4), and "T" indicated "tractor".

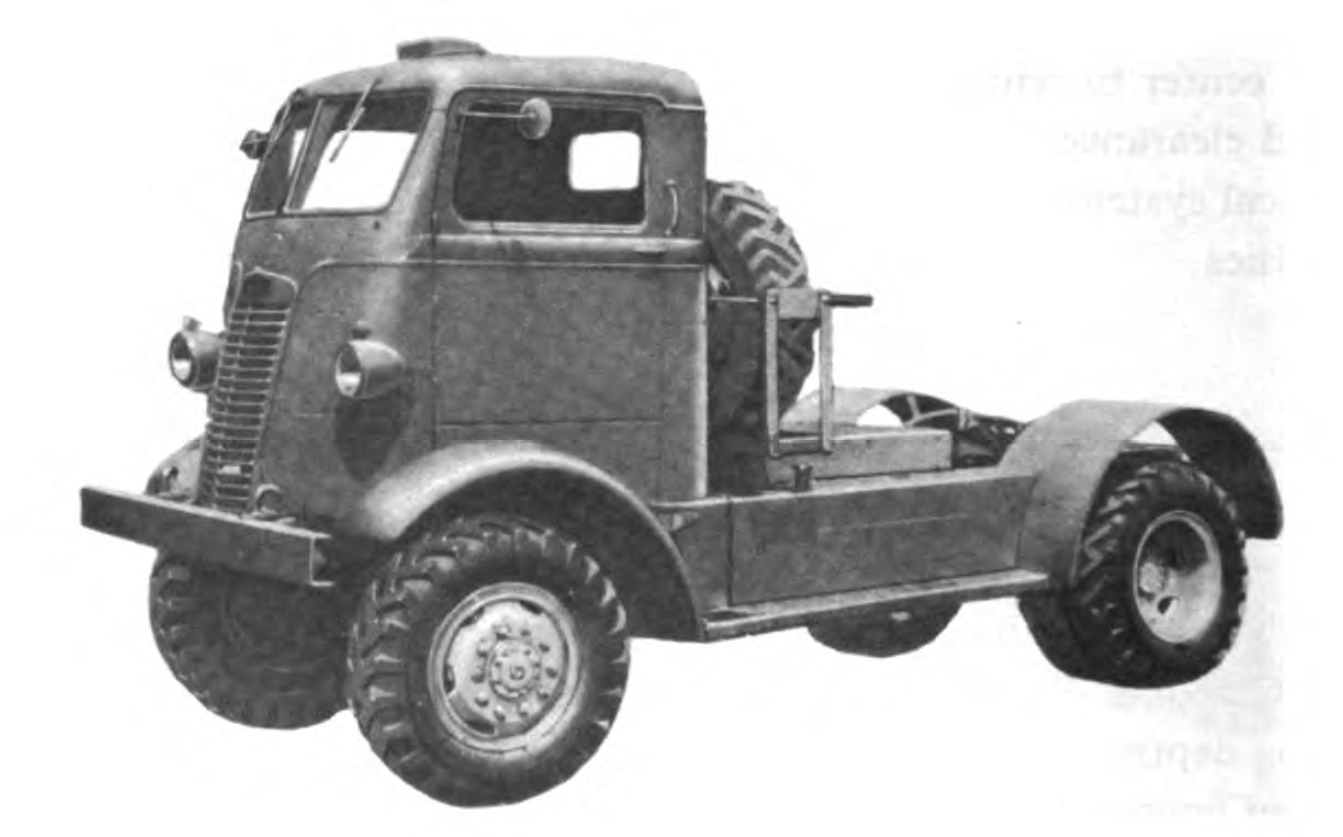
Autocar 4044-T/4144-T 2½-ton tractor truck (1940/1941)

The first in the range was the 2.5-ton model U2044 truck, with a 320 cu in (5.2 L) Hercules JXD engine with an output of 84HP—but once equipped with Autocar's own 377 cu in (6.2 L), 100HP, six-cylinder gasoline engine, the trucks evolved into the U4000 range. Autocar built 233 models U2044 and U4044 trucks, and 548 model U4044-T tractors in 1940–1941; and 138 model U4144 trucks and 274 model U4144-T tractors in 1941. The model U2044, U4044 and U4144 trucks were all built by Autocar as cab and chassis, with third-party bodies, as 2 1/2-ton, L-1, 660 gallons, Oil Servicing tankers – 371 units in all. A further 822 units were built as towing tractors – 548 models U4044-T and 274 models U4144-T. All U2044 and U4044/U4144 models (1,193 units) were mechanically largely similar and grouped together as the SNL G-626.

The U5044-T (a.k.a. G-635) was also powered by Autocar's 377 cu in (6.2 L), 100HP engine, but had twice the load rating as the U4144-T. Only 97 were produced in 1940 and 1941 – primarily as a line haul tractor to tow fuel trucks. In 1941, the U8144T became the Army's standard ponton tractor—a specialized tractor for towing ponton trailers, loaded with bridge sections—and went into production.

== Engine and driveline ==
For the U8144 models, a Hercules RXC engine was used. This 529 cu in (8.7 L) L-head inline 6 cylinder gasoline engine developed 131 hp (98 kW) at 2300 rpm and 368 lbf⋅ft (499 N⋅m) of torque at 900 rpm.

The 5-speed manual transmission was direct in 4th gear and had an overdrive gear. A 2-speed transfer case also engaged or disengaged the front axle.

The ladder frame had a 21 feet 11 inches (6.68 m) wheelbase with two banjo style live beam axles on leaf springs. Brakes were full air, the tires were 12.00x20.

== Bodies ==
The U8144T tractor was used to tow semi-trailers with 10-ton or 25-ton ponton bridging equipment. Directly behind the cab was a large toolbox. 2,711 were built between 1941 and 1945, of which 42 went to the Soviet Union under the Lend Lease Act.

The U8144 had a similar chassis with van bodies built by York-Hoover. They were used by the Signal Corps for the SCR-270 early warning radar. The K-30 was the operating truck and the K-31 was the power generator truck. The K-30 had a window on the left and right front side of the van body and the K-31 did not. There was also a K-62(-A) operating truck; 607 of all types were built.

== U7144-T Tractor, 4- to 5-ton, 4×4 / White 444T ==
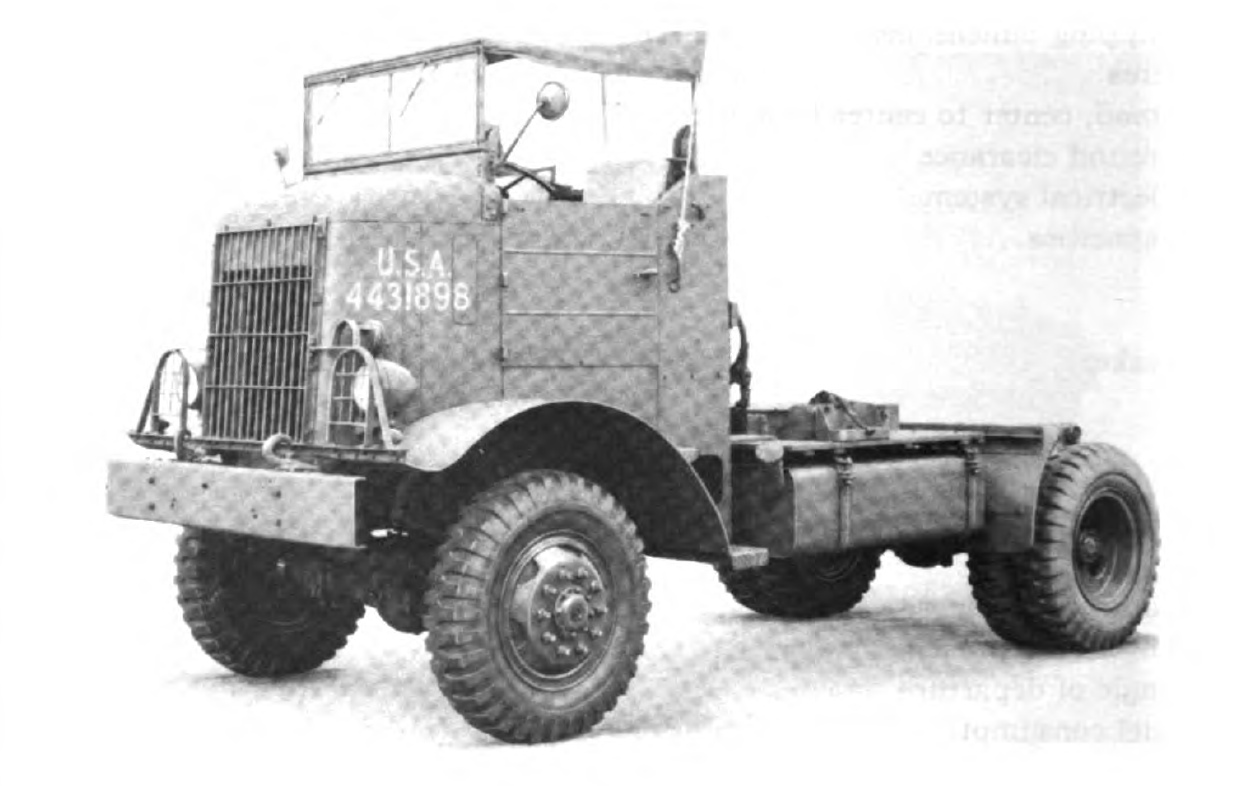
Autocar U7144-T tractor truck

The Autocar U7144-T or (G-510) was a shorter version of the U8144-T tractor truck, with the same driveline, but with a shorter wheelbase and without the toolbox behind the cab. Nor did it have the U8144's oversize tires – using 9.00×20s instead, and it was rated at 4-tons off-road.

The model was also built by White Motor Company, who bought Autocar in 1953, as their Model 444T (G-691), and there was the mechanically equivalent Federal G-513. Together, these were the U.S. Army's standard 4- to 5-ton, 4×4 tractor trucks, used for towing a variety of semi-trailers, like the 25-foot and 40-foot, 12 1/2-ton type C-2 flatbeds (for wrecking, moving aircraft, and general hauling), and the AAF type F-2 and F-2A fuel tankers. The U7144-T also towed a trailer with SCR-270 antenna support components.

The U7144-T and White 444T had a maximum towed load capacity of 30,000 lbs, and both were powered by the same Hercules RXC 529 cu.in., 112HP, six-cylinder gasoline engine. Autocar built 11,104 of these from 1941 through August 1945, and White built another 2,751 units from mid 1944 to 1945.

For all intents and purposes, the White 444T was an exact double of the Autocar U7144-T, in every aspect, and the U.S. Army published not a single technical manual (TM) specific to the White truck. Nor did any of the Autocar's manuals mention the existence of White-built units. Nevertheless, White assigned its own parts numbers for their trucks, so the only official "manual" publication for the White was the SNL G-691 supply parts catalog.

Additionally, the Federal 94×43 Tractor, 4- to 5-ton, 4×4 (G-513), was functionally completely equivalent. Although Federal used entirely its own coachwork for the cab, their truck used the same Hercules engine, and many of the same major chassis components as the Autocar and the White; the TM 9-2800 manual for 'Standard military motor vehicles' of 1943 even listed the Autocar (G510) and the Federal (G-513) as two versions under one heading.

From 1941 to 1945, Federal built 8,119 units of their 4- to 5-ton, 4×4, tractor trucks—bringing the total procurement of such trucks, according to the U.S. Ordnance Division to 21,974 units.

== Gallery ==
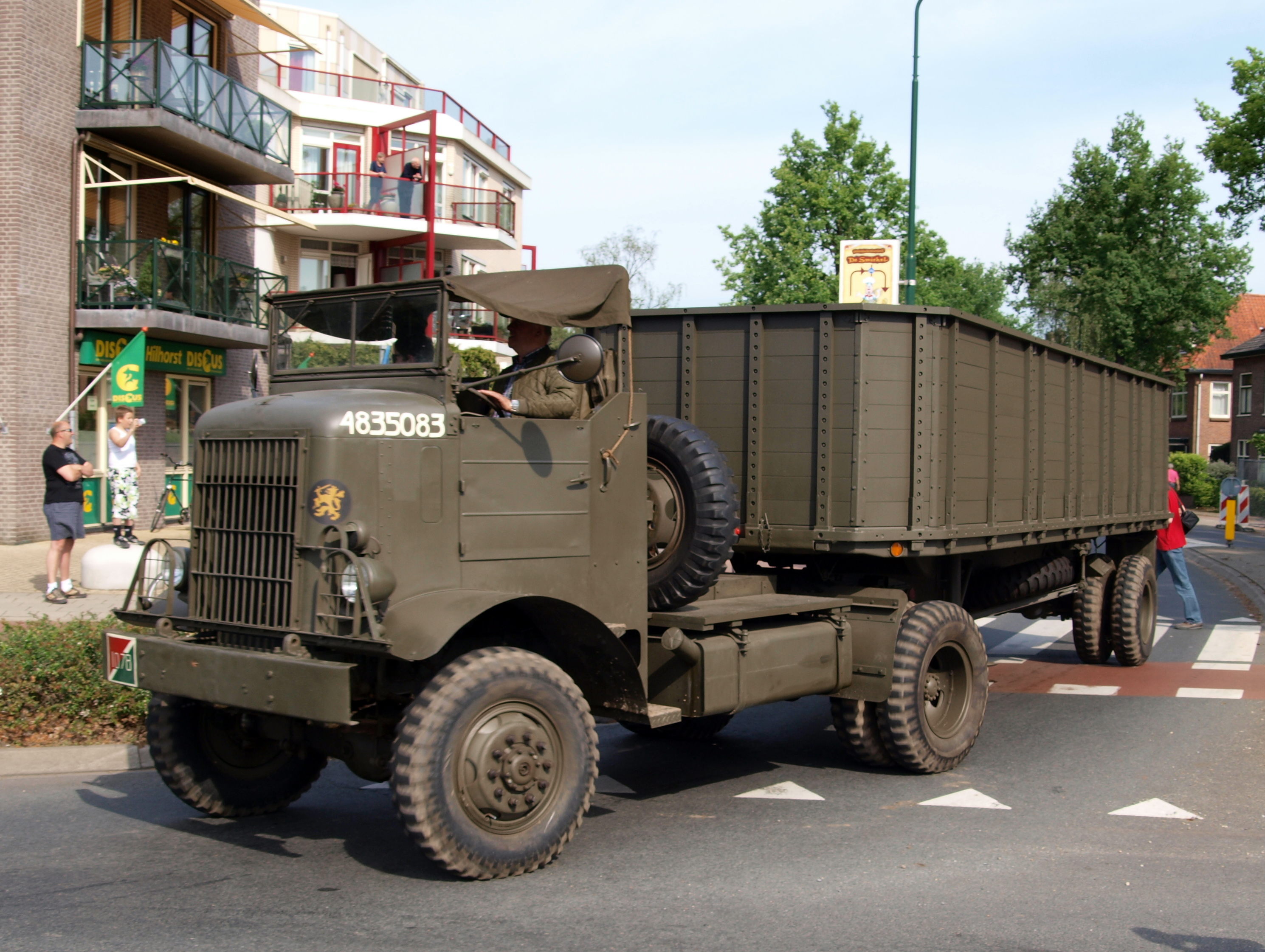
U7144T tractor with trailer

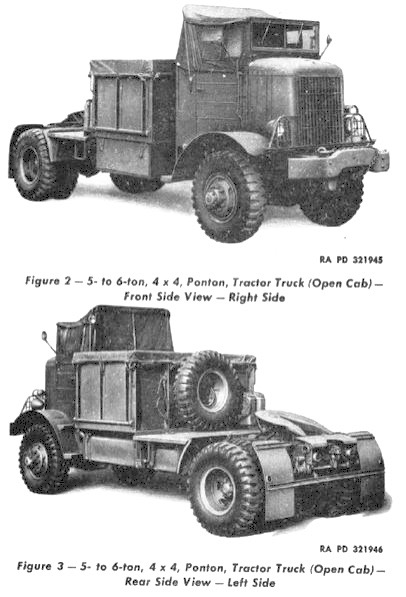
U8144T with open cab

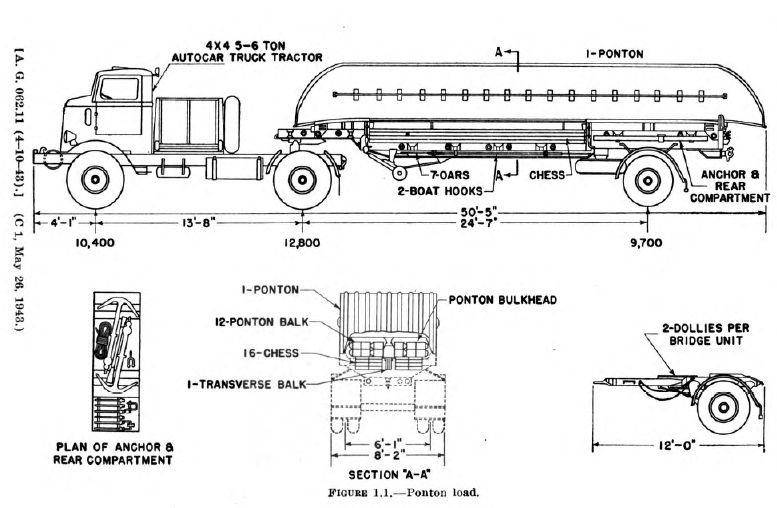
Drawing of U8144T
with trailer and load

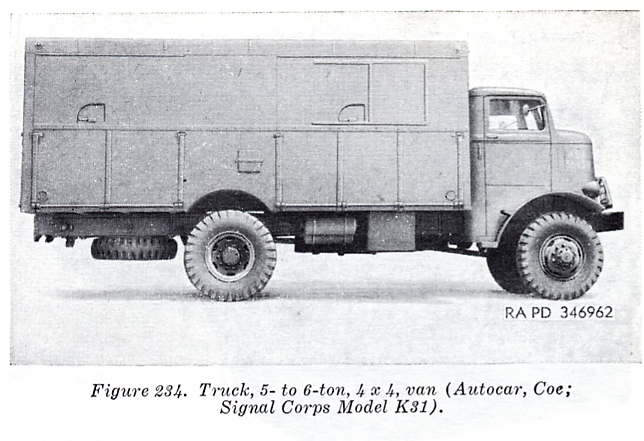
U8144
K-31 power truck

== See also ==
- Autocar Trucks
- K-30 Operating truck
- K-31 truck
- List of US Signal Corps vehicles
- List of U.S. military vehicles by supply number

== References, general ==
- Chief of Ordnance Office; Military Vehicle Preservation Association, eds. (2010). Summary Report of Acceptances, Tank-Automotive Materiel, 1940–1945 (Revision). Detroit: U.S. Army Service Forces, Office: Chief of Ordnance-Detroit, Production Division, Requirements and Progress Branch (published December 1945).
- Doyle, David (2003). Standard Catalog of U.S. Military Vehicles. Krause Publications. ISBN 0-87349-508-X. Archived from the original on 27 March 2018.
- Doyle, David (2011). Standard Catalog of U.S. Military Vehicles (2nd ed.). Krause Publications. ISBN 978-1-4402-2572-7. Archived from the original on 26 March 2018.
- Ordnance Publications For Supply Index (OPSI) (pdf). Washington: War Department, Ordnance Office. 1 July 1943. pp. 68–129. "Introduction to The Ordnance Catalog, Index of Standard Nomenclature Lists, Ordnance Provision System Regulations, Schedules of Stores Reports, Ordnance Storage and Shipment Charts, and Alphabetical Listing of Major Items"
- TM 9-816: 4- to 5-Ton 4 x 4 Tractor Truck (Autocar U-7144T) (PDF). US War Dept. 1944. Archived (PDF) from the original on 25 March 2018.
- TM 9-817 5- to 6-Ton 4 x 4 Ponton Tractor Truck (Autocar Model U8144T) (PDF). US War Dept. 1944.
- TM 9-1817 Power Train, Chassis, and Body for 5- to 6-Ton Ponton Tractor Truck (Autocar Model U8144T) (PDF). US War Dept. 1944.
- TM 9-2800 Standard Military Motor Vehicles. US War Dept. 1943. pp. 326-327.

G-511: Autocar U8144(-T)

- ORD 7 SNL G-511, 1949
- ORD 7 SNL G-511, 1952
- ORD 8 SNL G-511, 1952
- ORD 9 SNL G-511 Ordnance Supply Catalog (PDF). US Army Service Force. 1945.
- TM 10-1497, Truck, 5-6ton, 4x4, Autocar U-8144, U-8144T. Maintenance, 1 July 1942
