= Autocar Company =

American truck manufacturer

Autocar Company Inc.
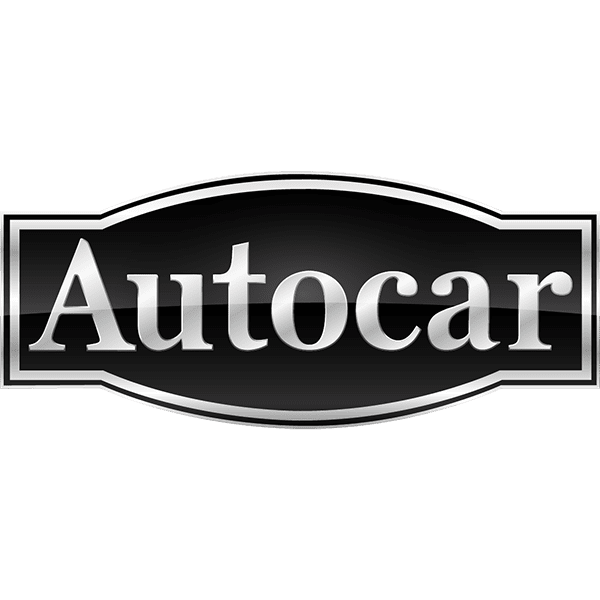
- Type: Private subsidiary of GVW Group, LLC
- Industry: Commercial vehicles
- Founded: Pittsburgh, Pennsylvania, U.S. (October 21, 1897; 129 years ago)
- Headquarters: Birmingham, Alabama, United States
- Key people: Andrew Taitz (chairman); James (Jimmy) Jonhson (president)
- Products: Severe Duty Class 7 & 8 truck chassis and Terminal Tractors
- Website: autocartruck.com

The Autocar Company is an American specialist manufacturer of severe-duty, Class 7 and Class 8 vocational trucks, with its headquarters in Birmingham, Alabama. Started in Pittsburgh, Pennsylvania, in October 1897 as a manufacturer of early Brass Era automobiles, and trucks from 1899, Autocar is the oldest surviving motor vehicle brand in the Western Hemisphere.

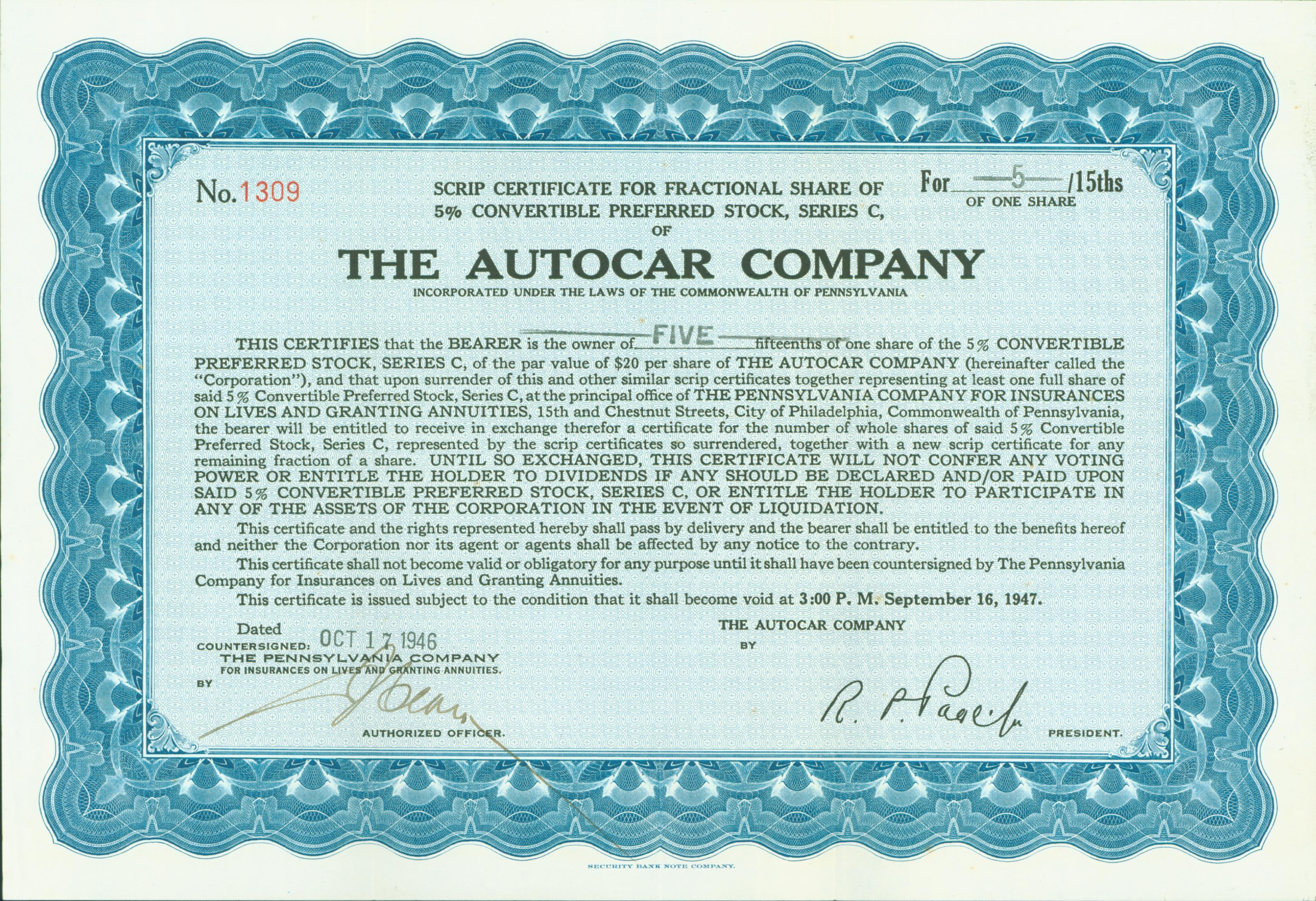
Scrip certificate of The Autocar Company, issued 17 October 1946

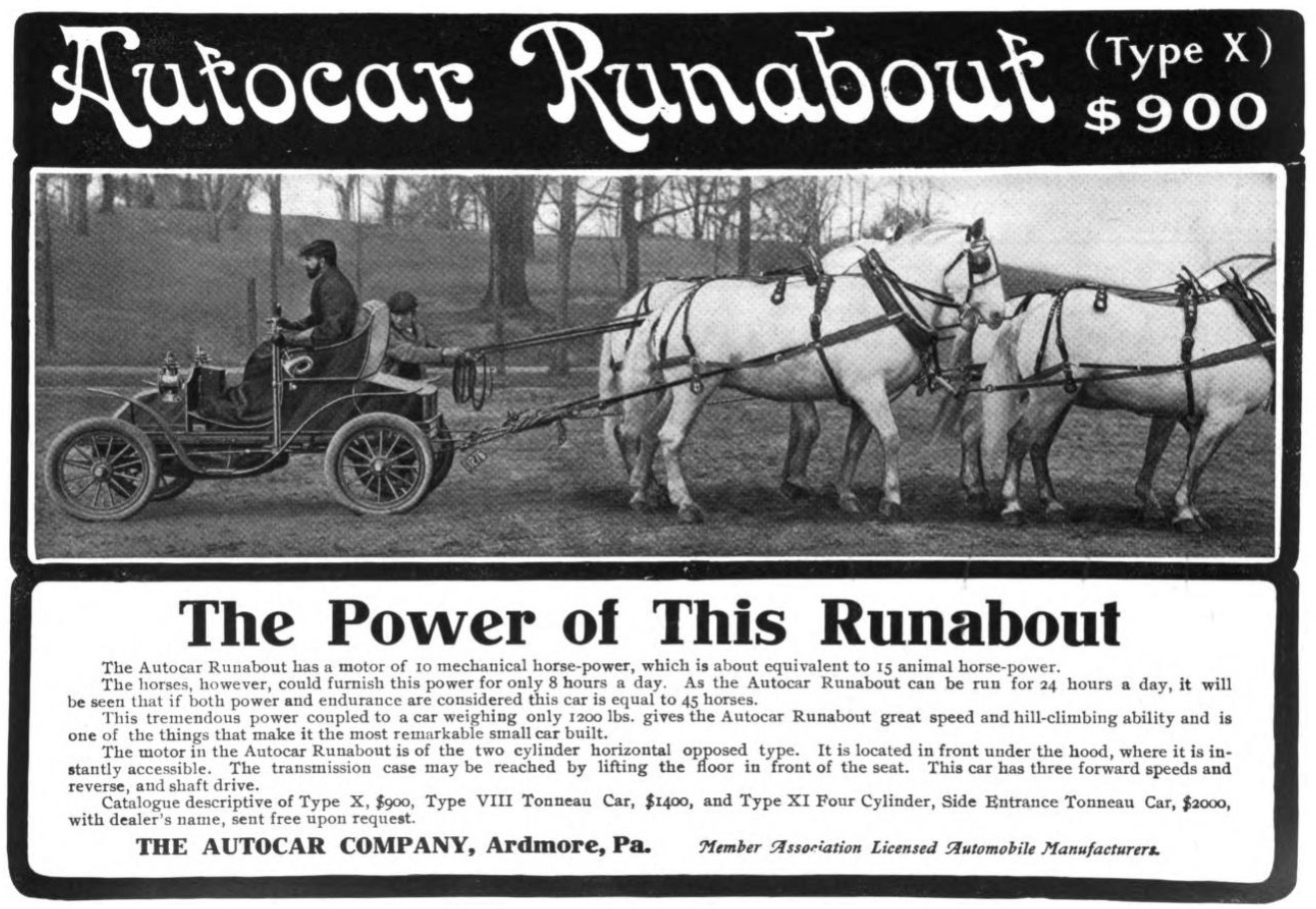
Autocar Type X advertisement (1905)

Their last cars of their own manufacture were produced in 1911; after that the company continued as a maker of severe-duty trucks. The Autocar Company was taken over 42 years later, in 1953, by White Motor Corporation (established 1900), which made Autocar their top-of-the-line brand for continuing producing heavy-duty industrial trucks. White Motors was in turn taken over 28 years later by Volvo Trucks of Sweden in 1981, with Autocar continuing as a separate division. In 2001, Autocar was acquired by GVW Group, LLC, which revived Autocar as an independent company. Autocar now builds four models of custom-engineered heavy-duty trucks and has regained leading positions in several vocational segments.

== History ==
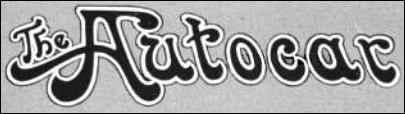
Autocar logo 1912

The company was originally called the Pittsburgh Motor Vehicle Company when started in Pittsburgh, Pennsylvania, in October 1897 but was renamed two years later in 1899 as The Autocar Company when it moved east across the "Keystone State" to Ardmore, Pennsylvania, outside Philadelphia. One of the company's early cars was named the "Pittsburgher". By 1907, the company had decided to concentrate on commercial vehicles and soon withdrew from the passenger automobile manufacturing and production business. The Autocar brand is still in use a century and a quarter later for commercial trucks.

Based on the minutes of Autocar company board of directors meetings during 1903–1907, it is known that in 1903 the board of directors included the president, Louis S. Clarke, the secretary, John S. Clarke, and James K. Clarke. Both Louis Semple Clarke and his brother John S. Clarke were members of the South Fork Fishing and Hunting Club connected with the causes of the disaster of the Great Johnstown Flood of May 1889.

=== Founder ===
Autocar founder Louis Semple Clarke (1867–1957) was a successful mechanical engineer. Among Clarke's innovations were the porcelain-insulated spark plug for gasoline engines, a perfected drive shaft system for automobiles, and the first design of a useful oil circulation system. Other impacts include Clarke's initiative to place the driver on the left hand side of the vehicle which eventually became the standard in much of the automotive industry worldwide, as well as the Autocar thread specification, which became the standard in the U.S. automotive industry.

Clarke was also a talented photographer. His family were members of the exclusive South Fork Fishing and Hunting Club above Johnstown, Pennsylvania, whose earthen dam at Lake Conemaugh burst on May 31, 1889, causing the Johnstown Flood.

Clarke sold his interest in Autocar in 1929 and retired from business. He died in Palm Beach, Florida, on January 6, 1957, and is buried in Allegheny Cemetery, in Pittsburgh.

=== Products ===
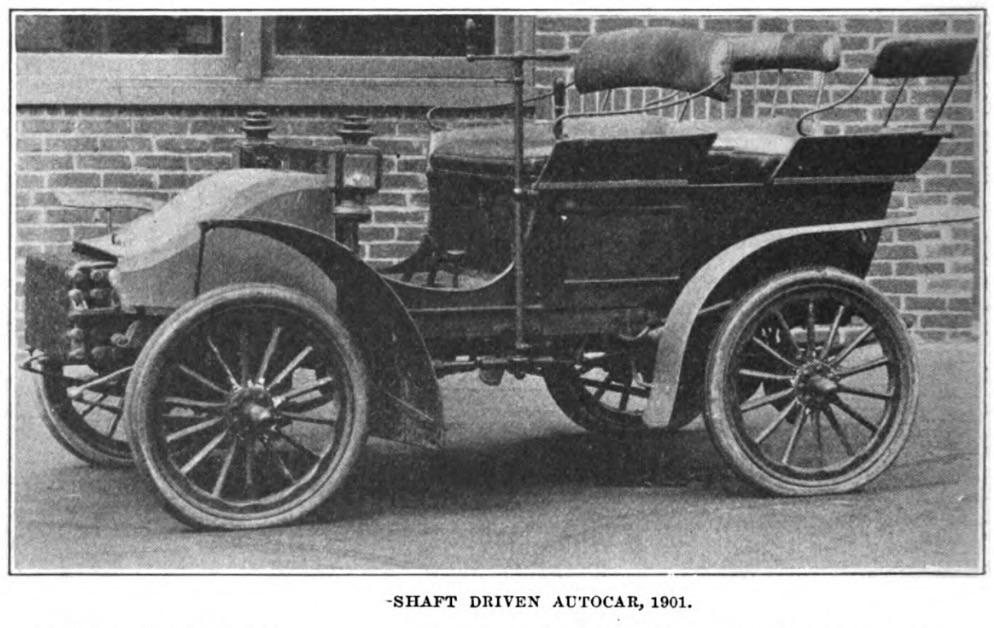
Autocar (1901)

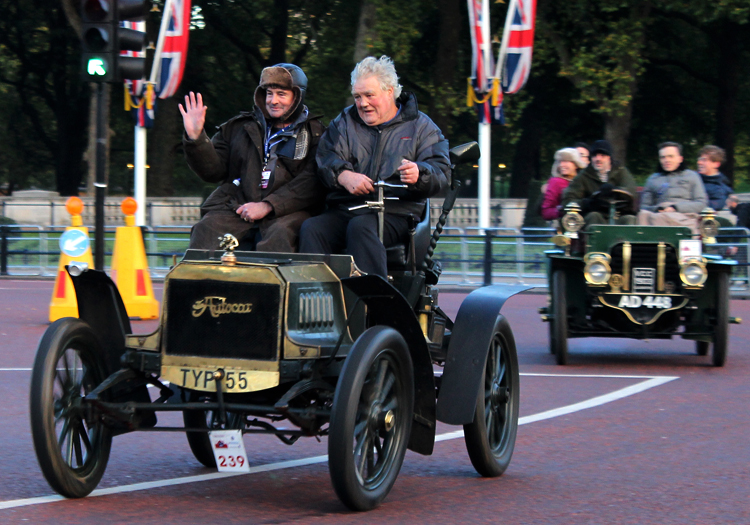
Autocar 12HP Tourer 1903

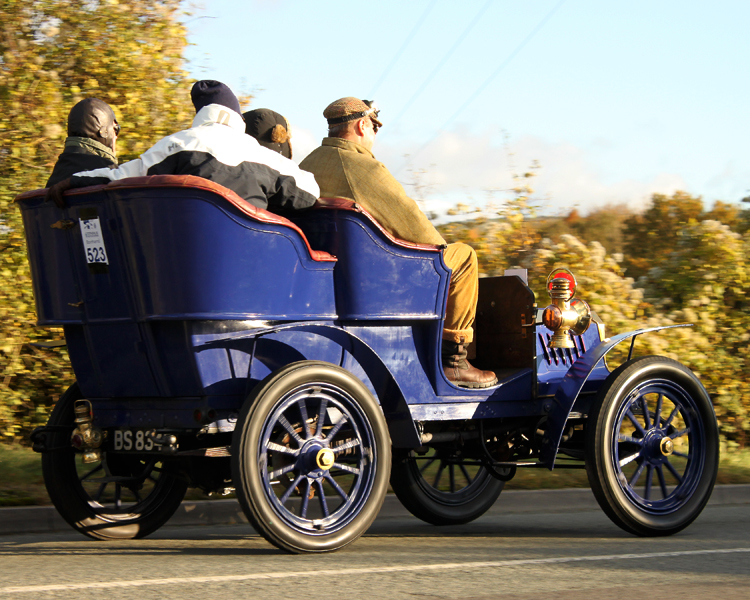
Autocar 12HP Tonneau 1904

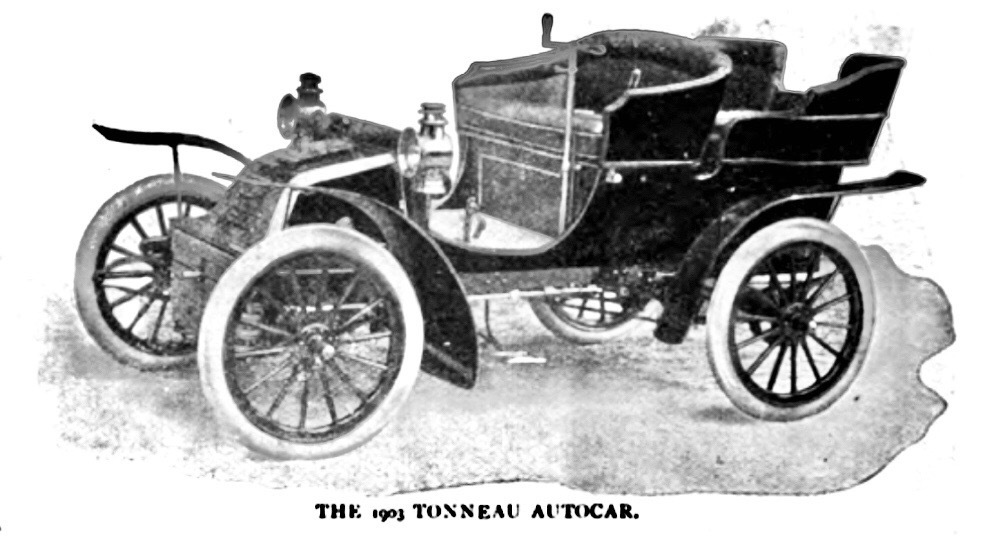
Autocar Type VII Tonneau (1903)

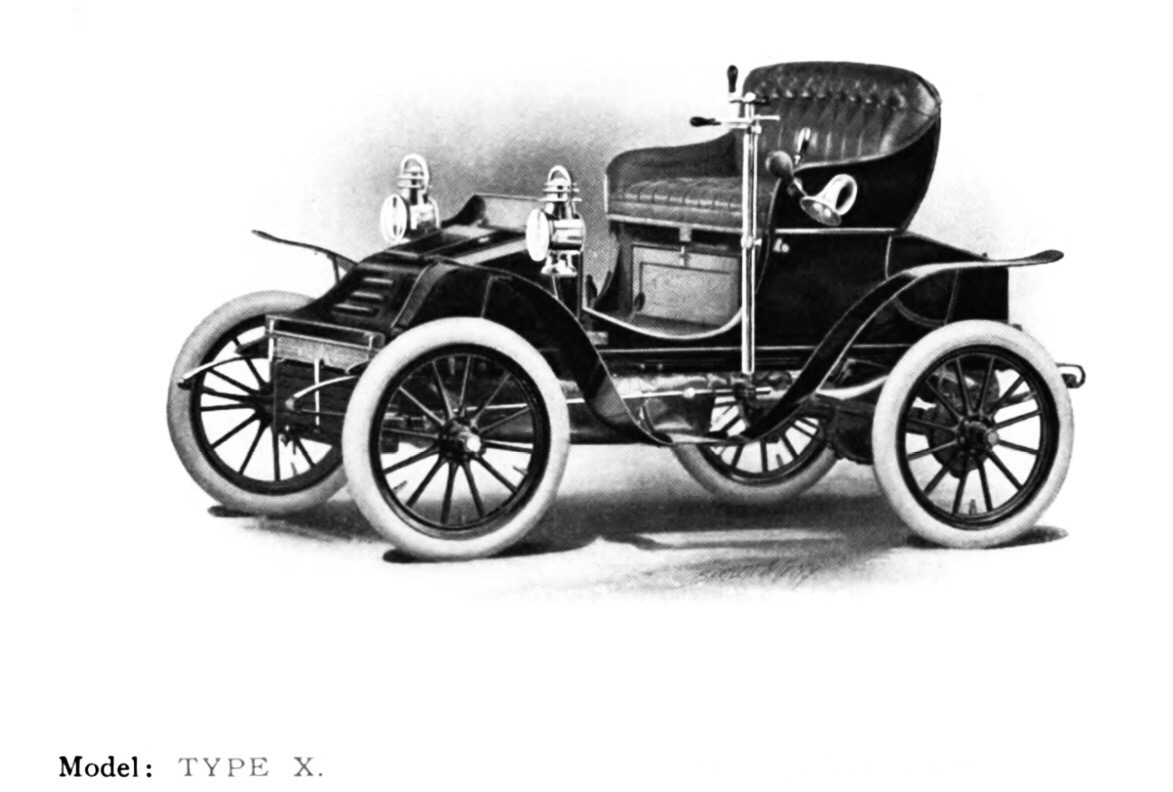
Autocar Type X (1904–1906)

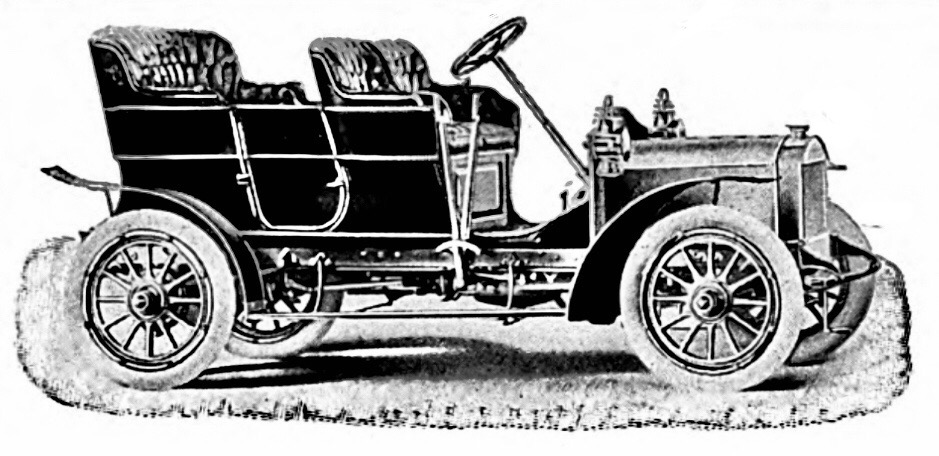
Autocar Type XI (1905)

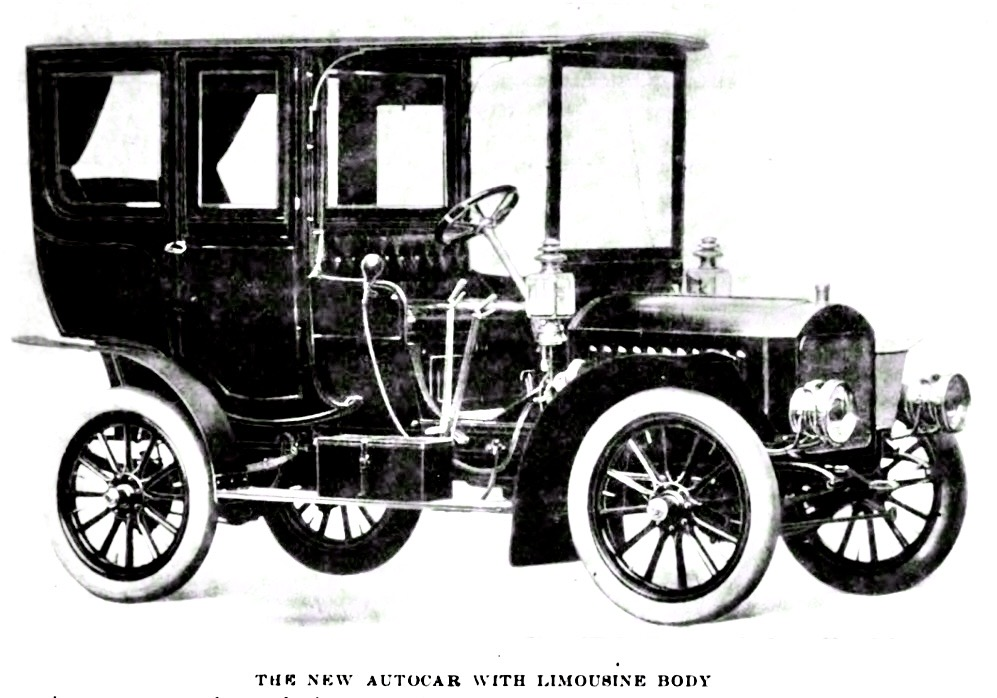
Autocar Typ XII 24 hp (1905–1908)

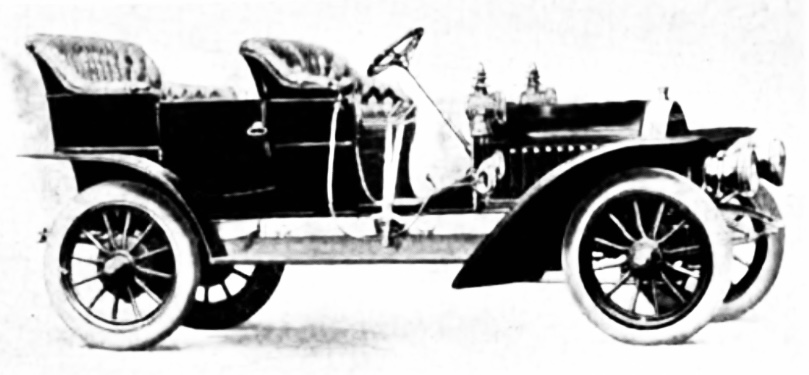
Autocar Model XIV (1907)

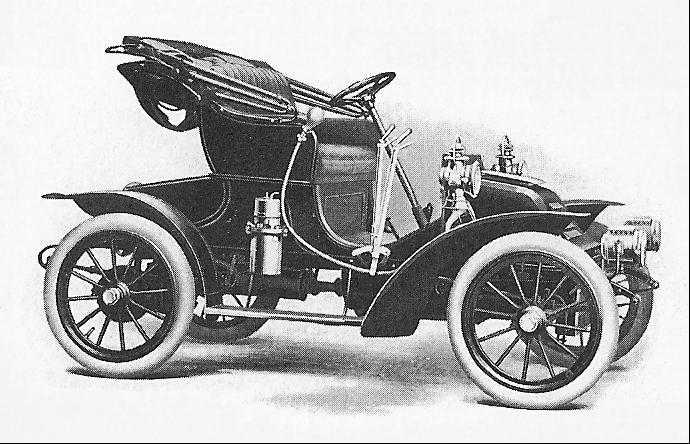
1908 Autocar XV

Clarke experimented with a series of vehicles from 1897, with a tricycle, later called "Autocar No. 1", now in the collection of the Smithsonian. In 1899 the company, now renamed Autocar, built the first motor truck ever produced for sale in North America. The first production Autocar automobile was a 1900 single cylinder chain drive runabout. About 27 were made. In 1901 Autocar built the first car in North America to use shaft drive. This vehicle is also now in the Smithsonian collection.

The 1904 Autocar was equipped with a tonneau; it could seat four passengers and sold for $1,700 (equivalent to $60,900 in 2025). The horizontal-mounted flat twin engine, situated at the front of the car, produced 11 hp (8.2 kW). This engine design was somewhat unusual for its time, as most companies were producing inline designs. A three-speed transmission was fitted. The steel and wood-framed car weighed 1675 lb (760 kg). The early cars had tiller steering.

In 1905, the company was selling the Type XII car for $2,250 (equivalent to $80,600 in 2025) and another car it called the Type X for $1,000 (equivalent to $35,800 in 2025). It discontinued the Type XI and sold the last of them in 1905. The cars then had wheel steering with left-hand drive.

The Type X was a runabout. During the 1905–1906 model year the company produced 1000 Type X cars. The manufacture of 500 Type XV runabouts was authorized for 1907 in place of 500 touring cars (Type XIV), in addition to the 1000 runabouts already planned. At special meeting on June 19, 1906, held at 711 Arcade Building, Philadelphia, Pennsylvania, the board authorized the hiring of a general manager by the name of Harry A. Gillis at a salary of $10,000 per year. Production of 300 Type XVI cars and 500 Type XVII were authorized during a board meeting on November 21, 1906.

Commercial vehicles were made the focus from 1907 and soon outnumbered cars.

As of 1911, Autocar was making only trucks. The first model, the Type XVII, had a 97-inch wheelbase, a one and a half-ton capacity, and a two-cylinder gasoline engine under the seat. Later engines had 4 and 6 cylinders, and wheelbases became longer. Inline engines became the company's focus.

During World War I, the Canadian Armoured Autocar used an Autocar chassis.

In 1929, Autocar sold 3300 units, though the number fell to 1000 in 1932 and continued to decline during the Great Depression. Larger trucks with "Blue Streak" gasoline engines and Diesel engines, mainly from Cummins, came later. In 1935, Autocar sold 1001 units and in 1936 it increased to 1451 trucks. In 1938, Autocar sold 1617 units and in 1939 it increased to 2014 trucks.

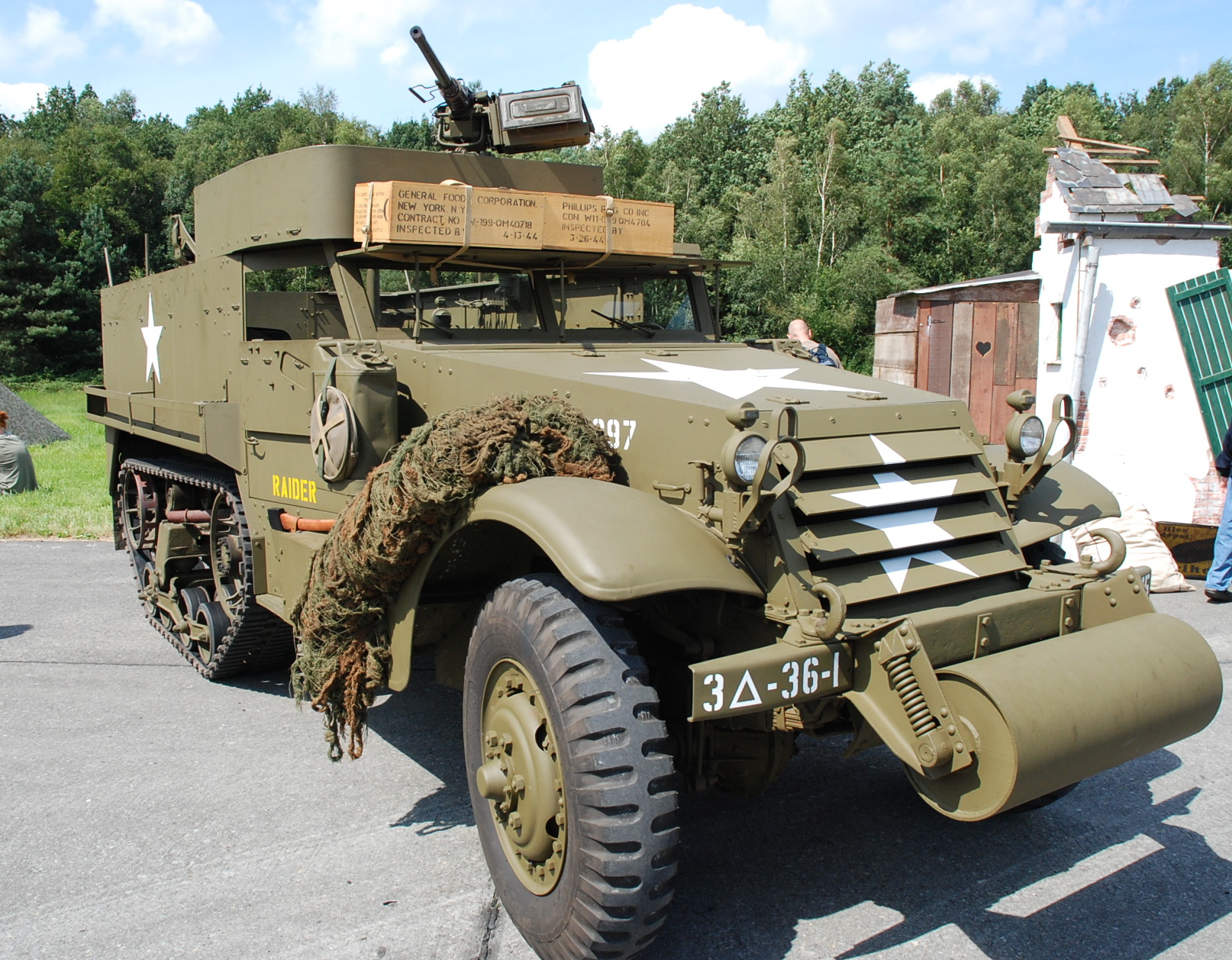
Autocar built a wide variety of transportation and combat vehicles during World War II, including the M2 half-track, M3 half-track (pictured), and M5 half-track

During World War II, Autocar supplied 50,000 units to the military, including specialty vehicles such as half-tracks; during its entire prewar history, the company had only built 70,000 units. Autocar ranked 85th among United States corporations in the value of World War II military production contracts. Civilian production resumed in 1944 and sales increased greatly after the war. Autocar soon had 100 dealers.

== Models ==
For specifications on various Autocar Company models:

- Autocar Type VIII
- Autocar Type X
- Autocar Type XI
- Autocar Type XII
- Autocar Type XIV
- Autocar Type XV
- Autocar Type XVIII
- Autocar Type XXI
- Autocar Type XXII
- Autocar Type XXIV
- Autocar Type XXI Commercial ·

=== Subsidiary of White Motor Corporation ===
The boom after the war ended quickly, however; and in 1953, Autocar sold out to White Motor Corporation, which made Autocar their top-of-the-line brand among their "Big Four" brand portfolio. The Ardmore plant was replaced in 1954 with a new plant in Exton, Pennsylvania, though the Ardmore plant burned while being torn down in 1956 and the fire could have destroyed a neighborhood.

AP off-road vehicles became an important product for Autocar. The 1964 AP19 shown in September 2007 at a Golden Age Truck Museum exhibit "has a GCW of 900,000 lbs, a 30,000lb front axle, planetary rear axles rated at 200,000 lbs, and was originally powered with a 525 HP Cummins V-12 diesel which was later replaced with a 6-cylinder Cummins KT rated at 750 HP."

Most Autocar trucks continued to use the Autocar Driver Cab; in 1977 Autocar launched the Construcktor 2 model which used the Xpeditor cab that had recently been launched by sister-company, White.

The Exton plant ended production in 1980, with production moving to the modern White plant in Ogden, Utah.

=== White, Volvo and GMC ===
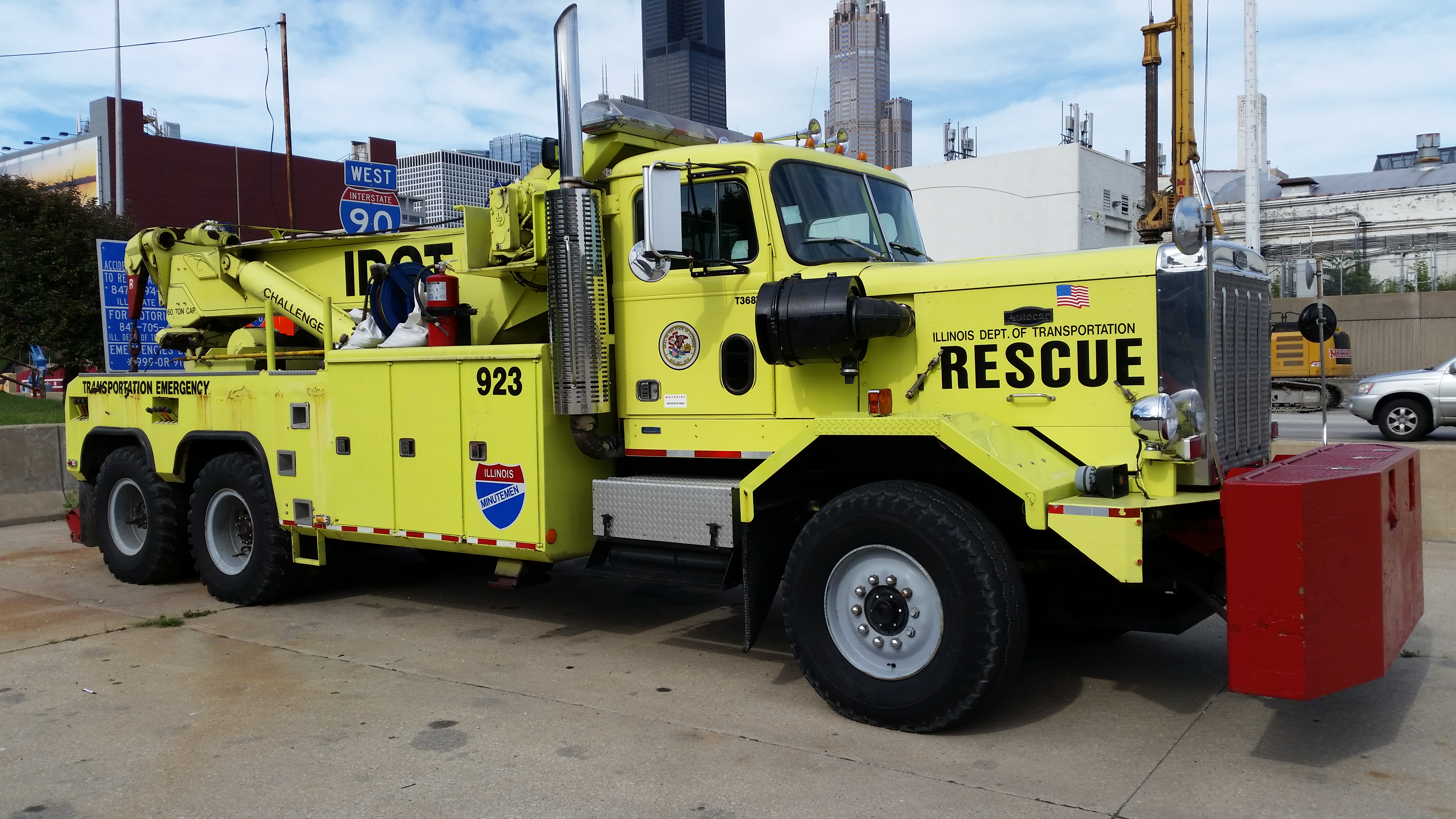
1987 Autocar DK-64 wrecker with 60 ton lift

Shortly after the move to Utah in 1980, with White insolvent, in 1981 AB Volvo acquired the U.S. assets and brands to become Volvo-White LLC. Volvo produced trucks under both the White and Autocar brands and Autocar continued as the division focused on severe-duty trucks. The Autocar DK severe-duty line was launched in 1983 and, as a replacement of the DC line, was used in heavy dump truck, concrete mixer, refuse, and oil field applications, among many others. Also launched in 1983 was the Autocar AT64F, a top-of-the-line long-haul tractor marketed as "The Legend". The last traditional Autocar with a "Custom Driver Cab" was made in Ogden on December 18, 1987. In 1988, the DK was replaced by the Autocar ACL and ACM models, which used the White Xpeditor cab, first used by Autocar in the Construcktor 2 model. While the AC-series trucks were tough and reliable, they incorporated an expanded number of Volvo components and, for some Autocar loyalists, marked a dilution of the Autocar brand.

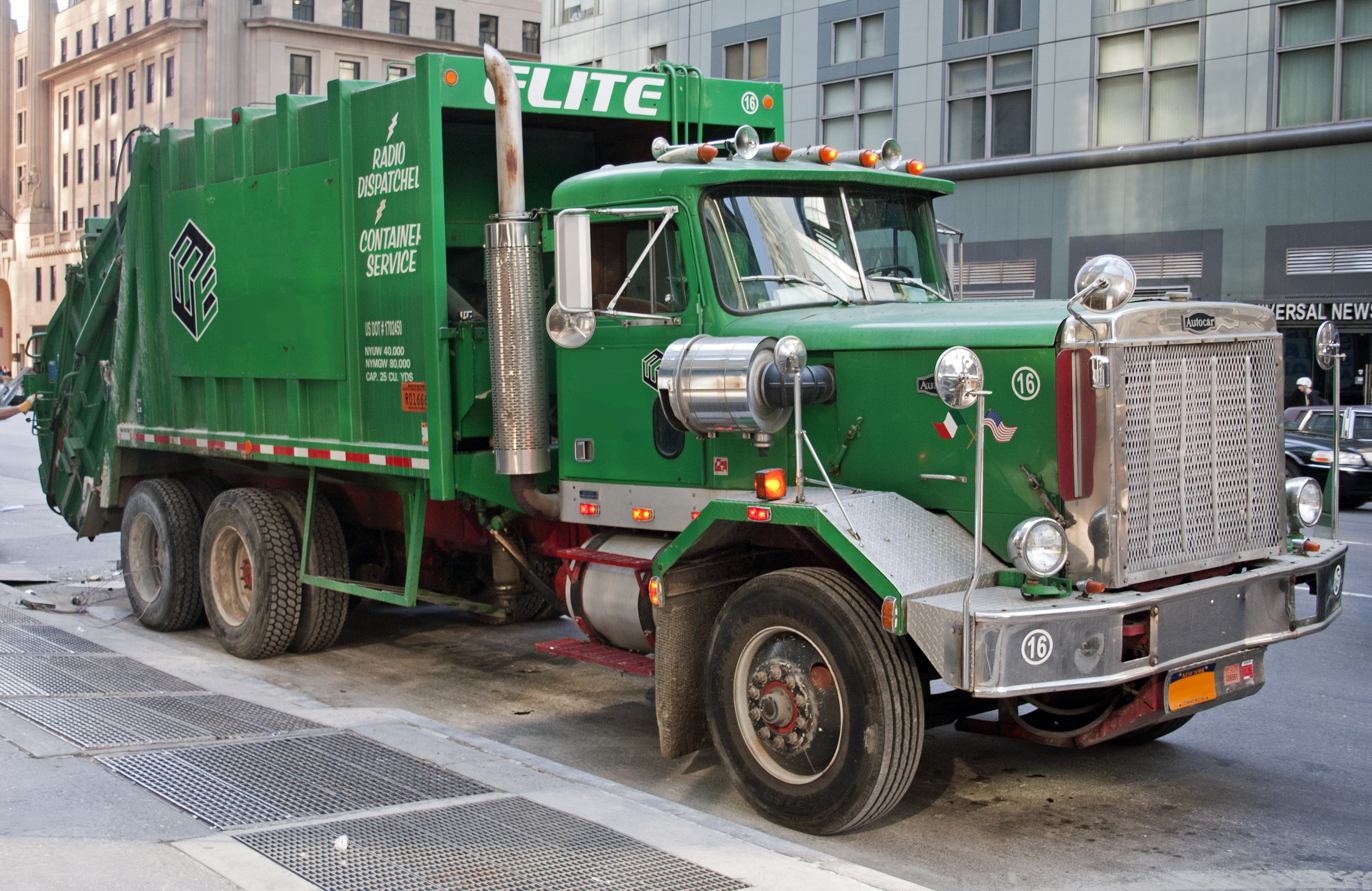
1987 Autocar garbage truck

Volvo-White bought GMC's heavy truck business in 1987 creating the Volvo WhiteGMC brand. Volvo later dropped any reference to White but used the Autocar bow-tie emblem on the radiator and hood side panels. In 1996 "Autocar" became a truck model name.

Autocar remained a part of Volvo until 2001. When Volvo acquired the North American operations of Renault Trucks in 2000, including its wholly owned subsidiary Mack Trucks, the merged company would have had an excess or anti-competitive share of the refuse truck market sector. Volvo agreed to sell select designs for the Xpeditor low cab-forward severe-duty products, intellectual properties, and the Autocar brand to Highland Park, Illinois-based Grand Vehicle Works Holdings, LLC (GVW Group). Autocar used the Xpeditor cab developed by White in the Autocar ACL and ACM conventional truck models and had also used it in the earlier Autocar Construcktor 2 conventional truck model, beginning in 1977.

== Contemporary activities ==
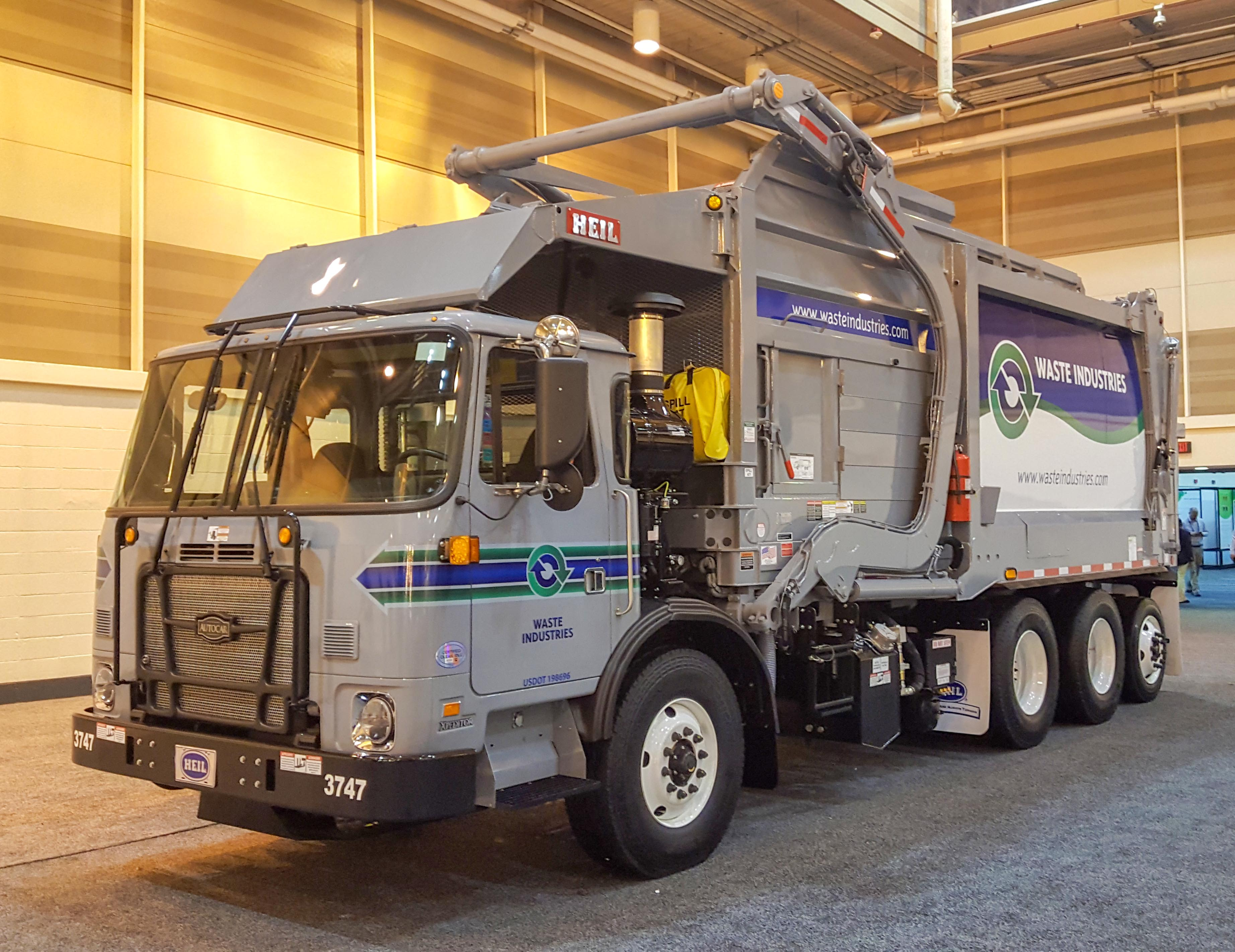
2017 Autocar Xpeditor (ACX) refuse truck

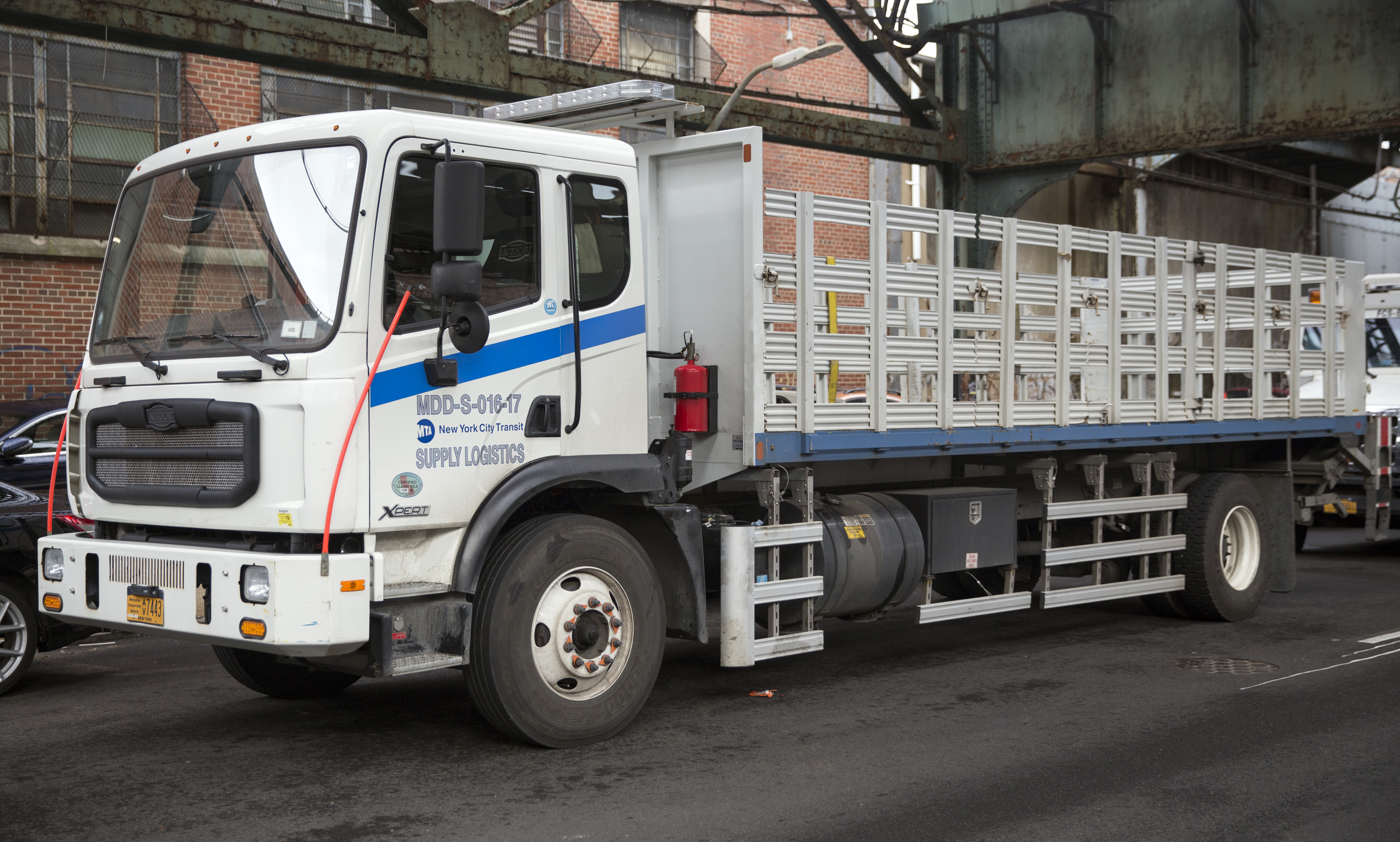
Autocar Xpert (ACMD)

Autocar announced on September 13, 2017, that it had opened a second, 1.2 million square-foot manufacturing site in Birmingham, Alabama.

Since 2012, Autocar also builds a medium-duty vocational truck series called the Xpert (ACMD). It uses a 2–3 person cab made by Chinese Qixing (QX-PW21TGD). Autocar has also offered the Xpert with dual-steering system for garbage truck service.

Autocar announced on May 7, 2019, the relaunch of the DC conventional truck that had been the core of Autocar's business from the 1950s through the 1970s. The relaunched DC is completely new and reported to have several unique features, such as the first 160,000 PSI steel frame rails, an upgraded electrical system, and a cab that fits three workers and is designed for serviceability, with a full steel structure inside the dashboard and aluminum sheets as dash panels. The first version released is the DC-64R, which is purpose-built for refuse applications. Another unique feature of the DC is that Autocar mounts full roll-off hoist bodies on the Autocar production line, avoiding numerous problems when modifications are made after production. Additional variations of the DC announced include the DC-64D for dump trucks, the DC-64M for concrete mixer trucks, and the DC-64P specifically for concrete pump trucks.

On May 13, 2021, Autocar announced the launch of the E-ACTT, a fully electric terminal tractor. Autocar had first introduced electric trucks in 1923.

=== Current truck models ===
- ACMD class 7/8 medium/heavy-duty cabover
- ACTT terminal tractor and E-ACTT electric terminal tractor
- ACX class 8 severe-duty cabover
- DC-64D, DC-84D class 8 conventional for dump trucks
- DC-64M class 8 conventional for concrete mixers
- DC-64P class 8 conventional for concrete pumps
- DC-64R class 8 conventional for refuse
- DC-64T class 8 conventional tractor

=== Current truck vocations ===
- Aircraft and military support trucks, such as tankers and Scissor lift trucks.
- Concrete mixer trucks
- Concrete pump trucks
- Dump trucks
- Refuse trucks
- Road Maintenance trucks, such as Paint Stripers, Heavy-Duty Street Sweepers, and Water Blasters
- Terminal tractors (also known as yard trucks)

=== Historic trucks ===
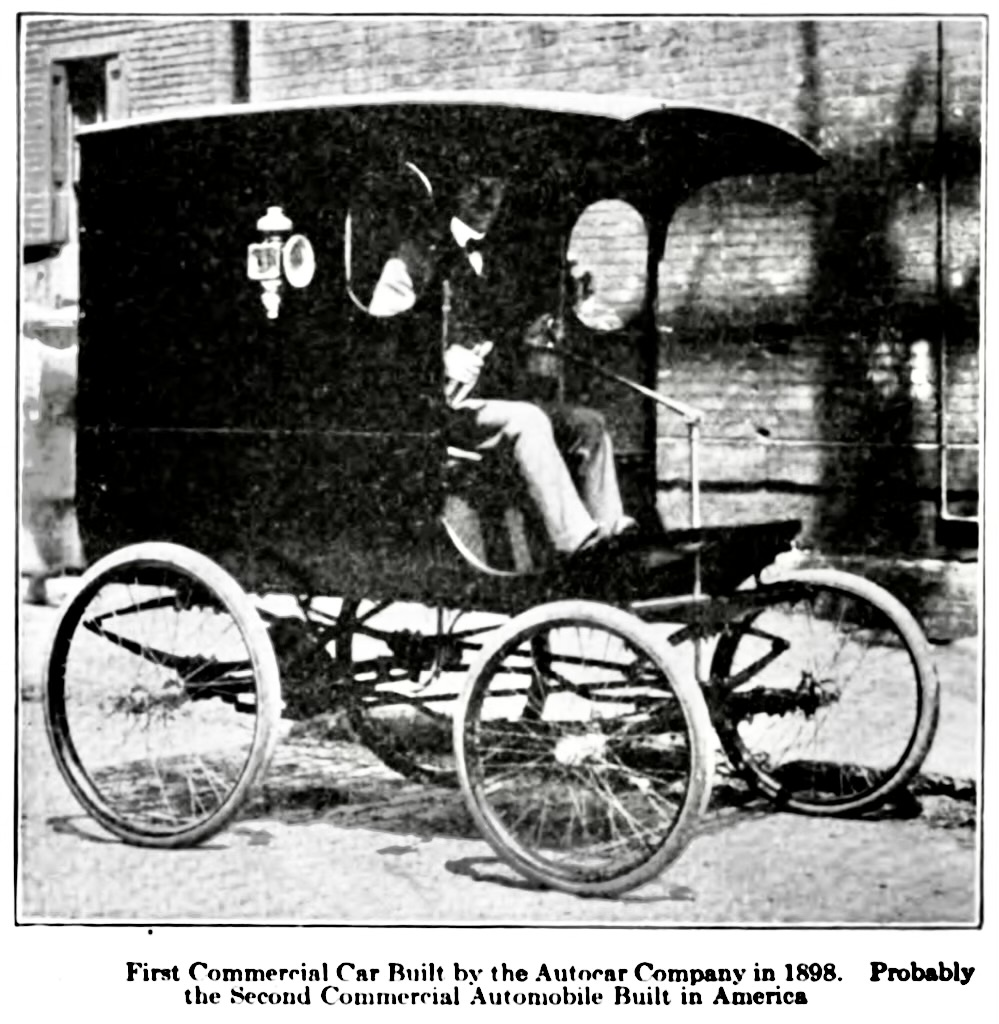
Autocar (1898)

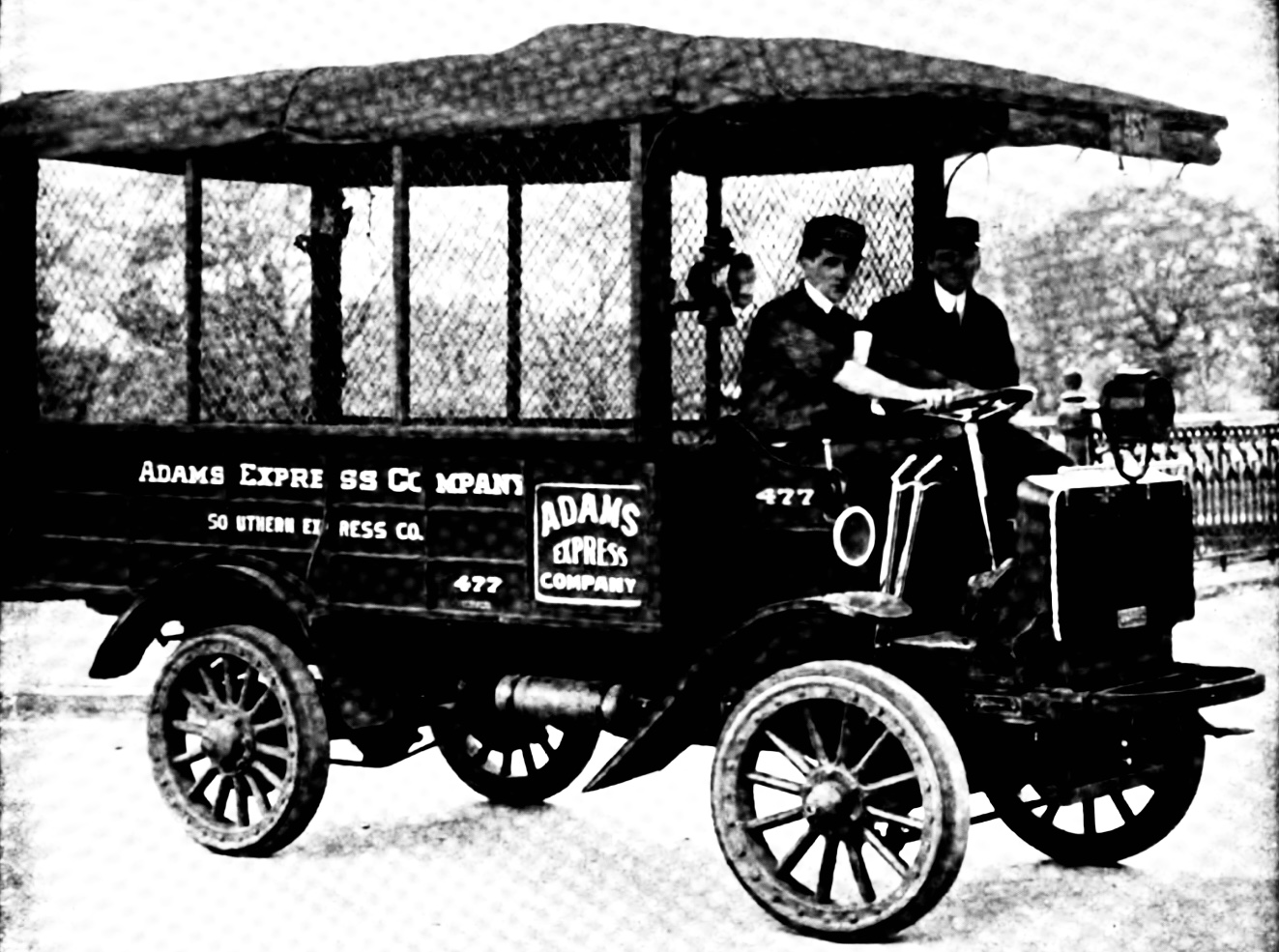
Autocar Type XXI

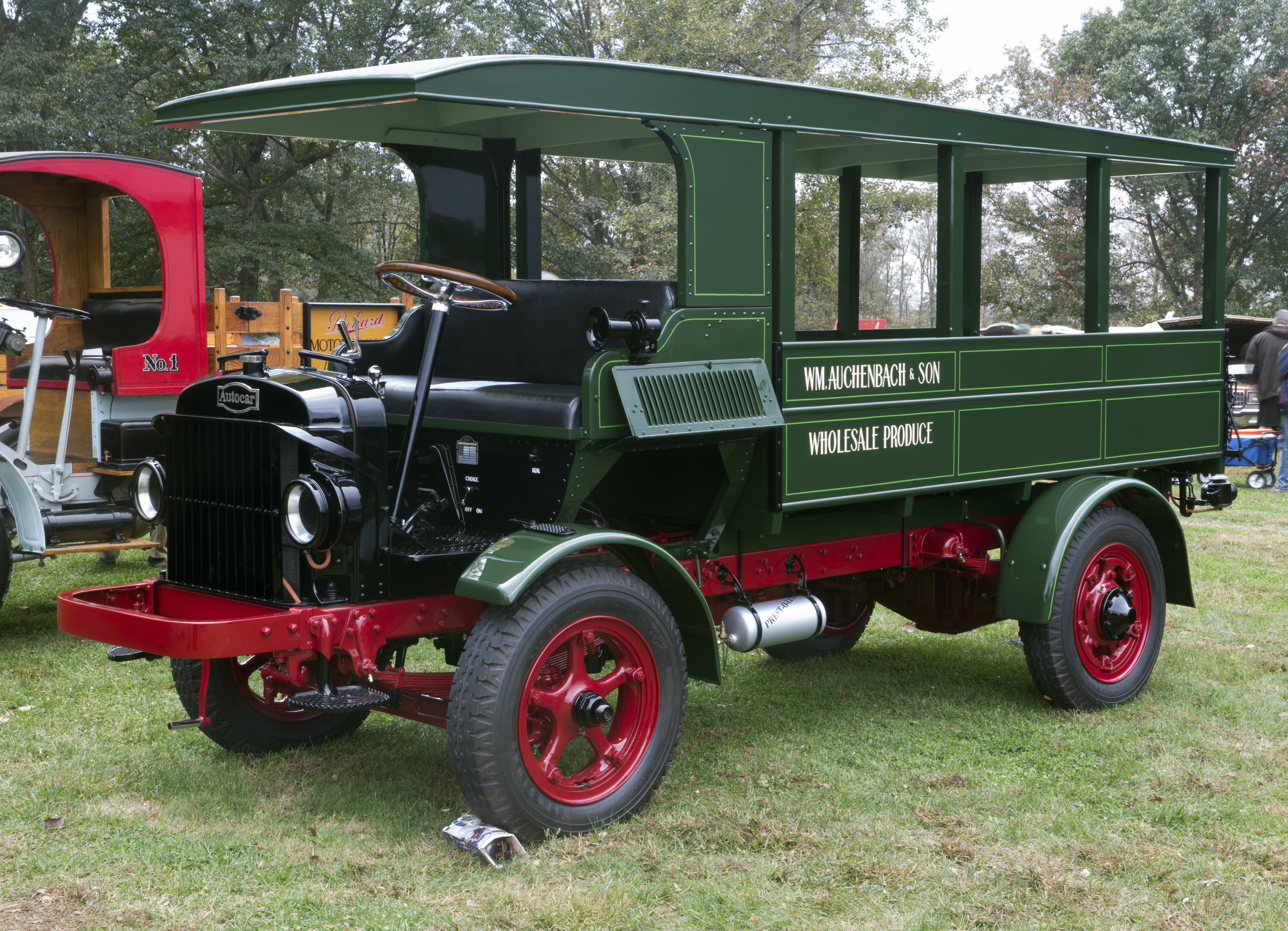
1920s era Under-Seat engined Autocar Delivery truck

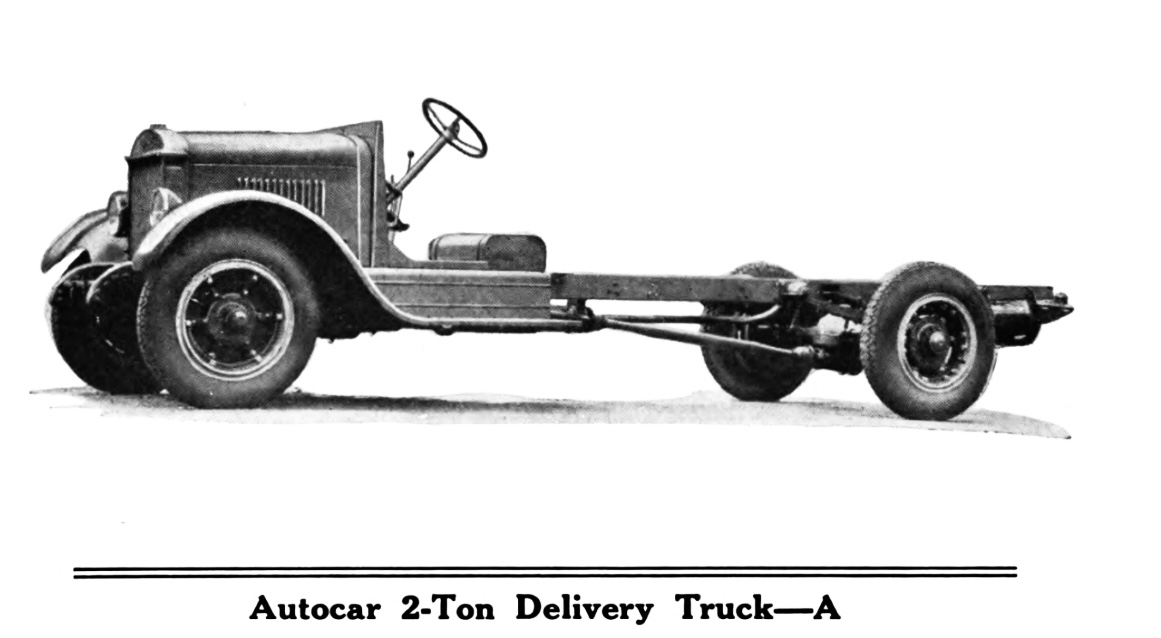
Autocar A (1926–1932)

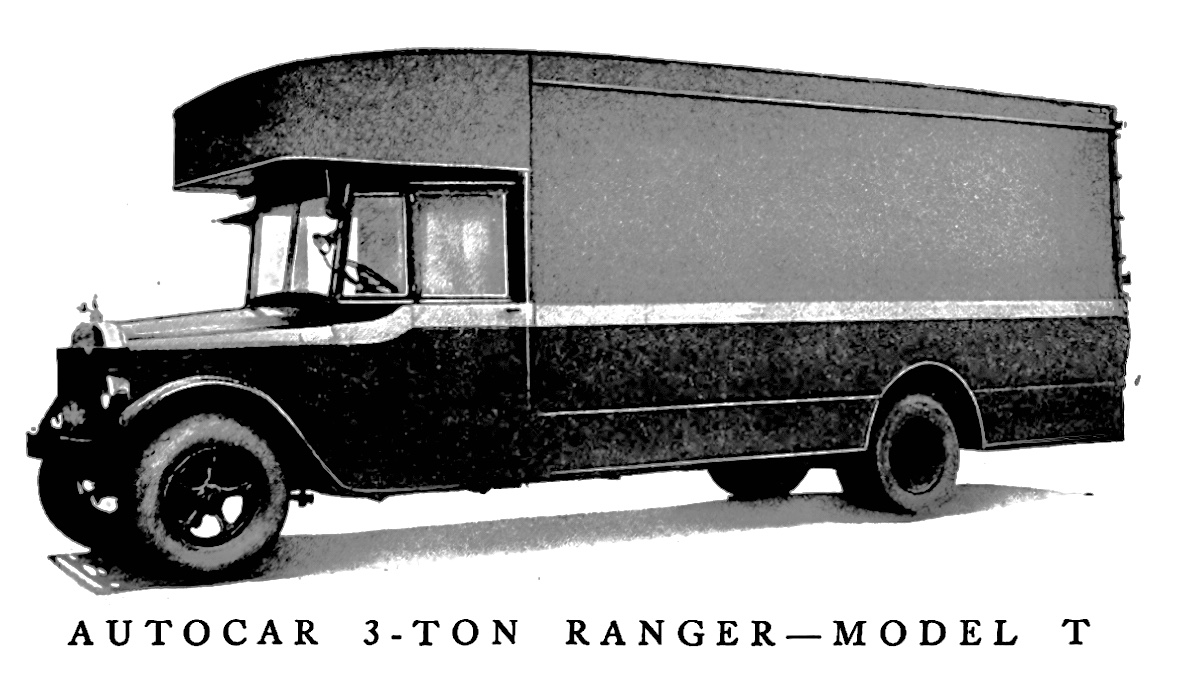
Autocar T Ranger (1927–1929)

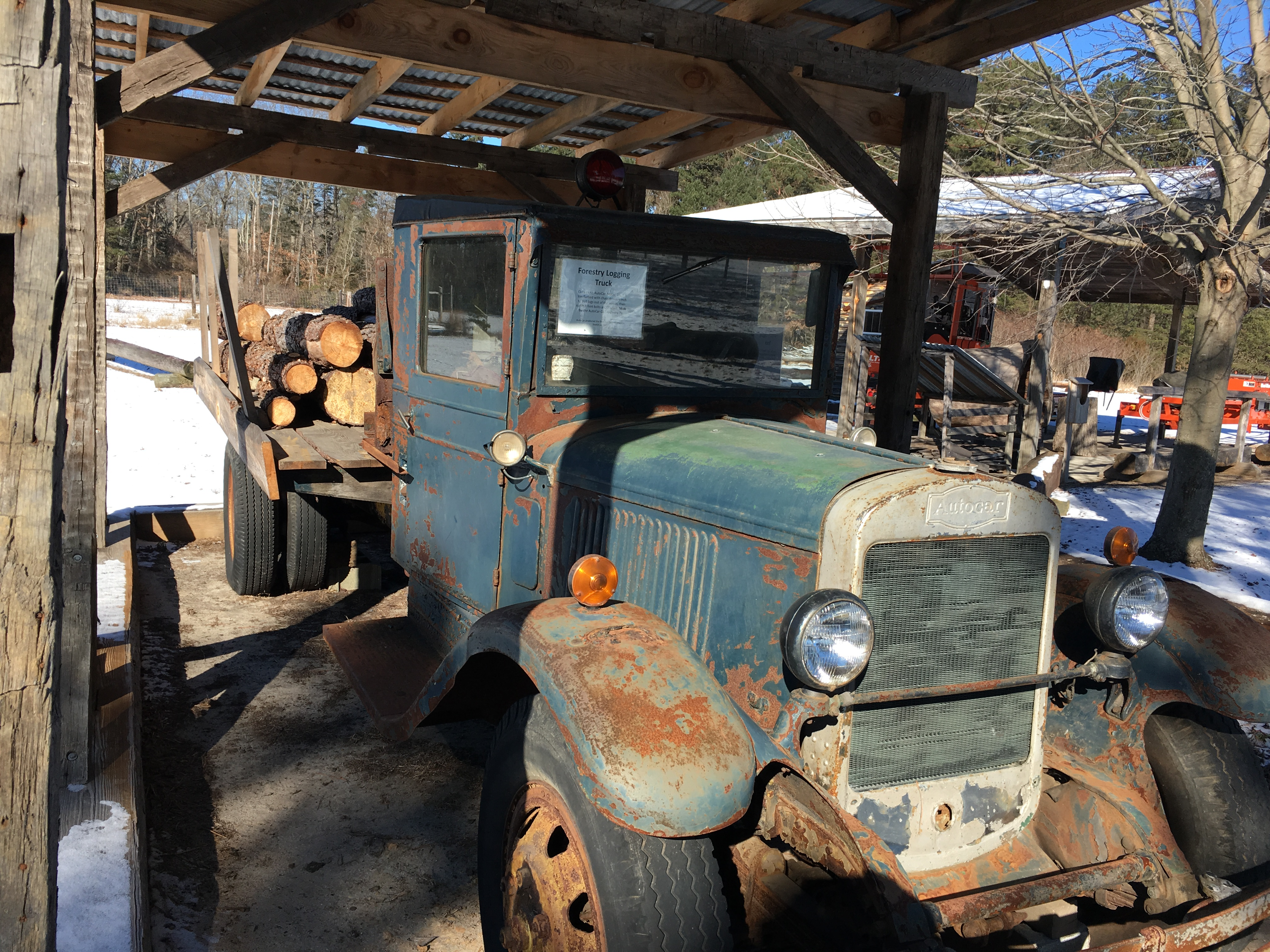
c. 1930 Autocar Model DA logging truck

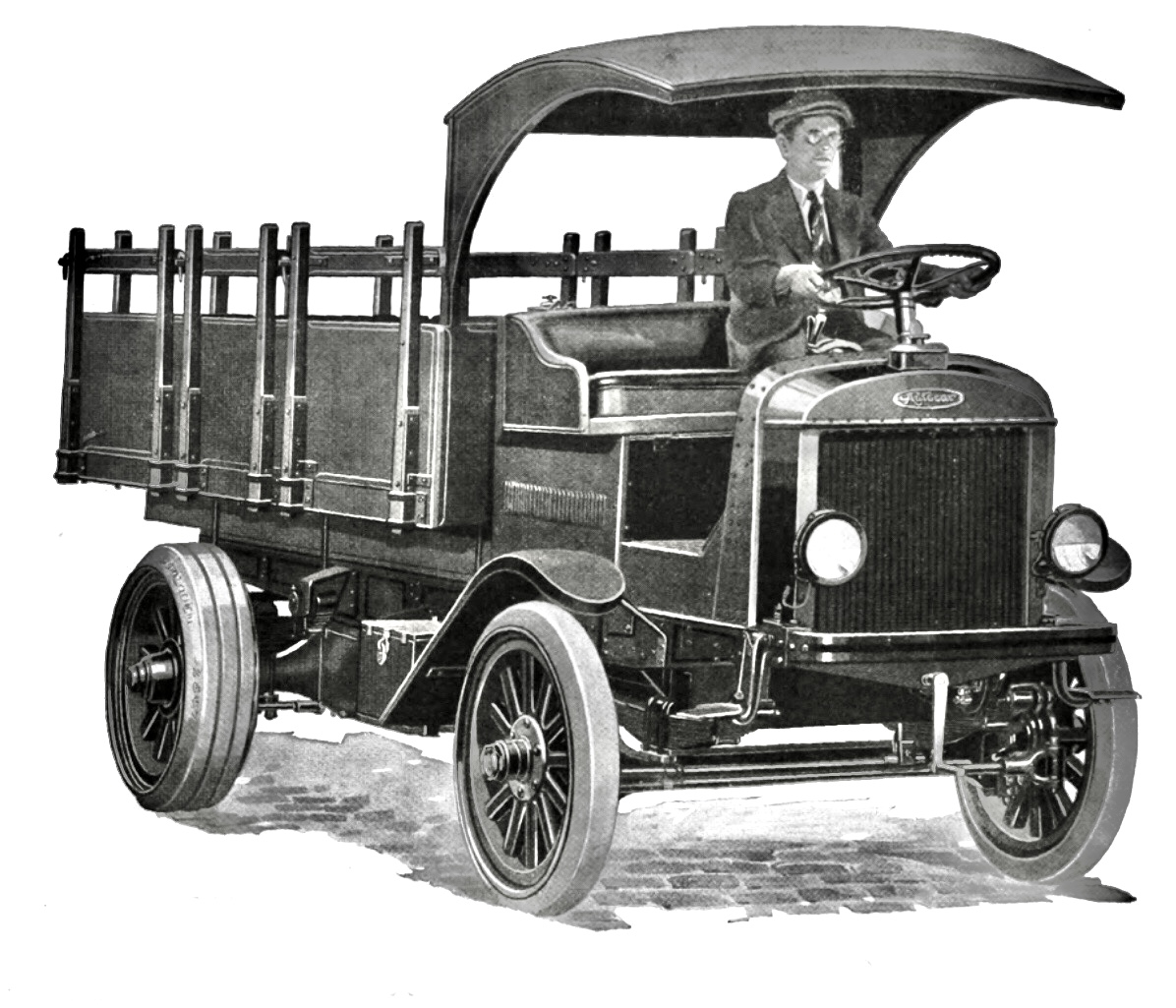
Autocar 21 UG (1919) 2t

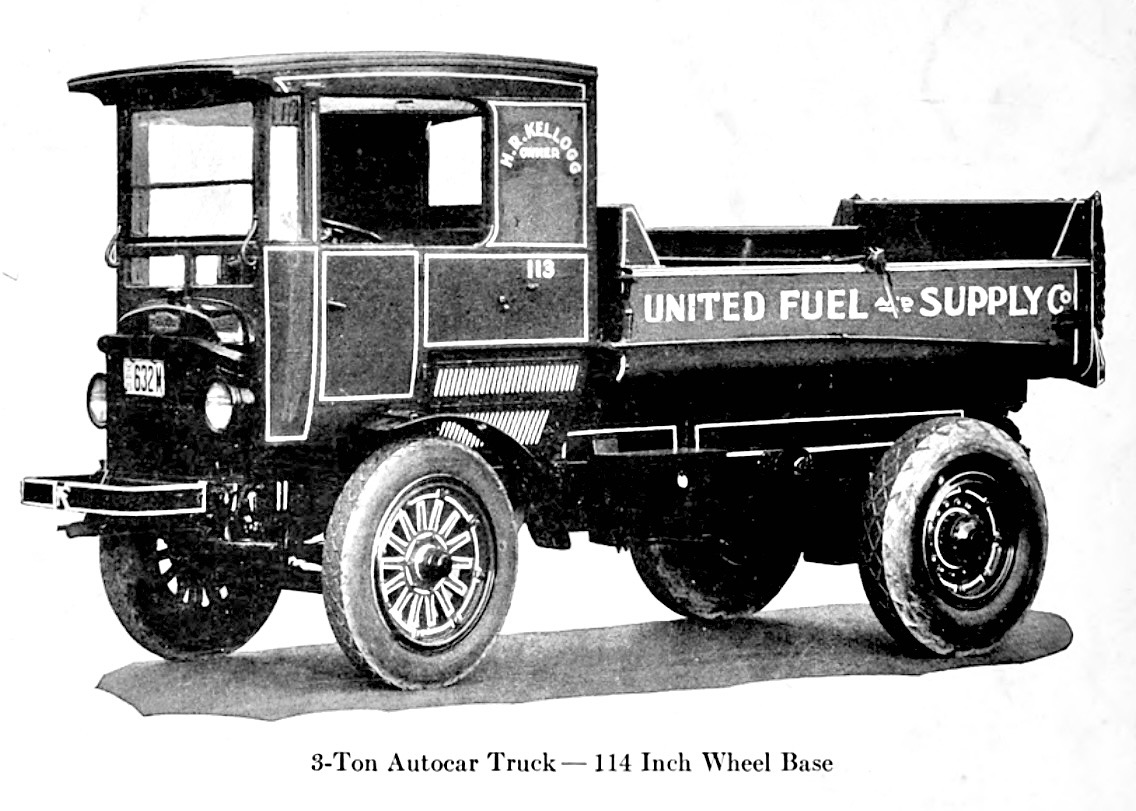
Autocar 3to (1926–1931)

- "Delivery Wagon" – The first motor truck in the Western Hemisphere, 1899
- Type XVIII – Restart of Autocar truck production, announced 1907
- Type XXI – 1908 to 1926
- Type XXVI – 4- to 6-ton, 1919–1925
- Type XXVII – 2- to 3-ton, 1921–1925
- A64, A75 & A102 – Aluminum, lightweight
- ACL & ACM – Conventionals, used the Xpeditor cab, 1990 to 2001
- ACX E3 – Hydraulic hybrid-drive truck, 2010 to 2017
- AP – Extreme-Duty, with planetary axles
- AT64F – "The Legend" semi-tractor 1983–1988
- AU – Short-hood Aluminum
- C – Gasoline Conventionals
- CK – Half-Cab
- Construcktor (previously KK93) & Construcktor 2 (used the Xpeditor cab)
- DC – Diesel Conventional from 1939 to 1984, relaunched in 2019
- DCU – Short-hood
- Dispatch (also produced as the Soviet ZIS-5.)
- DK – Diesel Conventional from 1984
- DS – Lighter-weight trucks for construction and refuse 1983–1987
- E1, E3 & E5 – Electric trucks in the 1920s
- KK – Construction model from 1974
- RB/RL/RM – Conventionals 1937–1940
- UD/UN/US/UT, etc. – Engine-under-the-seat/Cabover 1933–1937
- UA/UB/U-10 to U-90 – Engine-under-the-seat/Cabover 1935–1952
- WX "Xpeditor" – Cabover, 2001 to 2009
- WXLL "Xpeditor" – Low-entry cabover, 2001 to 2009

=== Production figures Autocar trucks ===
Year	Production figures	Model	Load capacity	Serial number
1913		21 F		
1914				
1915	~ 1000	XXIF	1,5 to	12601 to 13600
1916	~ 2775	21UF	2 to	14601 to 17375
1917	~ 3400	21UF	2 to	17376 to 20775
1918	~ 2825	UF	2 to	20776 to 23600
1919	~ 3044	21 UF	2 to	23601 to 26644
	~ 600	21 UG	2 to	87 to 686
1920	~ 2872	XXI-F	2 to	26645 to 29516
	~ 1106	XXI-G	2 to	687 to 1792
	~ 53	XXVI-Y	3,5 to	75001 to 75053
	~ 53	XXVI-B	2 to	90001 to 90053
1921	~ 1531	XXI-UF	2 to	29517 to 31047
	~ 693	XXI-UG	2 to	1793 to 2485
	~ 96	XXVI-Y	5 to	75054 to 75149
	~ 258	XXVI-B	5 to	90054 to 90311
1922	~ 830	21UF	2 to	31048 to 31877
	~ 260	21UG	2 to	2486 to 2745
	~ 2,097	27H	3 to	40001 to 41097
	~ 595	27K	3 to	60001 to 60595
	~ 344	26Y	6 to	75423 to 75766
	~ 187	26B	6 to	90312 to 90498
1926		F	1-2 to	
		G	1-2 to	
1930	~ 2,013			
1931	~ 1,752			
1941	414	U 7144 T	4-5 to	
	92	U 8144 T	5-6 to	
1942	3,281	U 7144 T	4-5 to	
	832	U 8144 T	5-6 to	
1943	2,795	U 7144 T	4-5 to	
	1,236	U 8144 T	5-6 to	
1944	3,090	U 7144 T	4-5 to	
	785	U 8144 T	5-6 to	
1945	1,525	U 7144 T	4-5 to	
	374	U 8144 T	5-6 to	
Sum				

== Gallery ==
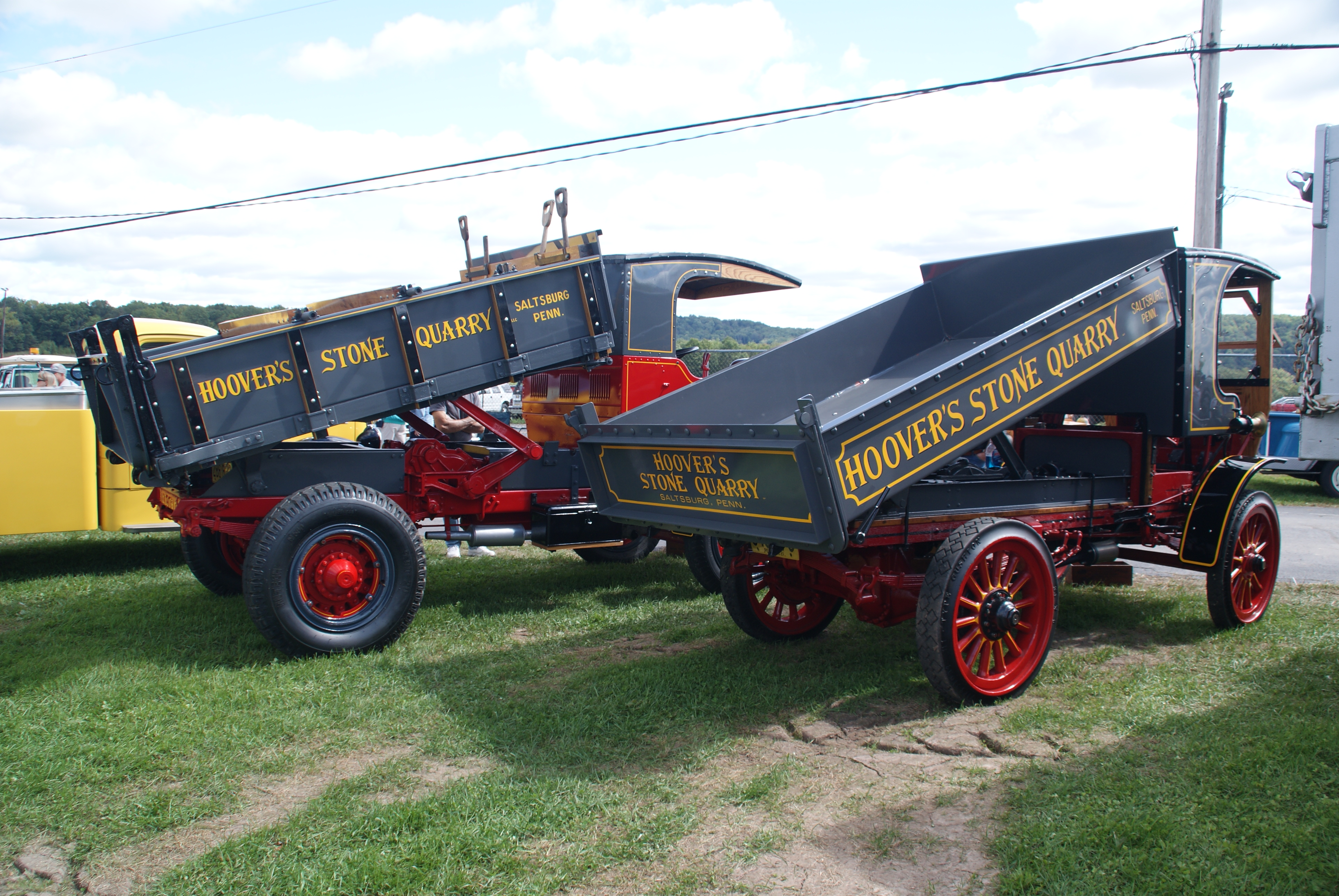
Autocar dump hoists

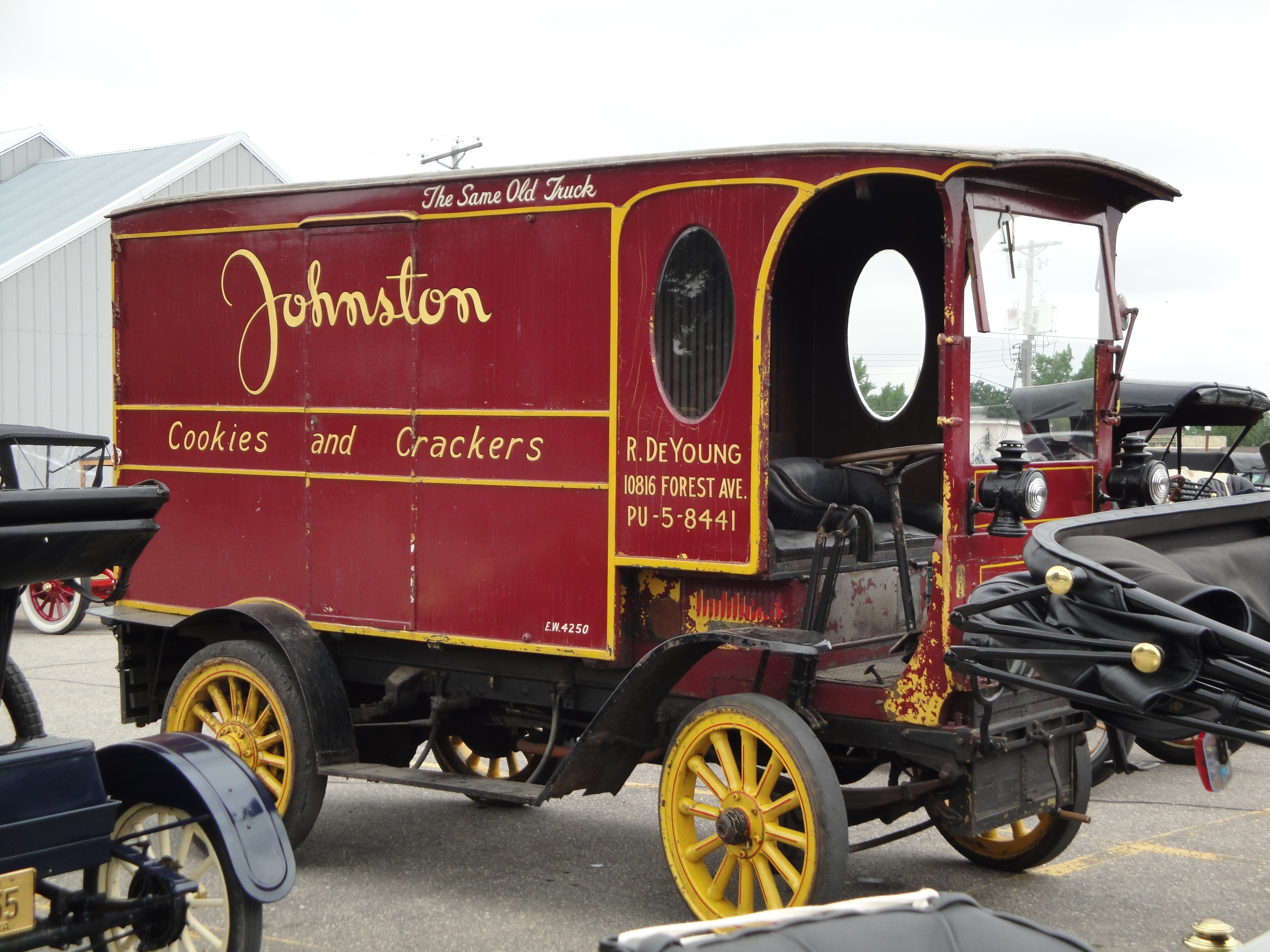
Early Autocar delivery truck

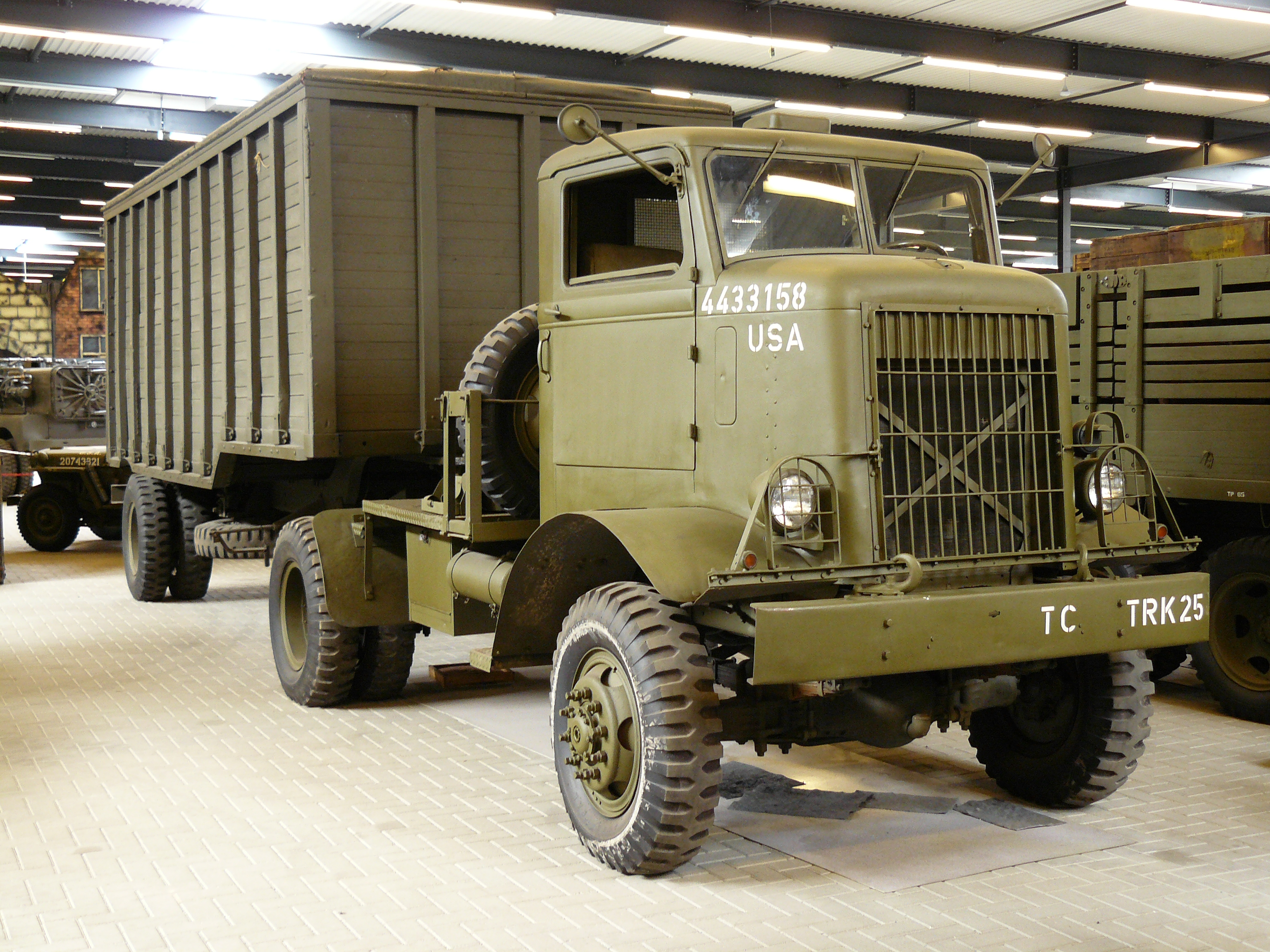
World War II Autocar tractor

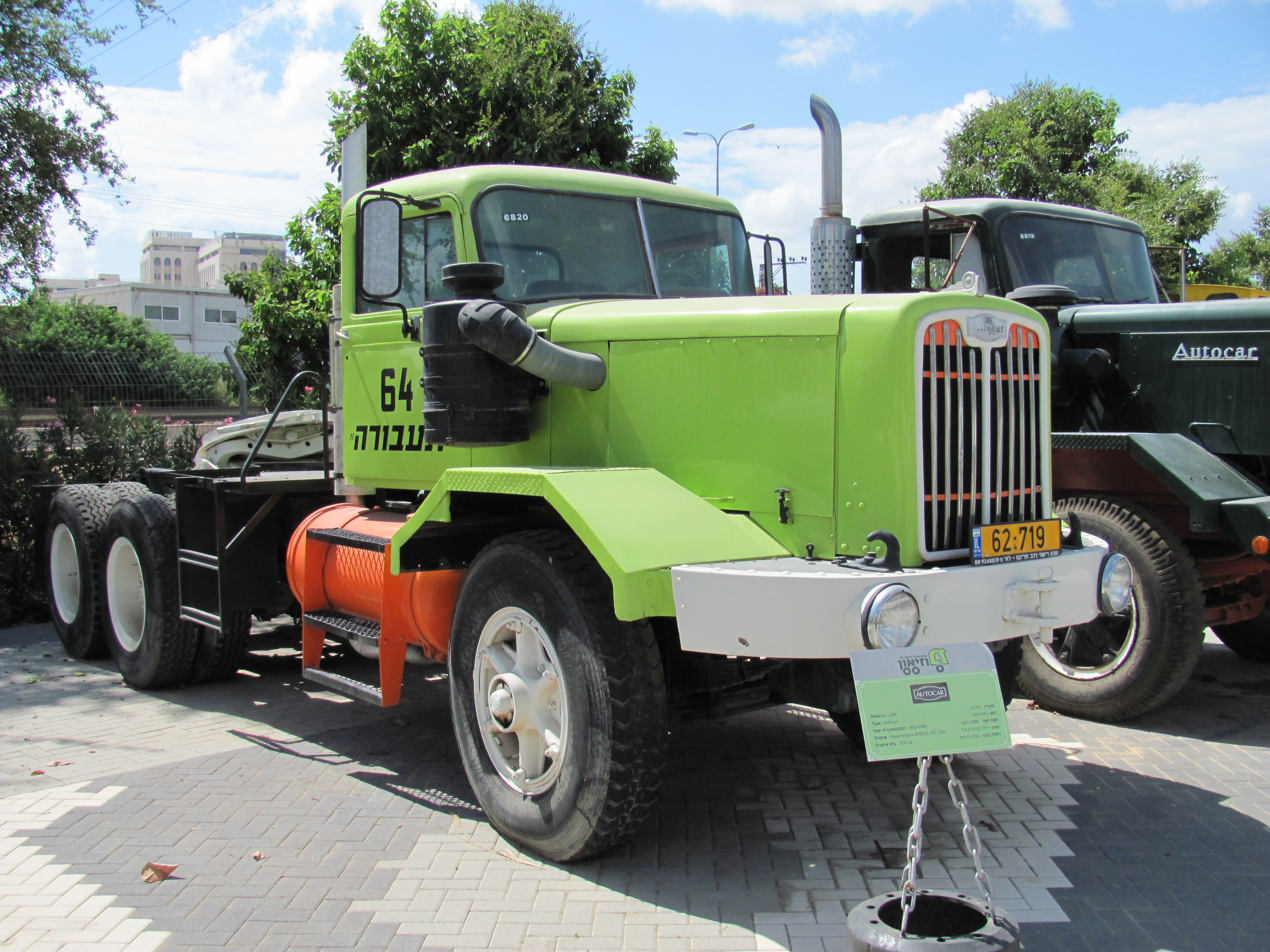
1950 and 1971 Autocar tractors

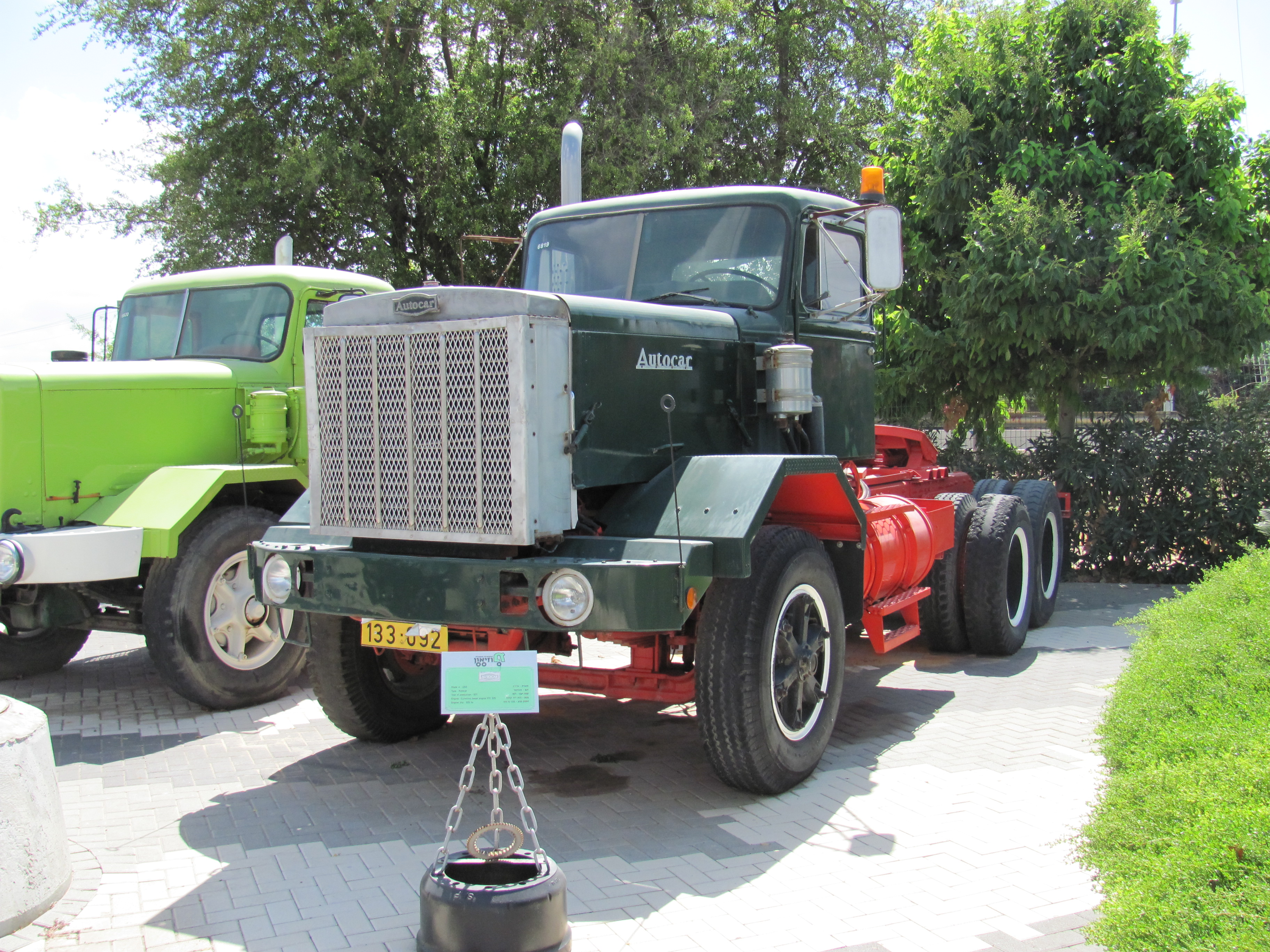
1971 Autocar tractor

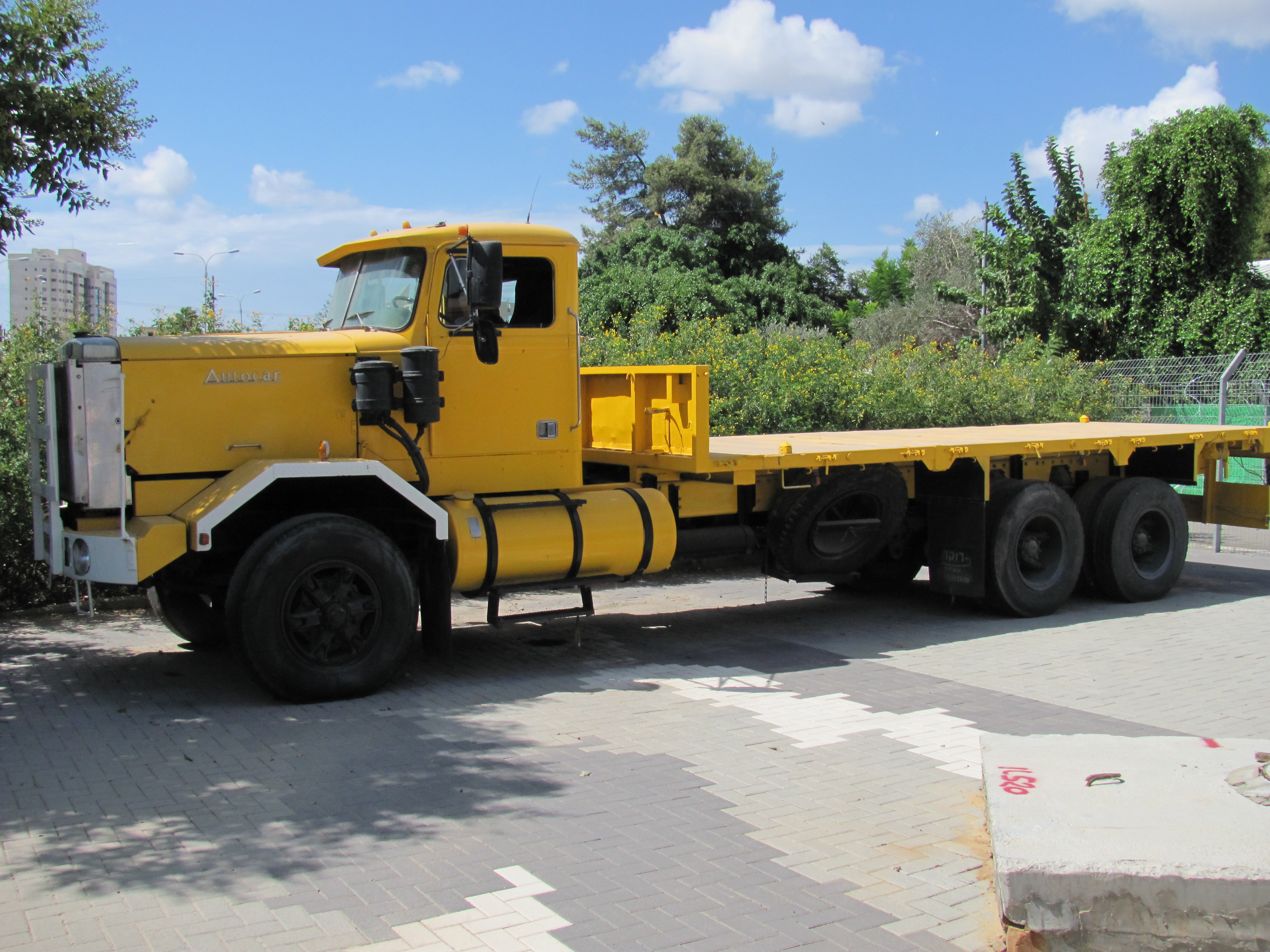
1971 Autocar flatbed

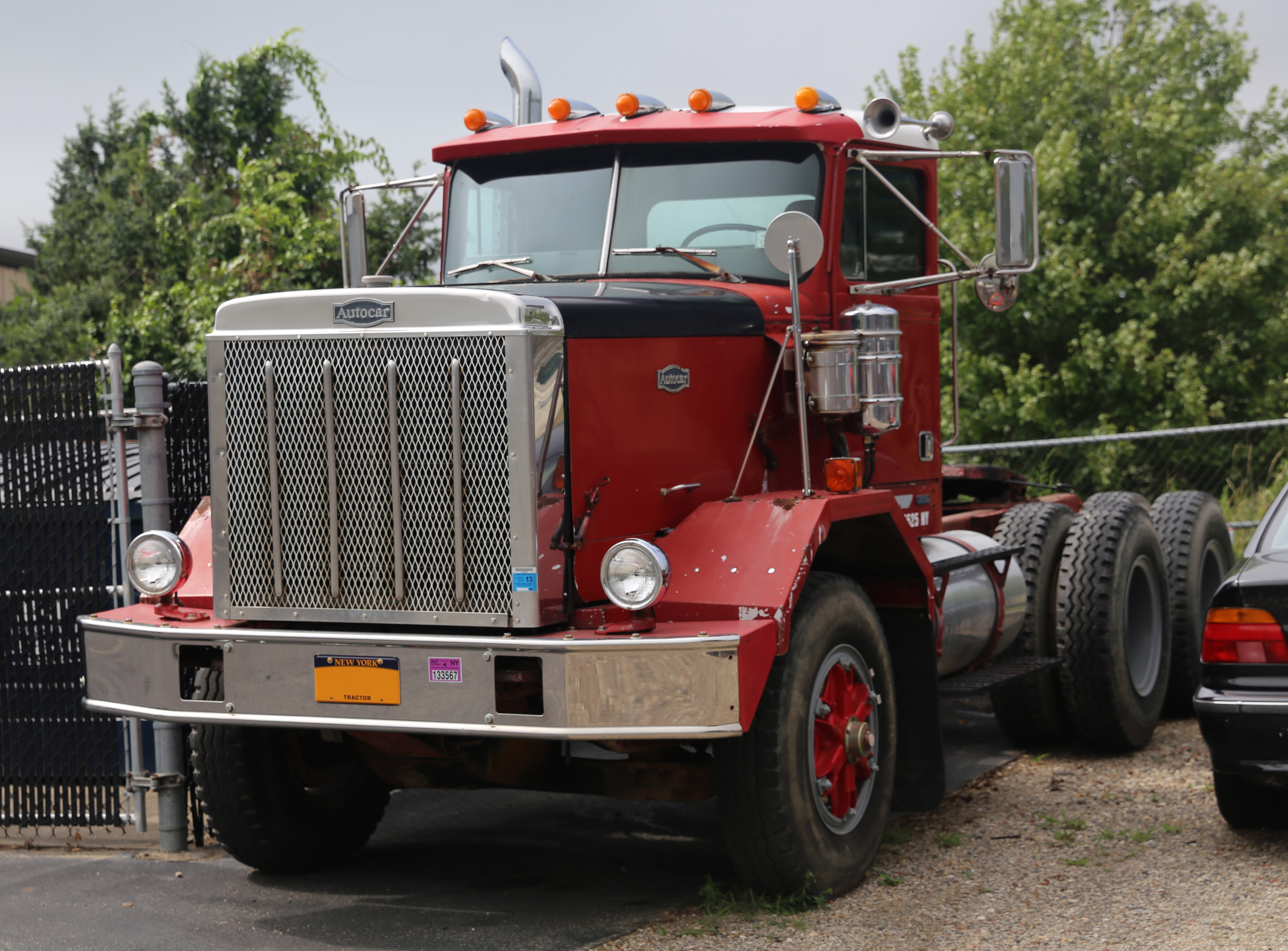
1987 Autocar tractor

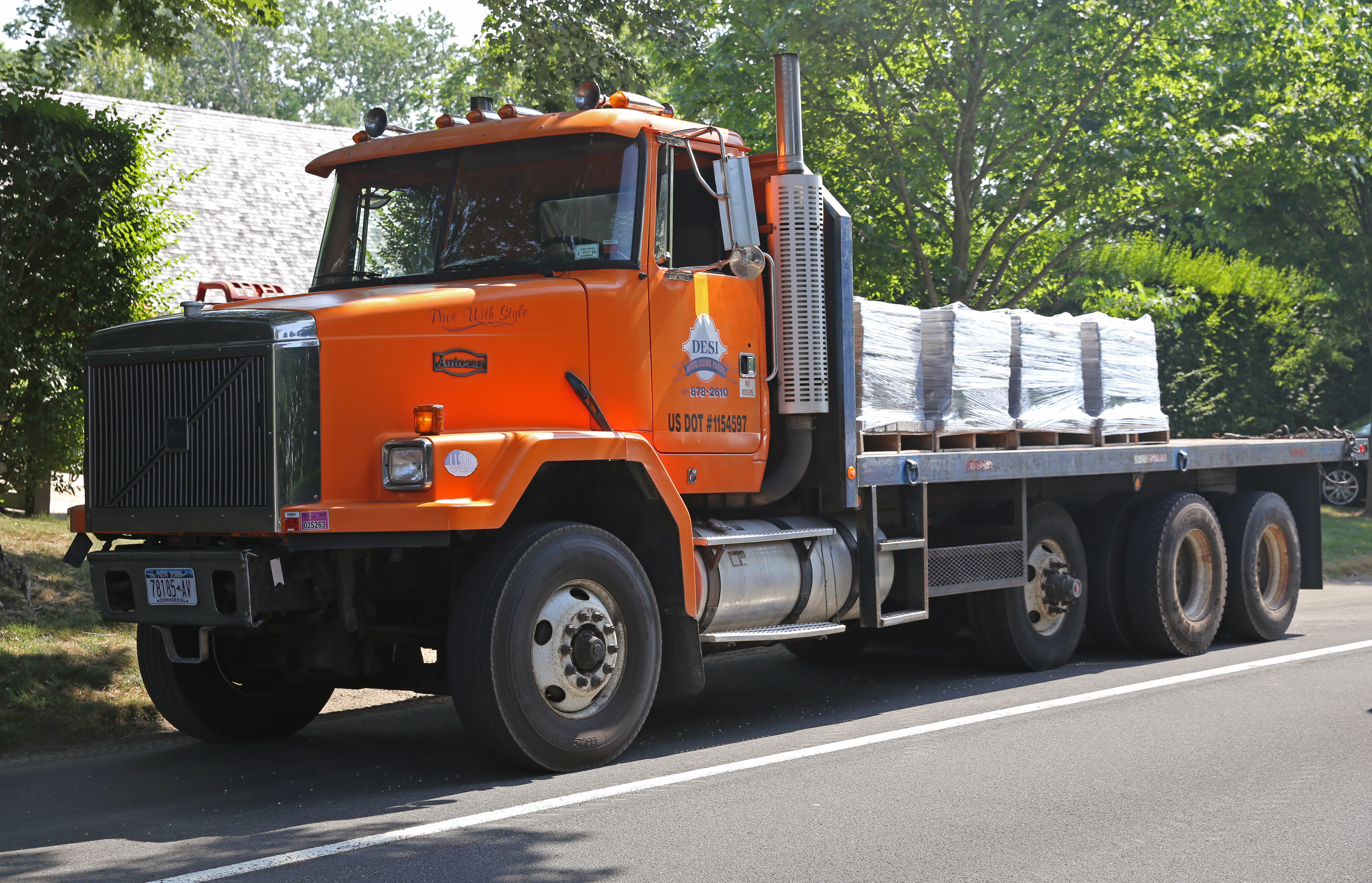
Autocar ACL flatbed
