= Canadian Corps Cyclist Battalion =

Unit of the WWI Canadian Expeditionary Force

Canadian Corps Cyclist Battalion Canadian Expeditionary Force
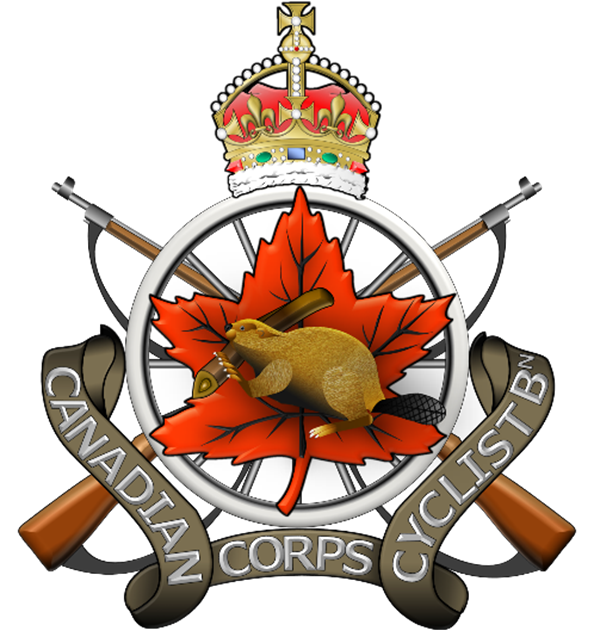
- Cap badge of the Canadian Corps Cyclist Battalion
- Active: 1 May 1916 to 15 November 1920
- Country: Canada
- Branch: C.E.F.
- Type: Cyclists / Mounted Troops
- Size: One Battalion (Three Companies)
- Part of: Canadian Corps
- Nickname: The Gas-Pipe Cavalry
- Engagements: 2nd Ypres; Vimy; Battle of Arras (1917); Amiens; Canada's Hundred Days
- Battle honours: None

Commanders
- Notable commanders: Major Albert Ernest Humprey, DSO

The Canadian Corps Cyclist Battalion was a unit of the First World War Canadian Expeditionary Force (CEF), serving in the Canadian Corps Mounted Troops from 1916 to 1920. The battalion saw active service in Belgium, and France as the Mounted Troops of the Canadian Corps. It also served within the Canadian Independent Force, seeing extensive combat during the final Hundred Days Offensive of the war.

== Independent companies ==
When Canada declared war on 4 August 1914, the Non-Permanent Active Militia (NPAM) mobilized at Camp Valcartier to build what would become the first Canadian contingent (later the 1st Canadian Division). At Valcartier it was identified that the NPAM did not contain a Cyclist Company; despite the fact that Cyclist Companies had been a standard component of the Mounted Troops of an infantry division in the British Army since 1908.

The NPAM mobilizing at Valcartier did include a corps which was surplus to the requirements of the Canadian Expeditionary Force: the Corps of Guides. The Guides were organized for employment as a domestic field intelligence and scouting force within Canada and were therefore not required in France and Belgium. The 1st Canadian Divisional Cyclist Company was therefore formed at Valcartier with most of its officers and many of the other ranks coming from the Corps of Guides. The use of the Guides officers to provide the leadership backbone of the 1st Canadian Divisional Cyclist Company was logical, as their duties were expected to be similar, with scouting and reconnaissance being key doctrinal tasks for both the Guides and the Cyclists. The birth of the 1st Canadian Divisional Cyclist Company at Valcartier started what became an enduring connection between the Guides and the Cyclists.

The 1st Canadian Divisional Cyclist Company sailed from Quebec City for the United Kingdom aboard SS Ruthenia on 29 September 1914, arriving in England on 15 October 1914. After a brief period on Salisbury Plain, the Company arrived in France on 10 February 1915. It was present at the Second Battle of Ypres, collocated with the headquarters of the 1st Canadian Division at the Chateau des Trois Tours (Chateau Brielen). The Cyclist Company was key to supporting the famed Canadian defensive action during the chlorine gas attack on Gravenstafel Ridge; its personnel worked almost without rest between 22 and 29 April to keep the divisional headquarters informed during a period of great uncertainty and risk for the Allies in the Ypres sector.

As the 2nd and 3rd Canadian Divisions formed in Canada, they too were organized to include the 2nd and 3rd Canadian Divisional Cyclist Companies within their Divisional Mounted Troops. The majority of 1915 and the first period of 1916 saw the 1st, 2nd and 3rd Canadian Divisional Cyclist companies operating independently, supporting their divisions in the field, largely performing line of communications duties. The 4th Canadian Divisional Cyclist Company which had only recently formed was broken-up in England with its personnel assigned to either the Canadian Reserve Cyclist Company or the battalion in the field.

== Cyclist depot system ==
In 1914 the Government of Canada recognized that there would be a requirement for a permanent Overseas Cyclist Depot in the United Kingdom for the duration of the war to establish a pool of trained replacements proximate to France and Flanders. The Canadian Reserve Cyclist Company was established as the Cyclist Depot in April 1915, and it moved between Shorncliffe, Hounslow, Chiseldon and finally Seaford.

Between 1914 and 1917 the Mounted Detachments of the Corps of Guides in Military Districts across Canada recruited and training new Cyclist recruits before Drafts were sent from Canada to the Cyclist Depot. In 1917 the CEF established a total of 10 Cyclist Depot Platoons across the majority of the Military Districts of Canada to recruit and train men for the Canadian Corps of Cyclists and take over this task from the Guides.

The Overseas Cyclist Depot ceased to exist in February 1919 when the Canadian Expeditionary Force began to return its personnel to Canada.

== Battalion formation and continued operations ==
In May 1916 the 1st, 2nd and 3rd Canadian Divisional Cyclist Companies amalgamated to form the Canadian Corps Cyclist Battalion in the field at Abele, Belgium. The previously independent Cyclist Companies were reorganized into a single battalion was to provide the newly formed Canadian Corps with corps-level Mounted Troops. 1, 2 and 3 Canadian Divisional Cyclist Companies became A, B and C Companies of the newly formed battalion. The original divisional identities of the three independent companies were reflected in the new triangular “battle patch” for the battalion, worn on shoulders, helmets and bicycles. The battalion's distinctive patch used the red of the 1st Canadian Division, dark blue of the 2nd Canadian Division and the French grey of the 3rd Canadian Division.

It was at Vimy Ridge alongside the remainder of the Canadian Corps when the Cyclists were given their first opportunity since the Second Battle of Ypres to fight in the manner for which they had been trained. In the lead-up to the attack on Vimy, most of the battalion were used to support tunneling operations in the vicinity of the ridge at locations like Neuville-Saint-Vaast.

On the morning of the 9th of April, elements of the battalion were employed in far forward positions, providing indirect machinegun fires in support of the assault. C Company were kept in reserve with the Canadian Light Horse at Mont-Saint-Éloi for the attack to go in and then exploit its success by penetrating weaknesses in the German lines, ultimately with the objective of seizing the town of Willerval. This was not to be for the Cyclists, as the heavy Allied artillery bombardment and poor weather conditions had made it so that the roads they were to take their bicycles down were effectively impassable.

After Vimy, the battalion returned to some of its earlier line of communications duties, but also began to re-orient its training towards mounted warfare as a formed body of Cyclists. In July 1918, Operation Michael the final German offensive of the war concluded. Although it resulted in territorial gains for the Germans, it came at the cost of exhausting their remaining reserves of men and materiel. This set the conditions for the period known as the Hundred Days Offensive which began with the Battle of Amiens (1918) and ended with the Armistice.

== The Hundred Days Offensive ==
During the final hundred days of the war, Brigadier-General Raymond Brutinel formed the Canadian Independent Force (CIF). The CIF was a highly mobile brigade-sized unit that was designed to exploit Allied battlefield successes. It was within this force that the Canadian Corps Cyclist Battalion was finally enabled to operate in the way it had been - conducting screening and reconnaissance tasks for the cavalry and infantry, often far in advance. The battalion was employed in this capacity until the end of hostilities and participated in the wide range of battles and actions which comprised the Hundred Days Offensive.

At the end of the war, the Cyclists participated in the march into and temporary occupation of the Rhineland. The battalion was afforded the honour of being the first Canadian unit to cross the Rhine River at Bonn on the famous Bonn Bridge (subsequently destroyed in the Second World War).

The battles that the 1st Divisional Cyclist Company and the Canadian Corps Cyclist Battalion fought in from the start of the war until its conclusion are as follows:

- Gravenstafel Ridge
- St Julien
- Ypres, 1915
- Vimy, 1917
- Arras, 1917
- The Hundred Days Offensive:
  - Amiens
  - Scarpe, 1918
  - Drocourt-Queant
  - Canal Du Nord
  - Cambrai, 1918
  - Arras, 1918
  - Hindenburg Line
  - Pursuit to Mons

== Disbandment of the battalion and the Canadian Corps of Cyclists ==
The Canadian Corps Cyclist Battalion was disbanded under General Order (GO) 208 effective 15 November 1920; in reality the battalion had ceased to exist in 1919 when the overwhelming majority of its personnel were demobilized. GO 208/20 simultaneously disbanded all other Cyclist Companies and Depot Platoons raised for Active Service with the CEF. Most Cyclists returned to their civilian lives, with many of them becoming prominent in the fields of academia and politics upon return to Canada.

The disbandment of the Cyclists units once again left Canada without Cyclists within the organization of either its Permanent Force or NPAM. This fact was highlighted by the Otter Commission and resulted in a series of GOs in 1920 which first converted the Mounted Detachments of the Corps of Guides into Cyclist Companies, and then further elaborated on their organization, training and equipment for employment as Cyclists in a future war. This process of evolving the Corps of Guides from Mounted Detachments into Cyclist Companies while retaining intelligence staff officer functions continued until the Corps of Guides were disbanded in 1929.

== War graves ==
Cyclists who were killed or died while serving abroad with the CEF are buried in 29 different cemeteries predominantly in Belgium and France but also in the United Kingdom.

== Battle honours ==
As Mounted Troops, the Cyclists were eligible for formal recognition for their service during the First World War through the award of battle honours in accordance with GOs 6 & 7 of 1928. Despite their eligibility, and for reasons that are unclear, the Cyclists were not initially recognized in the period between 1928 and 1934 when the majority of First World War battle honours were granted. Nevertheless, after a multi-year campaign, in 2026 the Government of Canada announced the award the following battle honours to the following Cyclist units of the CEF:

- 1st Canadian Division Cyclist Company: Gravenstafel; St. Julien; Ypres, 1915; France and Flanders, 1915 to 1916.
- 2nd Canadian Division Cyclist Company: France and Flanders, 1915 to 1916.
- 3rd Canadian Division Cyclist Company: France and Flanders, 1915 to 1916.
- 4th Canadian Division Cyclist Company: The Great War, 1916.
- the Canadian Corps Cyclist Battalion: Vimy, 1917; Arras, 1917; Amiens; Scarpe, 1918; Drocourt Quéant; Canal du Nord; Cambrai, 1918; Arras, 1918; Hindenburg Line; Pursuit to Mons; France and Flanders, 1916 to 1918.

== Post-War association and the last two cyclists ==
Following the reunion of the Canadian Corps in 1934 in Toronto, the survivors of the Cyclists established the Canadian Corps Cyclist Battalion Association. The association was very active throughout the subsequent fifty years, hosting annual dinners and routinely publishing an association magazine called The Cyclone. The association ceased its operations in 1987 due to the advanced age of its remaining members.

In 1937 the President of the association established a tontine using a bottle of Pol Roger champagne as the prize. The bottle was present at all subsequent association reunions until its suspension in 1987. When the association would meet, the bottle would be held aloft and those present would toast “To the last two Cyclists!”

In 1992, the last two Cyclists (Wilfred “Dick” Ellis and Billy Richardson, fittingly both former members of the Corps of Guides) met in Toronto at the apartment of Mr Ellis’ son to open the bottle. When they drank, they toasted “To the battalion!” The empty bottle and a bag of chalk from the Grange Tunnel at Vimy Ridge (dug in part by the Cyclists) was donated to the Canadian War Museum; both have been displayed during anniversaries associated with the First World War.

== Memorials ==
No formal memorial to the Canadian Corps Cyclist Battalion exists; however, cyclists of the Commonwealth are commemorated at The Cyclists War Memorial in Meriden, England. Members of the Canadian Intelligence Corps posted in the United Kingdom travel to Meriden annually to lay a wreath at The Cyclists Memorial in commemoration of the Canadian Corps of Cyclists.

== Perpetuation ==
The customs and traditions of the Canadian Corps Cyclist Battalion as well as the other units and sub-units of the Canadian Corps of Cyclists are perpetuated in the Canadian Army by the Canadian Intelligence Corps of the Intelligence Branch. The units of the Canadian Intelligence Corps conduct annual acts of remembrance associated with the Cyclists’ role in the Hundred Days Offensive.

== Cyclist Army Cadet Corps ==
From 1921 to 1926 an Army Cadet Corps existed, #945, "Winnipeg Cyclist Cadet Corps". It is likely the Corps was sponsored by No 10 Cyclist Company, Corps of Guides, which was based in Winnipeg, Manitoba at the time.

The Canadian Corps Cyclist Battalion Association sponsored a corps of the Royal Canadian Army Cadets, number 1888, in Toronto which was located at the St Lawrence Market Armouries. The Corps was only active for a short period 8 October 1942 until 28 August 1943) during the Second World War and the sponsorship eventually fell to that of the Royal Canadian Engineers.

== Published histories and memoirs ==
- Saga of the Cyclists in the Great War, 1914-1918. Editor: W. D. Ellis, Assistant Editor: J. Gordon Beatty. Toronto: 1965.
- The Cyclone (the circular journal of the Canadian Corps Cyclist Battalion Association). Toronto: 1937–1984.
- Scarlet to Green: A History of Intelligence in the Canadian Army, 1903-1963. Elliot, S. R. & Canadian Intelligence and Security Association. Toronto: Canadian Intelligence and Security Association. Altona, Manitoba: 2018.
- Riding into Battle: Canadian Cyclists in the Great War. Ted Glenn. Dundurn Press. 2018.

== Notable members ==
- William Ross Macdonald, Lieutenant-Governor of Ontario
- Colonel George Taylor Denison IV, son of George Taylor Denison III
- Major Thomas Laird Kennedy, Premier of Ontario
- Lieutenant Oliver Tiffany Macklem, Professor at the Royal Military College of Canada and grandfather of Tiff Macklem, Governor of the Bank of Canada
- Earle Parkhill Scarlett, Chancellor of the University of Alberta
- Major-General Alexander Charles Spencer, Adjutant-General of National Defence Headquarters and namesake of the Spencer Engineering Building at the University of Western Ontario
- Major William Duncan Herridge, PC, QC, MC, DSO, Canadian politician and diplomat.
- Lieutenant George Berry Bickle, played for the Toronto Argonauts and winner of the 1914 Grey Cup
- Group Captain Dr William Fielding Hanna, OC, CBE, AE, PhD, FRSC, plant scientist
- Air Commodore Geoffrey Stuart O’Brian, CBE, AFC, ED, leading figure in the inter-war Royal Canadian Air Force
