= Brutinel =

Brutinel is a surname. Notable people with the surname include:

- Raymond Brutinel (1882–1964), French officer and commander of the Canadian Automobile Machine Gun Brigade
- Robert M. Brutinel (born 1958), American judge
