= Armoured Autocar =

Armoured car used by Canadian Expeditionary Force

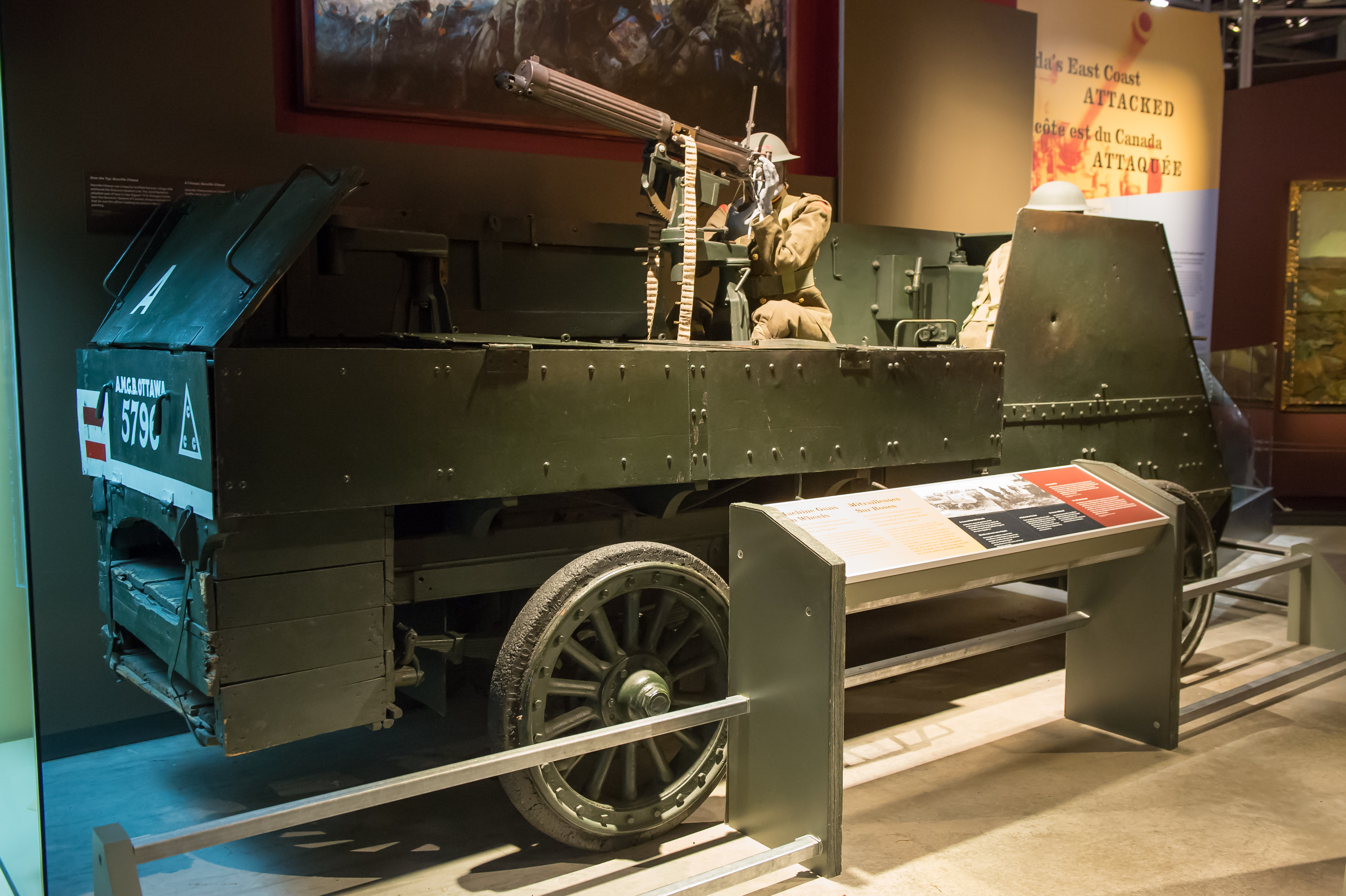
- The sole surviving Armoured Autocar at the Canadian War Museum
- Type: Armoured car
- Place of origin: Canada

Service history
- In service: 1914-1918
- Wars: World War I

Production history
- Designer: Raymond Brutinel
- Manufacturer: Chassis: Autocar; Armour: Bethlehem Steel; Weapons: Colt or Vickers
- Developed from: Autocar Type XXI

Specifications
- Mass: 6,000 lb (2,700 kg)
- Length: 4.10 m (13 ft 5 in)
- Width: 1.90 m (6 ft 3 in)
- Height: 1.90 m (6 ft 3 in)
- Crew: 8
- Armour: 5 mm front, 3 mm rear
- Main armament: 2 Colt or Vickers machine guns
- Secondary armament: 1 Lewis machine gun (optional)
- Engine: 22 hp (16 kW)
- Maximum speed: 40 km/h (25 mph)

The Armoured Autocar was a Canadian armoured car used as a mobile machine gun nest during the First World War.

== Development ==
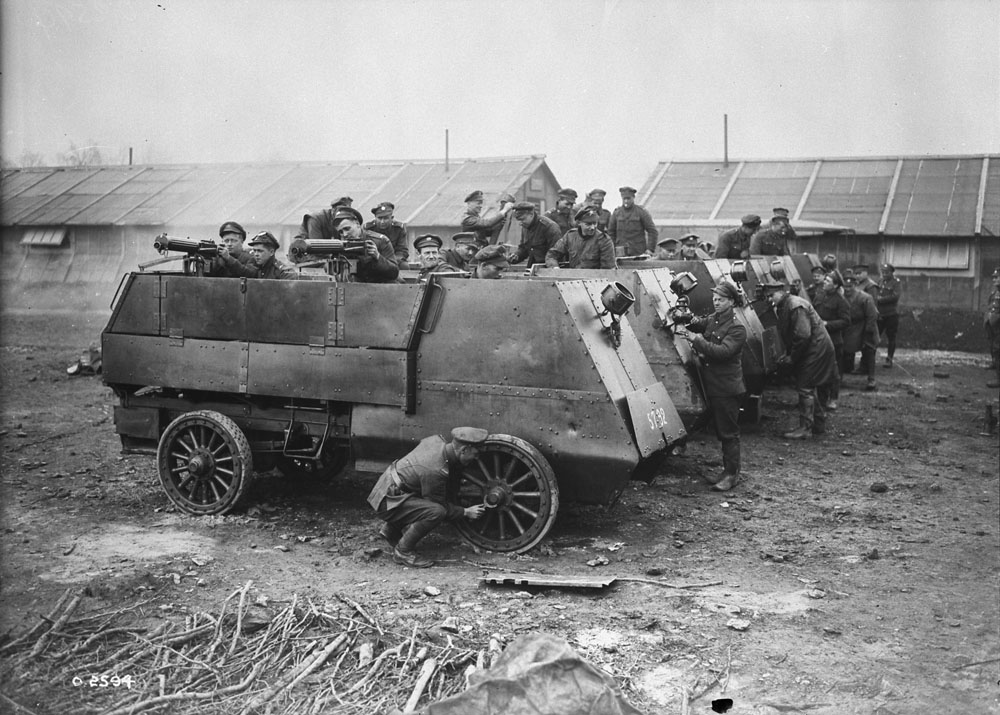
Members of the Canadian Automobile Machine Gun Brigade clean their Armoured Autocars

The Armoured Autocar was developed by Major Raymond Brutinel, who immigrated to Canada from France. Brutinel, a Captain in the French Army Reserve, became a self-made millionaire in Canada prior to the beginning of World War I. At the beginning of the war, he promoted an idea to combine machine guns and mechanical mobility. Brutinel assured the Minister of Militia that he could raise a mobile machine gun unit with private funds. Raising units with private funding was a standard practise of the time. As Vickers machine guns were unavailable at the time, Brutinel travelled to the Colt Company of Hartford, Connecticut and placed an order for 20 Colt machine guns. He then travelled to the Autocar Company of Ardmore, Pennsylvania to purchase Autocar UF21 truck chassis which had a reliable reputation, and which could support the weight of the armour. He then moved on to the Bethlehem Steel Company where he bought stocks of 9.5mm armour plate.

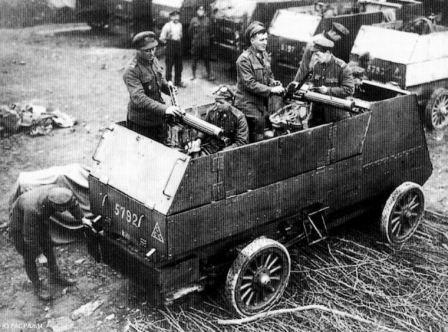
Another view of Armoured Autocars being cleaned

== Design ==
Returning to Canada, Brutinel directed the design of the armoured bodies that would be mounted on the Autocar UF21 chassis. The end result was an open topped armoured box with an angled front plate and drop sides. The machine guns were pedestal mounted, capable of firing over the sides of the vehicle, and also able to be dismounted for ground use. The Armoured Autocar weighed 3 tons, had a crew of 8 and had a maximum speed of 40 km/h (25 mph) on roads; its offroad capabilities were limited.

On 15 September 1914, the Canadian Automobile Machine Gun Brigade, C.E.F. was mobilized, comprising the 1st and 2nd Sifton Batteries. The Establishment called for a Major (Brutinel), 9 other officers and 124 other ranks. At the time of mobilization, the brigade was equipped with 8 Armoured Autocars, 20 machine guns, 8 trucks and 4 automobiles. Within the following year, a further 3 batteries named Eaton, Borden and Yukon, were raised with private funding which lead to the establishment of a second unit. The brigades moved overseas and while there was no mobile role for them in the static fighting of the time, they somehow managed to retain their armoured equipment.

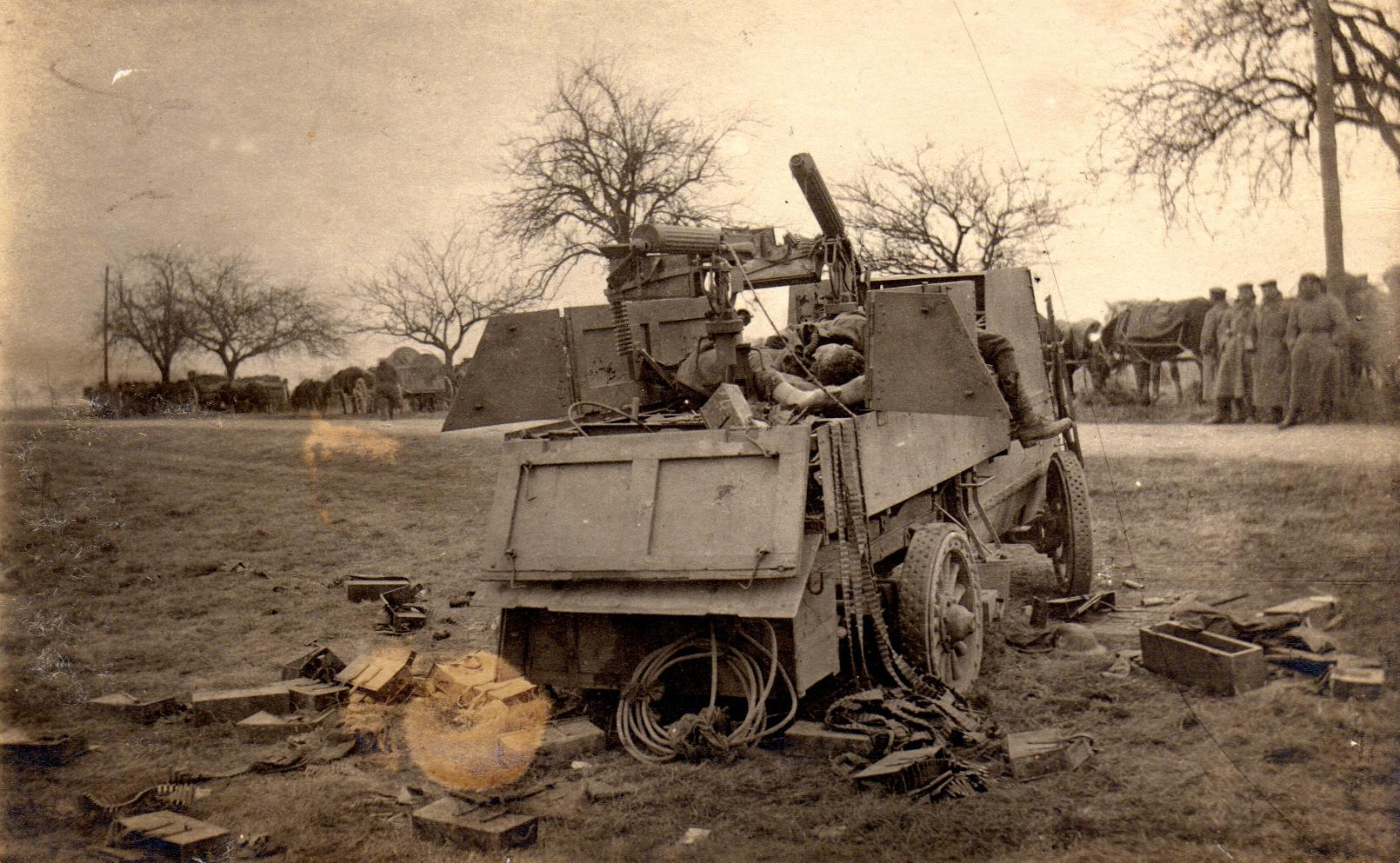
An Autocar destroyed on the Western Front

== Specification ==
On 16 May 1915, the units were redesignated 1st and 2nd Canadian Motor Machine Gun Brigades, C.E.F. Each consisted of A, B, C, D and E batteries. Each battery consisted of 8 Armoured Autocars and 12 specially designed light trucks. An individual Armoured Autocar carried 2 machine guns, 20,000 rounds of ammunition, extra gasoline and enough food for 14 NCOs and men. A Section was made up of 2 cars under the command of a Lieutenant, and a Battery consisted of 4 Sections under the command of a Captain. In addition to the armoured vehicles, each brigade also included a Section of motorcycles with 51 scouts who operated as signallers and dispatch riders.

The Armoured Autocars were to prove their worth in the German spring offensive in 1918. While Brutinel had envisioned the unit spearheading an advance through the enemy lines, they were to ultimately excel in the defensive role by utilizing their firepower and mobility. The open tops of the cars left their crews vulnerable.

Brutinel's Canadian Motor Machine Gun Brigades were the world's first specifically designed and equipped armoured units. That they ever saw the light of day was a direct result of the Minister of Militia of the day, Sam Hughes, who with all of his faults, was more open to the concept of mechanical mobility in combination with firepower than were the traditional army leaders of the period. It would be 20 years after the conclusion of World War I before the idea of armoured machine gun carriers would catch on with the British War Office.

The one surviving example of the Armoured Autocar is held by the Canadian War Museum in Ottawa, Ontario. The example is armed with Vickers machine guns.

== Replacement ==
A normal " Ground " Vickers Machine Gun crew consisted of 6 men.

# 1 was the gunner who also carried the tripod to the setup position.

# 2 was the belt feeder who carried the gun to the setup position.

#3 & 4 were in charge of the ammo boxes, cooling water and spare parts.

#5 was a scout and runner.

#6 was a range taker and spare body.

All men in the crew were trained in all positions and could strip and reassemble the weapon blindfolded.

The cramped size of the Canadian Motor Machine Gun Autocars only allowed 3 men each for the 2 Vickers, plus one driver and one officer, who had the option of using a Lewis Machine Gun mounted in front.

== Legacy ==
The Canadian Armoured Autocar is considered to have played a major role as an influence on later armoured car designs such as American Half-Tracks like the M2 half-track car, the M3 half-track and M5 half-track vehicles used by Allied Forces during the duration of the Second World War. German Forces also adopted the Sd.Kfz. 251, and the Soviets adopted the BA-30 in limited capacity alongside American half-tracks. Armoured cars of the first world war are what most consider to be the predecessors to modern day light tanks, reconnaissance vehicles and armoured vehicles/armoured troop transports.

== See also ==
- Military history of Canada during World War I
- Canadian Automobile Machine Gun Brigade
- Autocar Type XXI
