= Robert Arthur Brown Jr. =

Canadian oilman

- Born: 20 March 1914; Calgary, Alberta
- Died: 4 January 1972 (aged 57); Toronto, Ontario
- Resting place: Burnsland Cemetery
- Education: University School ('32); University of Alberta (BCom '36)
- Spouse: Genevieve Mary Sulpher (m. 1950)
- Military career
- Branch: Royal Canadian Navy Volunteer Reserve
- Service years: 1943–1946
- Rank: Lieutenant Commander
- Unit: Naval Staff
- Conflicts: World War II

Robert Arthur Brown Jr. (20 March 1914 – 4 January 1972) was a Canadian oilman who was active from the late 1930s to the early 1970s. In June 1936, his father discovered oil in Turner Valley and ushered in a new era in Alberta's petroleum industry. After the discovery, Brown worked alongside his father until the latter's death in 1948. In 1950, he acquired control of the Home Oil Company and in 1955 became the company's president. Through the 1950s and 1960s, Brown turned Home into one of Canada's most successful exploration and production companies. In 1969, Brown attempted to acquire control of Atlantic Richfield, and in the process amassed a personal debt of $26 million. The debt forced him to sell his share of Home, which prompted the intervention of the federal government prevent a foreign takeover. After he found a buyer in the Consumers' Gas Company, Brown stayed on as president of Home, but died shortly thereafter at age 57.

== Biography ==
Robert Arthur Brown Jr. was born in Calgary on 20 March 1914 to Robert Arthur Brown Sr. (1886–1948) and Christina McLaughlin (1887–1970). Brown was educated at University School in Victoria, British Columbia. He then attended the University of Alberta and studied commerce. Although he was on track to graduate in 1936, he business activities prevented him from obtaining his degree.

On 16 June 1936, Robert Arthur Brown Sr. and his partners, Max Bell and John W. Moyer, discovered crude oil in Turner Valley with their Royalties No. 1 well. The discovery began a new era in Turner Valley, which had been in production since the Dingman No. 1 well hit oil on 14 May 1914. At the time, it was the largest discovery of oil in Canadian history. Robert Jr. joined his father in the oil business and worked primarily to raise capital. The Brown group formed a new company for every well they drilled and, accordingly, paid royalties per individual well. At most, they group operated twelve companies.

In May 1943, Brown joined the navy and left Calgary. After completing his basic training at HMCS Cornwallis, he received a commission and was posted to naval headquarters in Ottawa. Brown continued to receive private income from his petroleum activities, and rather than live in barracks, took out a suite at the Château Laurier, where he lived for the duration of the war. Brown hosted regular parties in his suite, and hosted prominent members of society through contacts of his friend J. Ross Tolmie. In his post at naval headquarters, Brown worked on fuel supply.

After the war, Robert Jr. concluded that the oil industry in Alberta was done, and believe instead that he could make money importing consumer goods and electronics from the United States. Accordingly, he formed Northland Automatic Appliances and received capital from his father. The company was a failure, and in 1948, he returned to Calgary and rejoined his father in the oil business. By this time, most of the Brown interests had been consolidated into a company called Federated Petroleums, which in turn was controlled by the holding company United Oils. After Robert Sr. died on 17 May 1948, Robert Jr. assumed control of the family interests.

In 1950, Brown began purchasing share of Home Oil on the open market. By 1952 he had effective control of Home, and in 1955 merged the operations of Federated Petroleums into Home. In 1957, Home began purchasing shares of Trans-Canada Pipelines, and by 1960 had invested $38 million. The investment gave him a 14 per cent interest in the company, making him the largest shareholder. Home remained Trans-Canada's largest owner until Canadian Pacific Investments acquired a larger share in 1967.

In 1968, Atlantic Richfield made a major oil discovery on the Alaska North Slope. Brown and Home proceeded to acquire 450,000 acres of leases on the North Slope and drill two well, which cost the company $40 million. Home acquired also a two per cent stake in the Trans-Alaska Pipeline System. Brown spent $69 million to acquire 622,280 shares of Atlantic Richfield, 145,900 of which he acquired personally with $23 million loaned from the Canadian Imperial Bank of Commerce and the Bank of Nova Scotia. The remainder of the shares were owned by Home. By 1970, Atlantic Richfield shares had halved in price, while Home shares went from $80 in 1969 to $20 the following year. Given a deadline by the banks to repay his loan, Brown sought to find a buyer for his stake in Home. His most promising offer came from Ashland, though government ministers Joe Greene and Jack Austin pressured him not to sell to foreign interests. Brown found a Canadian buyer finally in the Consumers' Gas Company, a utility based in Toronto.

After selling his stake in Home to Consumers', Brown was allowed to stay on as company president. However, less than a year after the sale, he died at the Royal York Hotel in Toronto on 4 January 1972 at age 57.

Besides his involvement with Home, Brown also served as a director of Trans-Canada Pipe Lines, Crown Trust, Air Canada, and Canadian National Railway. Brown belonged to the Ranchmen's Club, Calgary Petroleum Club, and Calgary Golf and Country Club.

On 18 February 1950 at his mother's house in Calgary, Brown married Genevieve Mary Sulpher (1925–2007) of Pembroke, Ontario. Brown and Sulpher had met during the war when she was a secretary at naval headquarters in Ottawa. To his mother's dismay, Sulpher was a Catholic. The couple had three daughters: Pamela Mary, Lois Lorraine, and Carolyn Genevieve. In 1956, Brown purchased a large home at 2211 7 Street SW in Mount Royal where he would live for the remainder of his life.
