= Alwyn Bramley-Moore =

Canadian politician

Alywn Bramley-Moore

Member of the Legislative Assembly of Alberta
- In office March 22, 1909 – April 17, 1913
- Preceded by: New district
- Succeeded by: James Lowery
- Constituency: Alexandra

Personal details
- Born: July 3, 1878 Bloomsbury, London
- Died: April 4, 1916 (aged 37)
- Party: Liberal
- Occupation: author, military man and politician

Military service
- Allegiance: Canada
- Branch/service: Canadian Expeditionary Force
- Years of service: 1914-April 4, 1916
- Battles/wars: First World War

Alywn Bramley-Moore (July 3, 1878 – April 4, 1916) was a provincial politician, author and soldier from Alberta, Canada. He served as a Liberal member of the Legislative Assembly of Alberta from 1909 to 1913, as part of the governing Liberal caucus. After his political career he served in the Canadian Expeditionary Force in World War I from 1914 to his death in 1916.

== Early life ==
He was the son of the Rev. William Bramley-Moore, of 26 Russell Square, London, educated at Malvern College which he left in summer 1895. That year he emigrated to Canada, initially settling at Sarnia, Ontario. He homesteaded a farm near Lloydminster, Alberta, and had an interest in coal mine there. He moved to Edmonton in 1910.

Bramley-Moore met and married Ellen Nellie Grieve (1877–1950). They had three daughters — Laura, Dorothy and Gladys — and two sons — Alfred, the oldest child, and William, later a prominent Edmonton doctor. (William Bramley-Moore (1906–1976) is the namesake of an Edmonton park.)

== Political career ==
Bramley-Moore ran for a seat to the Legislative Assembly of Alberta in the 1909 Alberta general election as the Liberal candidate in the electoral district of Alexandra. He defeated the other candidate, future MLA James Lowery, in a landslide victory, taking 65 percent of the vote. He served only a single term in the provincial legislature, sitting in the back benches on the Government (Liberal) side of the Legislative Assembly.

In 1911, he wrote Canada and Her Colonies, or Home Rule for Alberta. This book sets forth a claim for the end of the protective tariff that is "designed to build up Canadian industries," mostly located in central Canada. He also called on the federal government to grant Alberta control of its natural resources and Crown lands (finally achieved in 1929). He described Alberta as a colony of the Phoenician type (that is, settled by emigrants of the home country) and not a colony of the Roman type (a conquered people). He states that just as in 1911 the Irish were accorded by many the right to Home Rule so should Alberta's right be recognized.

He though did not call for secession of the West (the territory west of a line drawn from Port Arthur (Thunder Bay) to the Hudsons Bay). He wrote "We are not urging the secession of the West from the East but we are endeavouring to show that such a result must ensue unless a change in her system of colonial government is made by Canada." He feared for the result if reforms were not made, saying "The laws of evolution are inexorable, and resistance will only result in a catastrophe." The 1911 Canadian election produced a win for the Conservatives who were strongly in support of Protectionism.

He retired from elected office at dissolution of the Assembly in 1913 and did not run for re-election

== Late life ==
After Bramley-Moore retired from provincial politics, he served on the Alberta Commission of the American Commission for the Study of Agricultural Credit. He and Henry Marshal Tory, president of the UofA, co-wrote a report on rural credit reform (to address the need for low-interest farm loans).

After the outbreak of World War I, he volunteered to join the Canadian army. He died in the war. Shot by a German sniper in March 1916, he died in hospital on April 4. Bramley-Moore was buried in the Boulogne Eastern Cemetery, Pas de Calais, France.

== Legacy ==
After his death a portrait of Moore was commissioned by Premier Arthur Lewis Sifton and was displayed in the legislature for many years.

His wartime letters home have been published in Path of Duty, edited by Ken Tingley.

Bramley-Moore has become a hero to later Alberta separatists for his many quotations and writings on exploitation of Alberta by eastern Canada, in reference to John A. MacDonald's National Policy of protecting Canadian manufacturers and workers.
