= Peter Enzenauer =

Canadian politician (1878-1951)

Peter J. Enzenauer
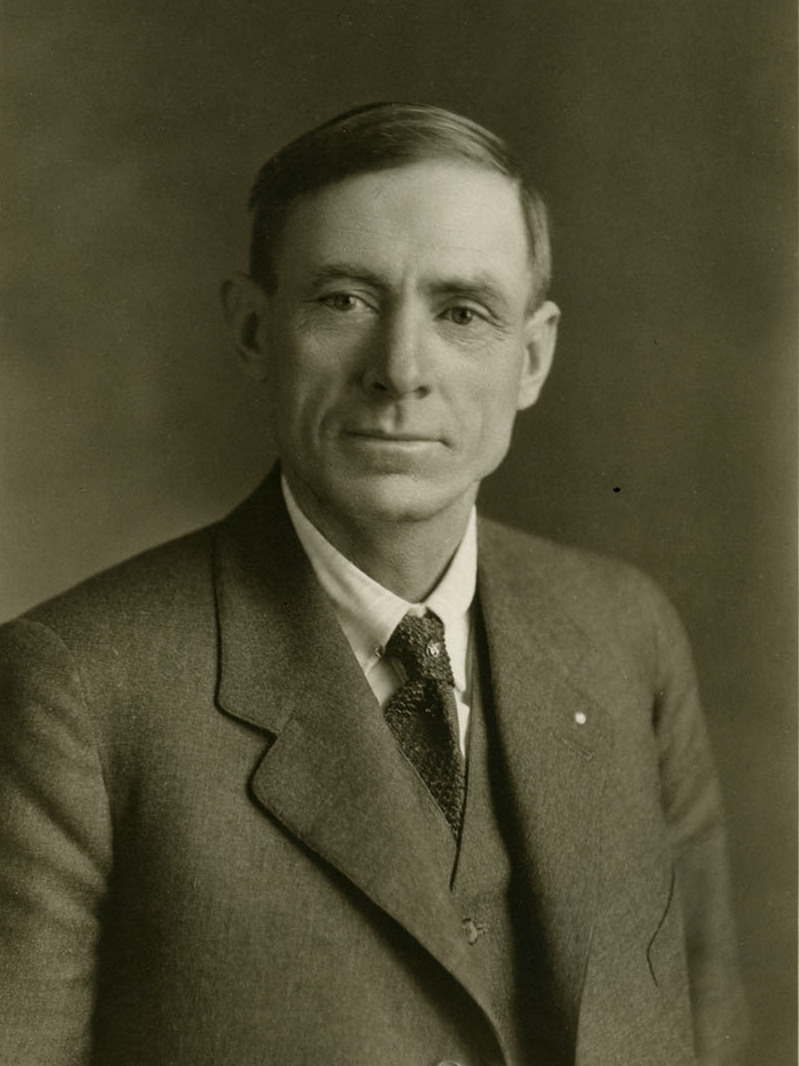

Member of the Legislative Assembly of Alberta
- In office July 18, 1921 – August 22, 1935
- Preceded by: James Lowery
- Succeeded by: Selmer Berg
- Constituency: Alexandra

Personal details
- Born: February 2, 1878 Red Bud, Illinois
- Died: April 11, 1951 (aged 73) Lloydminster, Alberta
- Party: United Farmers
- Occupation: politician

Peter John Enzenauer (February 2, 1878 – April 11, 1951) was a provincial politician from Alberta, Canada. He served as a member of the Legislative Assembly of Alberta from 1921 to 1935 sitting with the United Farmers caucus in government.

== Political career ==
Enzenauer ran for a seat to the Alberta Legislature for the first time in the 1921 Alberta general election as a candidate for the United Farmers. He won a two way race in the electoral district of Alexandra with over 88% of the popular vote.

Enzenauer ran for a second term in the 1926 Alberta general election. He fought a three way race to keep his seat. His margin of victory dropped but he still returned to office with a big majority.

Enzenauer faced a two battle running for his third term in office in the 1930 Alberta general election. His popular vote increased, and he won a big majority over Liberal candidate F.H. Dunstan.

Enzenauer ran for a fourth term in office in the 1935 Alberta general election but was defeated in a landslide by Social Credit candidate Selmer Berg. He finished a distant second in the five way race.
