= Home Oil Company =

Canadian petroleum company (1925–2002)

Home Oil Company Limited
- Industry: Petroleum
- Founded: 10 July 1925
- Founder: James R. Lowery
- Defunct: 30 September 2002
- Fate: Acquired by Anderson Exploration
- Headquarters: Home Oil Tower, 324 8 Ave SW, Calgary, Alberta

Home Oil Company Limited was a Canadian independent petroleum company that existed from 1925 and 1995. Home was founded to produce oil in the Turner Valley field, and by the end of World War II was the country's largest independent producer. Between 1952 and 1972, Home was controlled by Robert A. Brown Jr., who pursued an aggressive and high-risk strategy. From 1979 and 1991 Home Oil operated as a wholly owned subsidiary, first of the Consumers' Gas Company, then of Hiram Walker, and lastly of the Interprovincial Pipe Line Company. On 1 May 1991, Home Oil regained its independent status, which it retained for the duration of its existence. In 1995, Anderson Exploration acquired Home for C$879 million. After Devon Energy acquired Anderson in 2001, Home was finally struck off in September 2002.

== History ==
Home was founded in 1925 by James R. Lowery and was backed by a group of establishment businessmen from Vancouver. By 1952, Robert A. Brown, Jr had acquired control of home. He ran the company until 1971, when personal debt forced him to sell his stake. At that time the company was purchased by the Consumers' Gas Company Limited, based in Toronto. In 1980 Consumers' was acquired by Hiram Walker, which ran Home until 1986.

== Leadership ==
=== President ===
1. William Curtis Shelly, 1925–1931
2. Lt-Col Nelson Charles Spencer, 1931–1939
3. Robert Ker, 1939–1944
4. Maj James Robert Lowery, 1944–1951
5. Robert Brown Curran, 1951–1952
6. John Wray Moyer, 1952–1955
7. Robert Arthur Brown Jr., 1955–1972
8. Ross Ferguson Phillips, 1973–1979
9. Alexander M. McIntosh, 1979–1981
10. Richard Francis Haskayne, 1981–1991
11. David Evan Powell, 1991–1995

=== Chairman of the Board ===
1. Maj-Gen John William Stewart, 1925–1938
2. Lt-Col Nelson Charles Spencer, 1939–1951
3. Maj James Robert Lowery, 1951–1953
4. Robert Arthur Brown Jr., 1953–1955
5. John Wray Moyer, 1955–1968
6. Oakah L Jones, 1971–1973
7. Anthony George Scott Griffin, 1973–1979
8. Ross Ferguson Phillips, 1979
