= Alexandra (provincial electoral district) =

Defunct provincial electoral district in Alberta, Canada

Alberta electoral district

Defunct provincial electoral district
- Legislature: Legislative Assembly of Alberta
- District created: 1909
- District abolished: 1971
- First contested: 1909
- Last contested: 1967

Alexandra was a provincial electoral district in Alberta, Canada, mandated to return a single member to the Legislative Assembly of Alberta from 1909 to 1971. The district was named after Queen Alexandra, the wife of King Edward VII.

== History ==
The Alexandra electoral district was formed from the Vermilion electoral district prior to the 1909 Alberta general election. The Alexandra electoral district would be abolished and the Lloydminster electoral district would be formed in its place prior to the 1971 Alberta general election.

From 1924 to 1956, the district used instant-runoff voting to elect its MLA.

=== Members of the Legislative Assembly (MLAs) ===
Members of the Legislative Assembly for Alexandra
| Assembly | Years | Member | Party |
|---|---|---|---|
See Vermilion electoral district from 1905-1909
| 2nd | 1909–1913 | Alwyn Bramley-Moore | Liberal |
| 3rd | 1913–1917 | James R. Lowery | Conservative |
| 4th | 1917–1921 | James R. Lowery | Conservative |
| 5th | 1921–1926 | Peter J. Enzenauer | United Farmers |
| 6th | 1926–1930 | Peter J. Enzenauer | United Farmers |
| 7th | 1930–1935 | Peter J. Enzenauer | United Farmers |
| 8th | 1935–1940 | Selmer A. Berg | Social Credit |
| 9th | 1940–1944 | Selmer A. Berg | Social Credit |
| 10th | 1944–1948 | Selmer A. Berg | Social Credit |
| 11th | 1948–1952 | Andres O. Aalborg | Social Credit |
| 12th | 1952–1955 | Andres O. Aalborg | Social Credit |
| 13th | 1955–1959 | Andres O. Aalborg | Social Credit |
| 14th | 1959–1963 | Andres O. Aalborg | Social Credit |
| 15th | 1963–1967 | Andres O. Aalborg | Social Credit |
| 16th | 1967–1971 | Andres O. Aalborg | Social Credit |
See Lloydminster electoral district from 1971-1993

== Election results ==
=== 1909 ===
1909 Alberta general election
| Party | Candidate | Votes | % | ±% |
|---|---|---|---|---|
| Liberal | Alwyn Bramley-Moore | 771 | 64.63% | – |
| Conservative | James R. Lowery | 422 | 35.37% | – |
| Total | | 1,193 | – | – |
| Rejected, spoiled and declined | | N/A | – | – |
| Eligible electors / turnout | | 1,555 | N/A | – |
| Liberal pickup new district. | | | | |
Source(s) Source: "Alexandra Official Results 1909 Alberta general election". Alberta Heritage Community Foundation.

=== 1913 ===
1913 Alberta general election
| Party | Candidate | Votes | % |
|---|---|---|---|
| Conservative | James R. Lowery | 478 | 41.39% |
| Liberal | N. C. Lyster | 470 | 40.69% |
| Independent | W. H. Anderson | 207 | 17.92% |
| Total | | 1,155 | – |
Source(s) Source: "Alexandra Official Results 1913 Alberta general election". Alberta Heritage Community Foundation.

=== 1917 ===
1917 Alberta general election
| Party | Candidate | Votes | % | ±% |
|---|---|---|---|---|
| Conservative | James R. Lowery | Acclaimed | – | – |
| Total | | N/A | – | – |
| Rejected, spoiled and declined | | N/A | – | – |
| Eligible electors / turnout | | N/A | N/A | – |
| Conservative hold | | Swing | | N/A |
Source(s) Source: "Alexandra Official Results 1917 Alberta general election". Alberta Heritage Community Foundation. One of eleven Members of the Legislative Assembly of Alberta acclaimed under The Elections Act Section 38, which stipulated that any member of the 3rd Alberta Legislative Assembly would be guaranteed re-election, with no contest held, if the member joined for wartime service in the First World War. An Act amending The Election Act respecting Members of the Legislative Assembly on Active Service., SA 1917, c. 38

=== 1921 ===
1921 Alberta general election
| Party | Candidate | Votes | % | ±% |
|---|---|---|---|---|
| United Farmers | Peter J. Enzenauer | 2,195 | 88.62% | – |
| Liberal | Theodore H. Currie | 282 | 11.38% | – |
| Total | | 2,477 | – | – |
| Rejected, spoiled and declined | | N/A | – | – |
| Eligible electors / turnout | | 3,381 | 73.26% | – |
| United Farmers gain from Conservative | | Swing | | N/A |
Source(s) Source: "Alexandra Official Results 1921 Alberta general election". Alberta Heritage Community Foundation.

=== 1926 ===
1926 Alberta general election
| Party | Candidate | Votes | % | ±% |
|---|---|---|---|---|
| United Farmers | Peter J. Enzenauer | 1,653 | 71.04% | -17.58% |
| Conservative | I. F. Crossley | 421 | 18.09% | – |
| Liberal | M. Alsager | 253 | 10.87% | -0.51% |
| Total | | 2,327 | – | – |
| Rejected, spoiled and declined | | 169 | – | – |
| Eligible electors / turnout | | 3,781 | 66.01% | -7.25% |
| United Farmers hold | | Swing | | -12.14% |
Source(s) Source: "Alexandra Official Results 1926 Alberta general election". Alberta Heritage Community Foundation.

=== 1930 ===
1930 Alberta general election
| Party | Candidate | Votes | % | ±% |
|---|---|---|---|---|
| United Farmers | Peter J. Enzenauer | 1,725 | 72.66% | 1.63% |
| Liberal | F. H. Dunstan | 649 | 27.34% | 16.47% |
| Total | | 2,374 | – | – |
| Rejected, spoiled and declined | | 140 | – | – |
| Eligible electors / turnout | | 4,635 | 54.24% | -11.77% |
| United Farmers hold | | Swing | | -3.81% |
Source(s) Source: "Alexandra Official Results 1930 Alberta general election". Alberta Heritage Community Foundation.

=== 1935 ===
1935 Alberta general election
| Party | Candidate | Votes | % | ±% |
|---|---|---|---|---|
| Social Credit | Selmer A. Berg | 2,479 | 56.82% | – |
| United Farmers | Peter J. Enzenauer | 924 | 21.18% | -51.48% |
| Liberal | Norman McClellan | 561 | 12.86% | -14.48% |
| Conservative | T. B. MacKay | 202 | 4.63% | – |
| Communist | C. W. Springford | 197 | 4.52% | – |
| Total | | 4,363 | – | – |
| Rejected, spoiled and declined | | 181 | – | – |
| Eligible electors / turnout | | 5,800 | 78.34% | 24.11% |
| Social Credit gain from United Farmers | | Swing | | -4.84% |
Source(s) Source: "Alexandra Official Results 1935 Alberta general election". Alberta Heritage Community Foundation.

=== 1940 ===
1940 Alberta general election
| Party | Candidate | Votes | % | ±% |
|---|---|---|---|---|
First count
| Social Credit | Selmer A. Berg | 2,215 | 46.70% | -10.12% |
| Co-operative Commonwealth | C. Cairns | 1,273 | 26.84% | – |
| Independent | A. E. Peterson | 1,255 | 13.91% | – |
| Total | | 4,743 | – | – |
Ballot transfer results
| Social Credit | Selmer A. Berg | 2,326 | 54.36% | – |
| Co-operative Commonwealth | C. Cairns | 1,953 | 45.64% | – |
| Total | | 4,279 | – | – |
| Rejected, spoiled and declined | | 208 | – | – |
| Eligible electors / turnout | | 6,774 | 73.09% | 18.25% |
| Social Credit hold | | Swing | | N/A |
Source(s) Source: "Alexandra Official Results 1940 Alberta general election". Alberta Heritage Community Foundation.

=== 1944 ===
1944 Alberta general election
| Party | Candidate | Votes | % | ±% |
|---|---|---|---|---|
| Social Credit | Selmer A. Berg | 2,212 | 57.20% | 10.50% |
| Co-operative Commonwealth | Gordon I. Clark | 1,504 | 38.89% | 12.05% |
| Labor–Progressive | C. W. Springford | 151 | 3.90% | – |
| Total | | 3,867 | – | – |
| Rejected, spoiled and declined | | 82 | – | – |
| Eligible electors / turnout | | 5,994 | 65.88% | -7.21% |
| Social Credit hold | | Swing | | N/A |
Source(s) Source: "Alexandra Official Results 1944 Alberta general election". Alberta Heritage Community Foundation.

=== 1948 ===
1948 Alberta general election
| Party | Candidate | Votes | % | ±% |
|---|---|---|---|---|
| Social Credit | Andres O. Aalborg | 2,034 | 52.49% | -4.71% |
| Co-operative Commonwealth | George Henry Davies | 1,190 | 30.71% | -8.18% |
| Liberal | James Edgar Miller | 651 | 16.80% | – |
| Total | | 3,875 | – | – |
| Rejected, spoiled and declined | | 281 | – | – |
| Eligible electors / turnout | | 7,205 | 57.68% | -8.20% |
| Social Credit hold | | Swing | | 1.74% |
Source(s) Source: "Alexandra Official Results 1948 Alberta general election". Alberta Heritage Community Foundation.

=== 1952 ===
1952 Alberta general election
| Party | Candidate | Votes | % | ±% |
|---|---|---|---|---|
| Social Credit | Andres O. Aalborg | 2,412 | 69.25% | 16.76% |
| Co-operative Commonwealth | James Magill | 1,071 | 30.75% | 0.04% |
| Total | | 3,483 | – | – |
| Rejected, spoiled and declined | | 250 | – | – |
| Eligible electors / turnout | | 6,410 | 58.24% | 0.55% |
| Social Credit hold | | Swing | | 8.36% |
Source(s) Source: "Alexandra Official Results 1952 Alberta general election". Alberta Heritage Community Foundation.

=== 1955 ===
1955 Alberta general election
| Party | Candidate | Votes | % | ±% |
|---|---|---|---|---|
| Social Credit | Andres O. Aalborg | 2,143 | 50.38% | -18.87% |
| Liberal | Russell Robertson | 1,420 | 33.38% | – |
| Co-operative Commonwealth | Mrs. Lois Karlsson | 590 | 13.87% | -16.88% |
| Conservative | Alan Ronaghan | 101 | 2.37% | – |
| Total | | 4,254 | – | – |
| Rejected, spoiled and declined | | 259 | – | – |
| Eligible electors / turnout | | 6,696 | 67.40% | 9.16% |
| Social Credit hold | | Swing | | -10.75% |
Source(s) Source: "Alexandra Official Results 1955 Alberta general election". Alberta Heritage Community Foundation.

=== 1959 ===
1959 Alberta general election
| Party | Candidate | Votes | % | ±% |
|---|---|---|---|---|
| Social Credit | Andres O. Aalborg | 2,354 | 59.44% | 9.07% |
| Progressive Conservative | Dr. A. H. Sweet | 1,248 | 31.52% | – |
| Liberal | Hilda A. Cross | 358 | 9.04% | -24.34% |
| Total | | 3,960 | – | – |
| Rejected, spoiled and declined | | 11 | – | – |
| Eligible electors / turnout | | 6,240 | 63.64% | -3.76% |
| Social Credit hold | | Swing | | 5.47% |
Source(s) Source: "Alexandra Official Results 1959 Alberta general election". Alberta Heritage Community Foundation.

=== 1963 ===
1963 Alberta general election
| Party | Candidate | Votes | % | ±% |
|---|---|---|---|---|
| Social Credit | Andres O. Aalborg | 3,284 | 66.38% | 6.94% |
| Conservative-Liberal | W. Slim Thorpe | 1,134 | 22.92% | – |
| New Democratic | John C. Sandercock | 529 | 10.69% | – |
| Total | | 4,947 | – | – |
| Rejected, spoiled and declined | | 6 | – | – |
| Eligible electors / turnout | | 8,305 | 59.64% | -4.00% |
| Social Credit hold | | Swing | | 7.77% |
Source(s) Source: "Alexandra Official Results 1963 Alberta general election". Alberta Heritage Community Foundation.

=== 1967 ===
1967 Alberta general election
| Party | Candidate | Votes | % | ±% |
|---|---|---|---|---|
| Social Credit | Andres O. Aalborg | 2,880 | 58.08% | -8.31% |
| Progressive Conservative | Kenneth E. Oates | 940 | 18.96% | – |
| New Democratic | Lester A. Lindgren | 835 | 16.84% | 6.14% |
| Liberal | Charles F. Swan | 304 | 6.13% | – |
| Total | | 4,959 | – | – |
| Rejected, spoiled and declined | | 19 | – | – |
| Eligible electors / turnout | | 7,839 | 63.50% | 3.86% |
| Social Credit hold | | Swing | | -2.17% |
Source(s) Source: "Alexandra Official Results 1967 Alberta general election". Alberta Heritage Community Foundation.

== Plebiscite results ==
=== 1957 liquor plebiscite ===
1957 Alberta liquor plebiscite results: Alexandra
Question A: Do you approve additional types of outlets for the sale of beer, wine and spirituous liquor subject to a local vote?
| Ballot choice | Votes | % |
| No | 1,083 | 54.40% |
| Yes | 908 | 46.60% |
| Total votes | 1,991 | 100% |
| Rejected, spoiled and declined | 20 | |
5,963 eligible electors, turnout 33.73%

On October 30, 1957, a stand-alone plebiscite was held province wide in all 50 of the then current provincial electoral districts in Alberta. The government decided to consult Alberta voters to decide on liquor sales and mixed drinking after a divisive debate in the Legislature. The plebiscite was intended to deal with the growing demand for reforming antiquated liquor control laws.

The plebiscite was conducted in two parts. Question, A asked in all districts, asked the voters if the sale of liquor should be expanded in Alberta, while Question B, asked in a handful of districts within the corporate limits of Calgary and Edmonton, asked if men and women should be allowed to drink together in establishments.

Province wide Question A of the plebiscite passed in 33 of the 50 districts while Question B passed in all five districts. Alexandra was divided on the issue, but voted against it. The district recorded an extremely low voter turnout, well below the province wide average of 46%.

Official district returns were released to the public on December 31, 1957. The Social Credit government in power at the time did not consider the results binding. However the results of the vote led the government to repeal all existing liquor legislation and introduce an entirely new Liquor Act.

Municipal districts lying inside electoral districts that voted against the plebiscite such as Alexandra were designated Local Option Zones by the Alberta Liquor Control Board and considered effective dry zones. Business owners who wanted a licence had to petition for a binding municipal plebiscite in order to be granted a licence.

== See also ==
- List of Alberta provincial electoral districts
- Canadian provincial electoral districts
- Royal eponyms in Canada
