= Selmer Berg =

Canadian politician

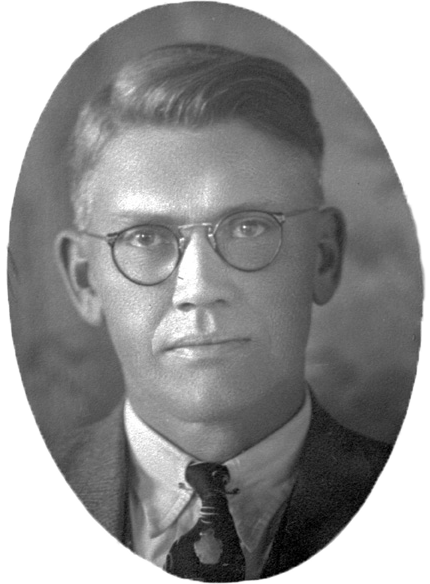

Member of the Legislative Assembly of Alberta
- In office 1935–1948
- Preceded by: Peter Enzenauer
- Succeeded by: Anders Aalborg
- Constituency: Alexandra

Personal details
- Born: August 7, 1886 Minneapolis, Minnesota, United States
- Died: September 17, 1966 (aged 80) Marwayne, Alberta, Canada
- Party: Social Credit

Selmer Allan Berg (August 7, 1886 – September 17, 1966) was a Canadian provincial politician from Alberta. He served as a member of the Legislative Assembly of Alberta from 1935 to 1948, sitting with the Social Credit caucus in government. He was the son of Norwegian immigrants.

== Early life ==
Selmer Allan Berg was born August 7, 1886, at Minneapolis, Minnesota to Knut E. Berg and Serine Solhaug, both of Norwegian descent. Berg was educated in Willmar, Minnesota and moved to Canada in 1915. He married the daughter of Robert Imrie on December 24, 1917, and together had seven children. He was the owner of the general stores of Marwayne and New Norway, Alberta.

== Political career ==
Berg was first elected as a Social Credit member in the 1935 Alberta general election to Alexandra electoral district, defeating incumbent United Farmers of Alberta candidate Peter J. Enzenauer. Berg was subsequently re-elected in the 1940 and 1944 Alberta general elections.
