= Brown-Lowery Provincial Park =

Provincial park in Alberta, Canada

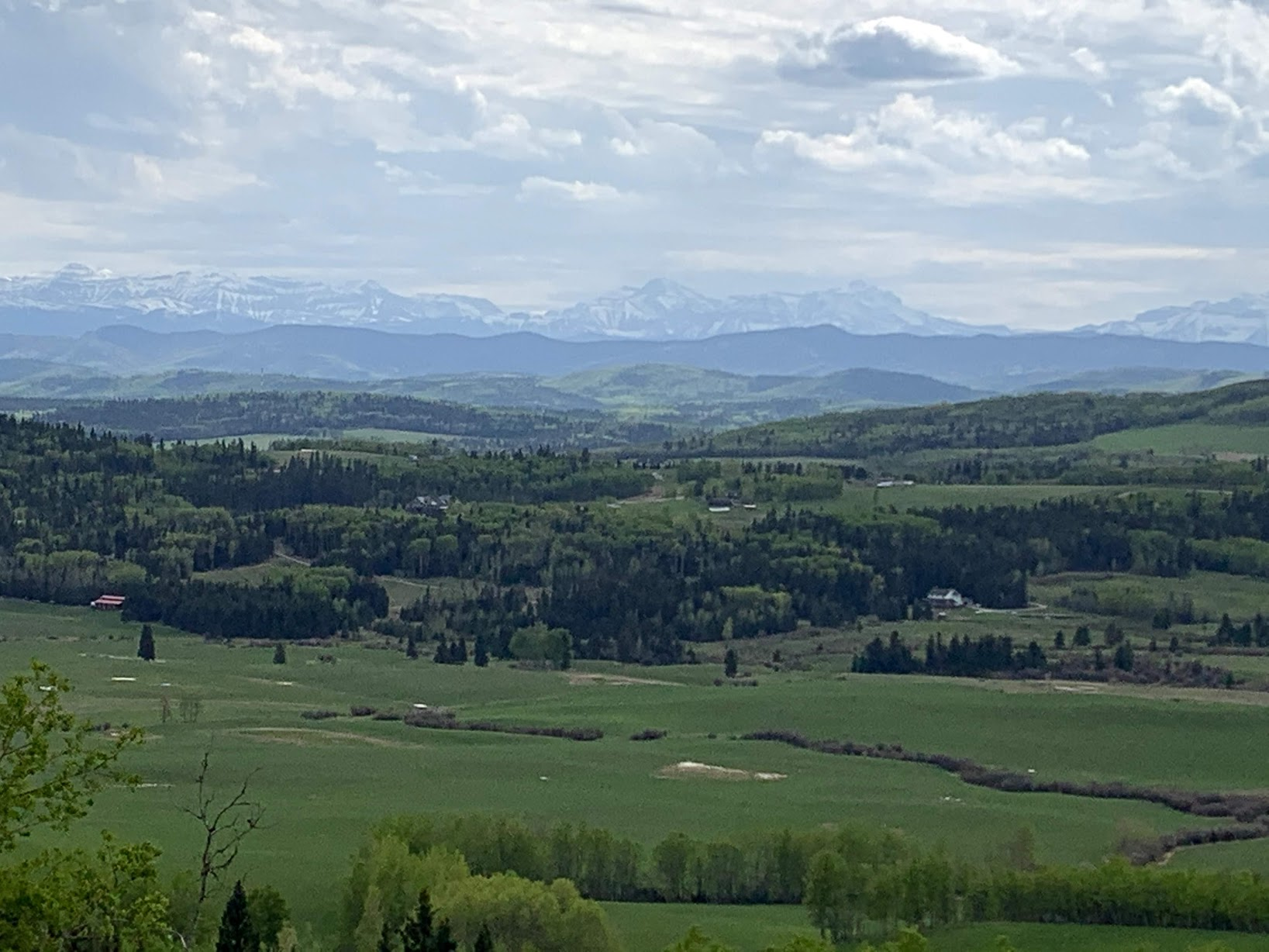
- Brown-Lowery Provincial Park in May 2020

- Location within Alberta
- Interactive map of Brown-Lowery Provincial Park
- Location: County of Foothills Foothills No. 31, Alberta
- Nearest city: Turner Valley
- Coordinates: 50°48′50″N 114°25′50″W
- Area: 3 km^{2} (1.2 sq mi)
- Established: October 29, 1992
- Named for: Robert Brown Sr.; James R. Lowery
- Governing body: Alberta Forests and Parks

Brown-Lowery Provincial Park is a provincial park in Alberta, Canada. It is located 27 kilometres (17 mi) northwest of Turner Valley and 49 kilometres (30 mi) southwest of Calgary. It is situated east from Alberta's Rocky Mountains.

Brown-Lowery has an area of 3 km^{2} (1.2 sq mi) and is situated at an elevation of 1,370 m (4,490 ft). It was established on October 29, 1992, and is maintained by Alberta Forestry and Parks.

According to the plaque located at the park entrance: "This natural landscape was donated to the people of Alberta in 1969, by Home Oil Company Limited in memory of its founders Robert Brown Sr. and Major James Robert Lowery. Both men were pioneers of Alberta's oil industry and took part in the early development of the Turner Valley oil field.

Robert Brown Sr., who has been called the father of the Alberta oil industry, had numerous successes in the Turner Valley Field dating back to 1914. He amalgamated his many interests into Federated Petroleum in 1940. Major Lowery founded Home Oil on July 10, 192? and completed his first successful well, Home Oil No. 1, in 1928. The two companies were merged in 1951 to form Home Oil Company Limited, which to this day continues to be actively involved in the Turner Valley area."

== Activities ==
Front country hiking and wildlife viewing are popular activities in this provincial park.

== See also ==
- List of provincial parks in Alberta
- List of Canadian provincial parks
- List of National Parks of Canada
