= James R. Lowery =

Canadian politician (1884–1956)

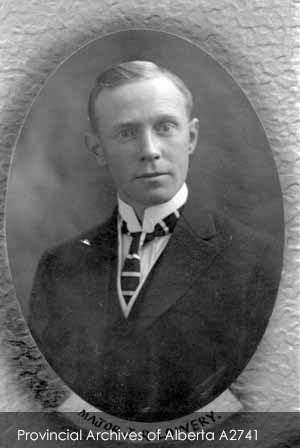

Member of the Legislative Assembly of Alberta
- In office July 30, 1913 – July 18, 1921
- Preceded by: Alwyn Bramley-Moore
- Succeeded by: Peter Enzenauer
- Constituency: Alexandra

Personal details
- Born: James Robert Lowery; April 12, 1884 Hastings, Ontario
- Died: December 8, 1956 (aged 72) Vancouver, British Columbia
- Party: Conservative
- Spouse: Ethel Bell Whyte (m. 1912)
- Children: two
- Education: University of Alberta
- Occupation: Businessman; military man; politician

Military service
- Allegiance: Canada
- Branch/service: Royal Canadian Army
- Rank: Major
- Unit: 49th Battalion
- Battles/wars: First World War

James Robert Lowery (April 12, 1884 – December 8, 1956) was a Canadian oilman, politician and military officer from Alberta. He served as a member of the Legislative Assembly of Alberta from 1913 to 1921 sitting with the Conservative caucus in opposition, and later became a partner in the Home Oil Company.

== Early life ==
James Robert Lowery was born April 12, 1884, near Hastings, Ontario, the third of ten children to John Boyd Lowery and Rachel Whitton. James' father was a farmer and cheese-maker and served as a government cheese inspector in the Village of Frankford in Ontario. After attending high school, Lowery secured a teaching job in North Hastings, despite having to repeat one year of math while in school. Lowery moved to Edmonton, Alberta in 1905 where he secured a job as circulation manager for the Edmonton Journal, eventually quitting to join John Michaels (of Mike's News Stand) with a contract to distribute the Journal. Lowery later opened a grocery store, and later bought a homestead near Kitscoty. Lowery married Ethel Bell Whyte on June 13, 1912, and together had two children.

Lowery attributed his defeat in the 1909 election to his opponent being a "college man", and Lowery decided to continue his education. In May 1910 he qualified for university by passing the matriculation exam at the University of Toronto, and then attended Queen's University, but returned to Edmonton after a single year. Later Lowery attended the University of Alberta completing a Bachelor of Arts, and passed the bar examination in 1923.

== Political career ==
Lowery first attempted to enter provincial politics by running in the 1909 Alberta general election as a Conservative candidate in the Alexandra electoral district. He lost the election to Liberal candidate Alwyn Bramley-Moore in a landslide.

Lowery was elected on his second attempt to the Alberta Legislature in the 1913 Alberta general election. He defeated Liberal candidate N.C. Lyster and another candidate by an eight-vote plurality to pick up the district for his party. His election was not without controversy as Lowery claimed to live in a number of communities including Oxville, Kitscoty and Lloydminster, and newspaper political cartoons and articles criticizing him as an "Edmonton town-lotter". Lowery eventually settled in Lloydminster and formed a general business partnership with Murray Miller.

Lowery went overseas to fight in World War I at the same time keeping his seat in the legislature. He was acclaimed under section 38 of the Elections Act afforded to sitting members who were involved in active military service and returned to his district in the 1917 Alberta general election. Lowery was commissioned as a captain in the 151st Battalion in November 1915, and shipped to England the next year. Lowery took a demotion to lieutenant to serve with the 49th Battalion in France and was wounded in the knee during the Battle of Vimy Ridge in 1917, and shot in the hand as he was carried off in a stretcher. Lowery was discharged and returned home a major in March 1918.

Lowery served the rest of his second term after the war and retired at dissolution in 1921.

== Founding the Home Oil Company ==
After his political career, Lowery focused on business activities in Lloydminster in real estate, and becoming president of the local Board of Trade. Lowery moved back to Edmonton to work as the Alberta agent for the Mutual Life Insurance Company of New York.

Lowery successfully drilled Royalite No. 4, a well in Turner Valley in 1924 in partnership with Imperial Oil, striking crude oil. Nine months later in 1925, Lowery formed Home Oil Company Limited in partnership with other investors. Home Oil became the largest independent company in Canada by 1945. Lowery served as the President, and later board chairman of Home Oil, and officially retired from the Board in 1953.

== Later life ==
Lowery moved to Vancouver, where he died December 8, 1956, at the age of 72.

== Honours ==
The Brown-Lowery Provincial Park near Turner Valley, Alberta was named in honour of Home Oil Company Limited founders Robert Brown Sr. and Major James Robert Lowery in 1992, after the land was donated by the company to the Government of Alberta in 1969.
