= Château Laurier =

Hotel in Ottawa, Canada

Fairmont Château Laurier
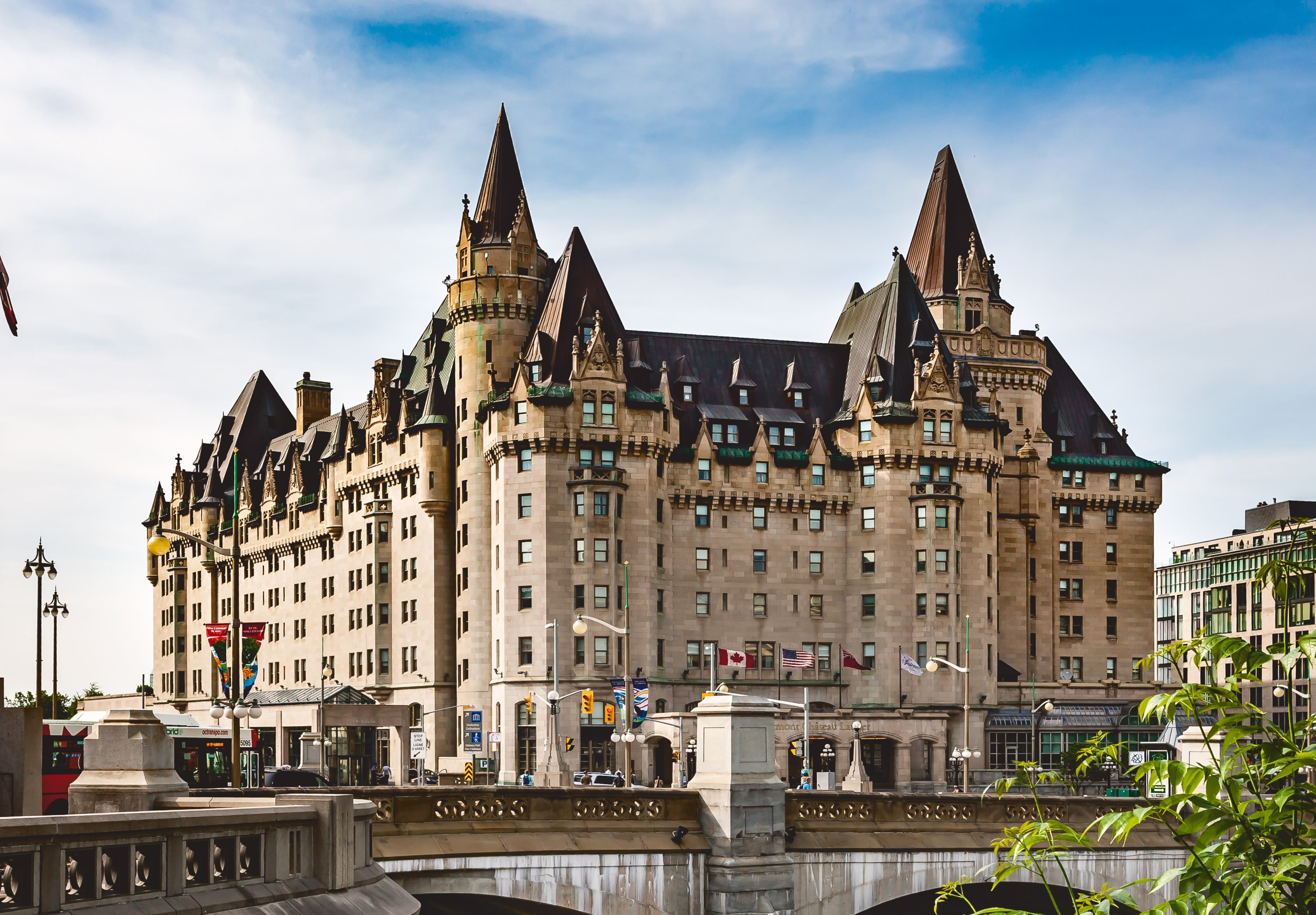
- Château Laurier, 2010

General information
- Location: 1 Rideau Street; Ottawa, Ontario; K1N 8S7
- Coordinates: 45°25′32.04″N 75°41′42.39″W
- Opening: June 12, 1912
- Owner: Capital Hotel L.P.
- Operator: Fairmont Hotels and Resorts

Design and construction
- Architects: Bradford Gilbert, Ross and Macfarlane

Other information
- Number of rooms: 429

Website
- www.fairmont.com/laurier-ottawa/

National Historic Site of Canada
- Official name: Château Laurier National Historic Site of Canada
- Designated: 1981

The Fairmont Château Laurier is a 660,000-square-foot (61,000 m^{2}) hotel with 429 guest rooms in the downtown core of Ottawa, Ontario, Canada. Located near the intersection of Rideau Street and Sussex Drive, it is designed in a French Gothic Revival Châteauesque style to complement the adjacent Parliament buildings. The hotel is above the Colonel By Valley, home of the Ottawa Locks of the Rideau Canal, and overlooks the Ottawa River. The main dining room (now the Laurier Room) overlooks Major's Hill Park. The reception rooms consist of the Wedgewood-blue Adam Room, the Laurier Room defined with Roman columns, the Empire-style ballroom, and the Drawing Room decorated with cream and gold plaster ornament. The hotel was designated a national historic site in 1980.

== History ==
=== Grand Trunk Railway 1909–1923 ===
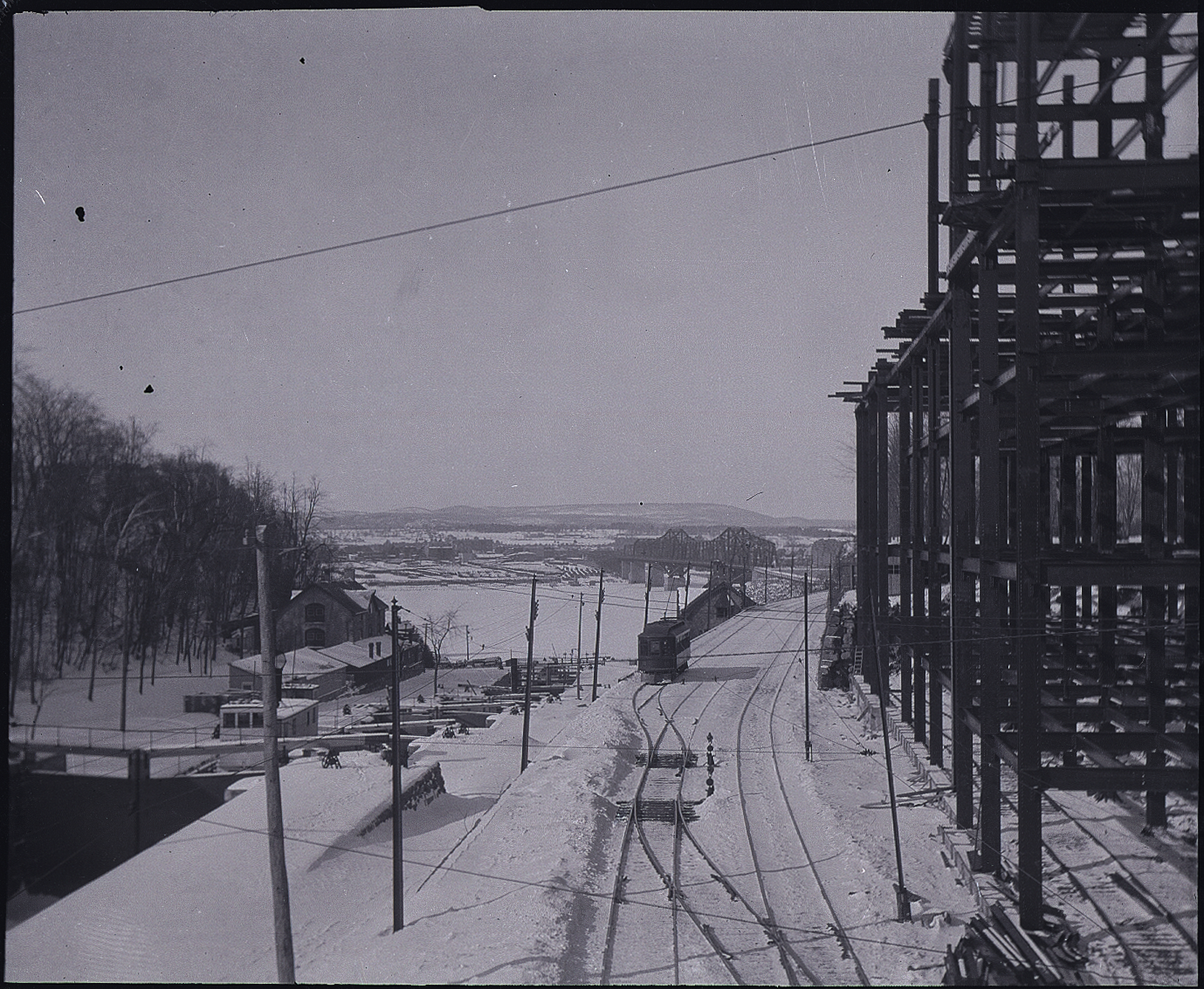
Chateau Laurier construction site with the Ottawa River in the background, 1910

Grand Trunk Railway president Charles Melville Hays commissioned Château Laurier, and construction occurred between 1909 and 1912 for CA$2 million, in tandem with Ottawa's downtown Union Station (now the Senate of Canada Building) across Rideau Street. A tunnel under Rideau Street links the two buildings. When the hotel first opened, private rooms cost $2 per night. Out of the 350 bedrooms, 155 had private baths, while the remaining 104 rooms were equipped with washstands with hot and cold water connections. In addition, dormitories and communal bathrooms were available, as well as rooms for travelling salespeople with sample tables for displaying goods.

The hotel showcases original Tiffany stained-glass windows and hand-moulded plaster decorations dating back to 1912. The building is adorned with Indiana limestone on the exterior walls. It features conical turrets, dormer windows, and a roof clad in copper. The gables are intricately carved with flowers, scrolls, and crests. The lobby floors are made of Belgian marble.

The plans for the hotel initially generated some controversy, as the Château was to be constructed on what was then a portion of Major's Hill Park. Sir Wilfrid Laurier, then the Prime Minister of Canada, helped secure the important site for the construction, and the hotel was eventually named in his honour. Laurier's government was also subsidizing the Grand Trunk Railway's Pacific Line. Further conflict ensued when the original architect, Bradford Gilbert from New York, was dismissed due to disagreements with Grand Trunk executives. They then engaged the Montreal firm of Ross and Macfarlane, to complete the design.

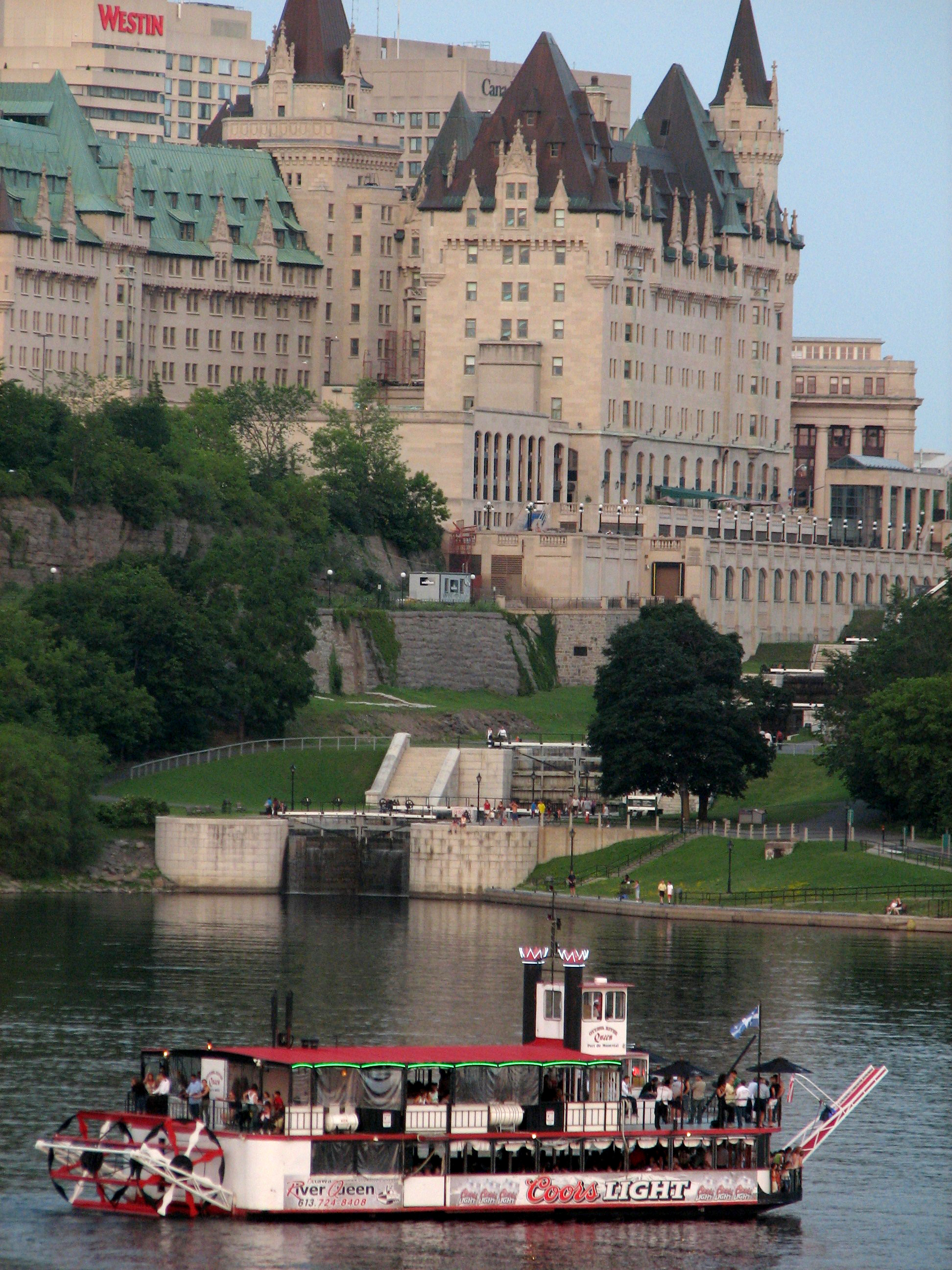
Château Laurier looking southeast across the Ottawa River

The hotel was scheduled to open on 26 April 1912. However, Hays, who was en route to Canada for the hotel opening, tragically perished aboard the RMS Titanic when it sank on 15 April. Grand Trunk officials held a more subdued opening ceremony on 12 June 1912, with Sir Wilfrid Laurier in attendance. The sub-basement housed laundry, repair shops, engineering and electrical departments. A barber shop was added in 1918.

In August 1914, Major Raymond Brutinel enrolled the first recruits for the Canadian Automobile Machine Gun Brigade (CAMGB) at the hotel. A memorial plaque with a circular bas-relief of Brigadier-General Brutinel and a bas-relief of machine gunners on Vimy Ridge is dedicated to the memory of Brutinel, who commanded the CAMGB, the members of the Canadian Machine Gun Brigade who died on active service, and in honour of those who served.

=== Canadian National Railway 1923–1988 ===
Porte-cochère entry on Wellington Street

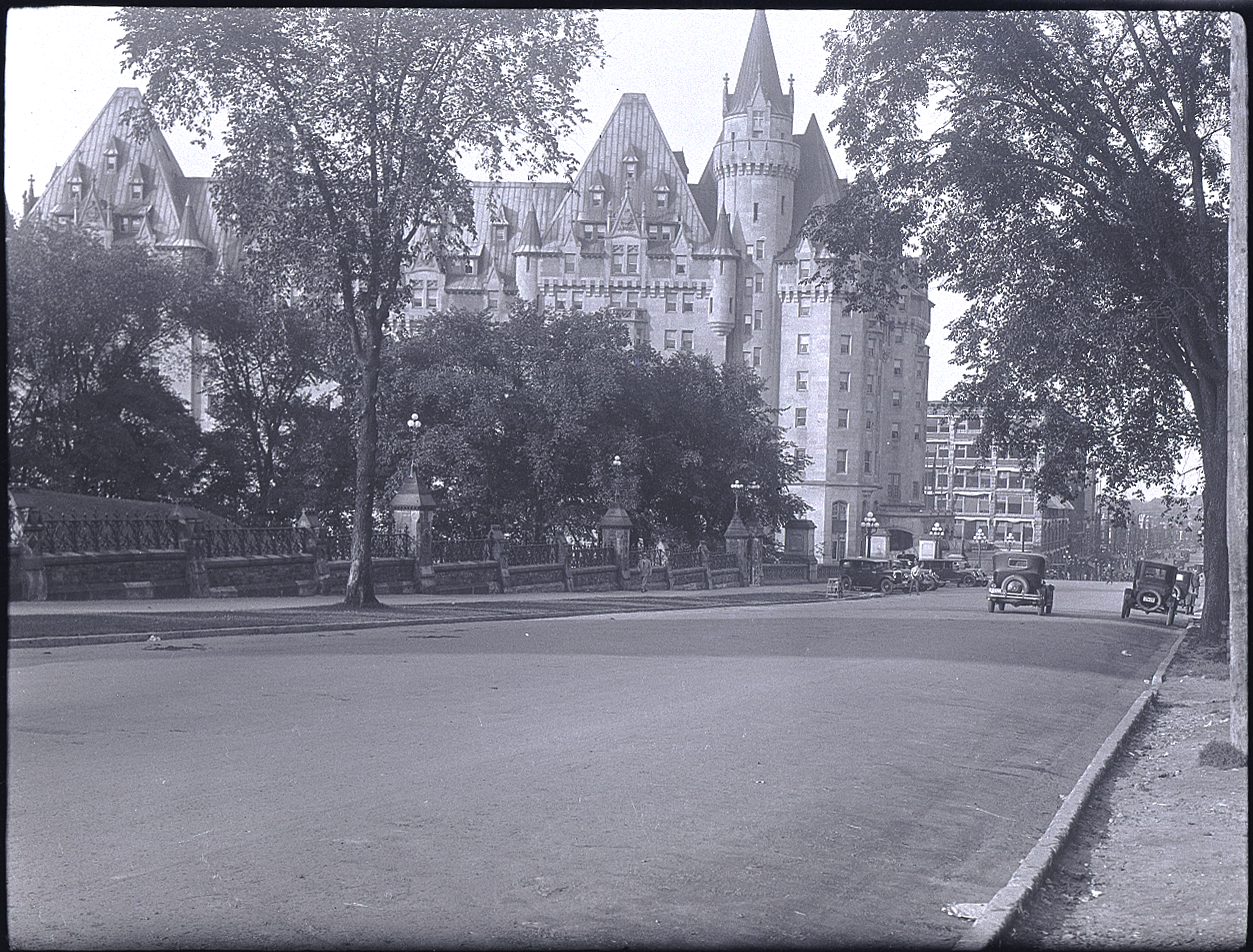
Chateau Laurier, July 1926

When the Grand Trunk became part of the Canadian National Railway in 1923, the Château Laurier became one of CN's most important hotels. In addition to serving hotel guests, the Château Laurier has also served over the years as the home of two important Ottawa institutions. From July 1924 to October 2004, the building housed the local English- and French-language radio stations of the Canadian Broadcasting Corporation (CBC) on the top seventh and eighth floors. Celebrated portrait photographer Yousuf Karsh maintained his studio and residence at the Château Laurier from 1972 to 1992.

In 1929, a CA$6 million east wing addition by Montreal architect John Smith Archibald and CN's architect John Schofield along Mackenzie Avenue added 240 rooms. Although the exterior of the addition had a French-inspired design, the interior lobby resembled that of an English or Scottish baronial hall. It featured dark oak panelling, a railed gallery overlooking the double-height space, and trophies of the hunt. The lobby led to a convention hall, music room and gentlemen's lounge. The ballroom featured a vaulted ceiling, columns and rich drapes. The ultra-modern kitchen was designed to cater to up to 5,000 people. The Jasper Tea Room, designed by Edwin Holgate in 1929, featured Pacific Coast aboriginal art, columns carved into totem poles surrounding a dance floor, and lamps decorated with motifs of bears, eagles and crows. From 1929 to 1991, the Canadian Grill was a softly-lit and dark-panelled below-ground restaurant where diners ate the specialty, roast prime rib of beef au jus and danced to live music.

In 1930, the hotel added a 60-foot (18 m) indoor pool in Art Deco style. In the 1930s and 1940s, the "therapeutic" spas offered electric therapy, ultra-violet ray lamps and alternate streams of hot and cold water to clients with nervous afflictions, polio or back problems.

For years, the hotel thrived, playing host to royalty, heads of state, political figures, celebrities and members of Canada's elite. R. B. Bennett lived in a suite in the hotel during his term as Canadian prime minister, from 1930 to 1935.

In the early 1960s, radio and television host Alex Trebek lived and worked in the Chateau Laurier.

During the 1960s and 1970s, the construction of numerous competing hotels in the capital, as well as the closure of Union Station, led to a slow decline in the Château's fortunes.

In 1965, the Jasper Lounge was redecorated to resemble an English tavern called the Cock and Lion featuring oak and old brick walls. The union protested management's decision to replace the male waiters with young women in low-cut tops to serve in the new pub, but they lost the case in court.

In March 1968, Graham Nash and Joni Mitchell stayed at the Chateau while performing concerts in Ottawa. Nash visited Mitchell's room, where she played him 18 of her current songs. Soon thereafter, the two began a romantic relationship that would be chronicled in the songs "Willy" by Mitchell and "Our House" by Nash.

In 1981, the hotel was designated a National Historic Site of Canada. The Westin Hotel opened across the street in 1983, and the owners undertook a CA$21 million renovation in the 1980s to refurbish and renovate the Château Laurier, thus restoring its position as Ottawa's pre-eminent hotel. They added a new porte-cochère on Wellington Street, lightened the lobby's dark wood and removed the animal trophies and barbershop. The fourth floor featured a separate lounge and concierge desk. The smoke shop was transformed into the Reading Room, and a skylit boutique mall replaced the Cock and Lion lounge. In 1985, Zoe's Lounge, named for Zoé Laurier, Sir Wilfred Laurier's wife, opened in a new glassed-in area overlooking Rideau Street.

By 1991, Peacock Alley, a spot for socializing and "to see and be seen," situated on a wide corridor on the main level extending along the west side of the hotel, was replaced by fine-dining restaurant Wilfrid's. This new restaurant offered views of the Parliament Buildings, the Rideau Canal locks and the Ottawa River.

=== Canadian Pacific Hotels 1988–1999 ===
The hotel was operated by Canadian National Hotels until the chain was purchased by Canadian Pacific Hotels in 1988.

=== Fairmont Hotels and Resorts 1999–present ===
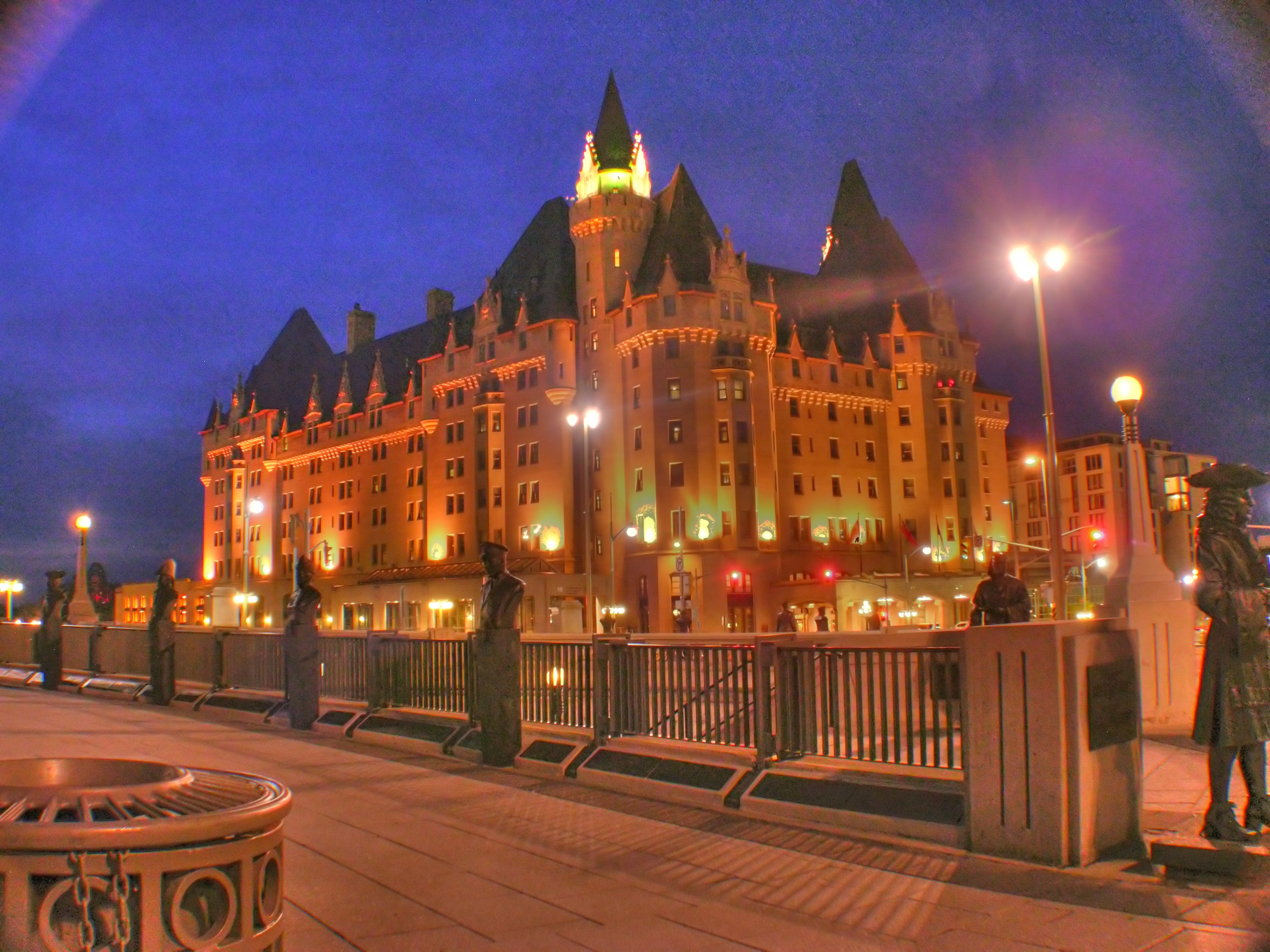
Château Laurier looking northeast at dusk

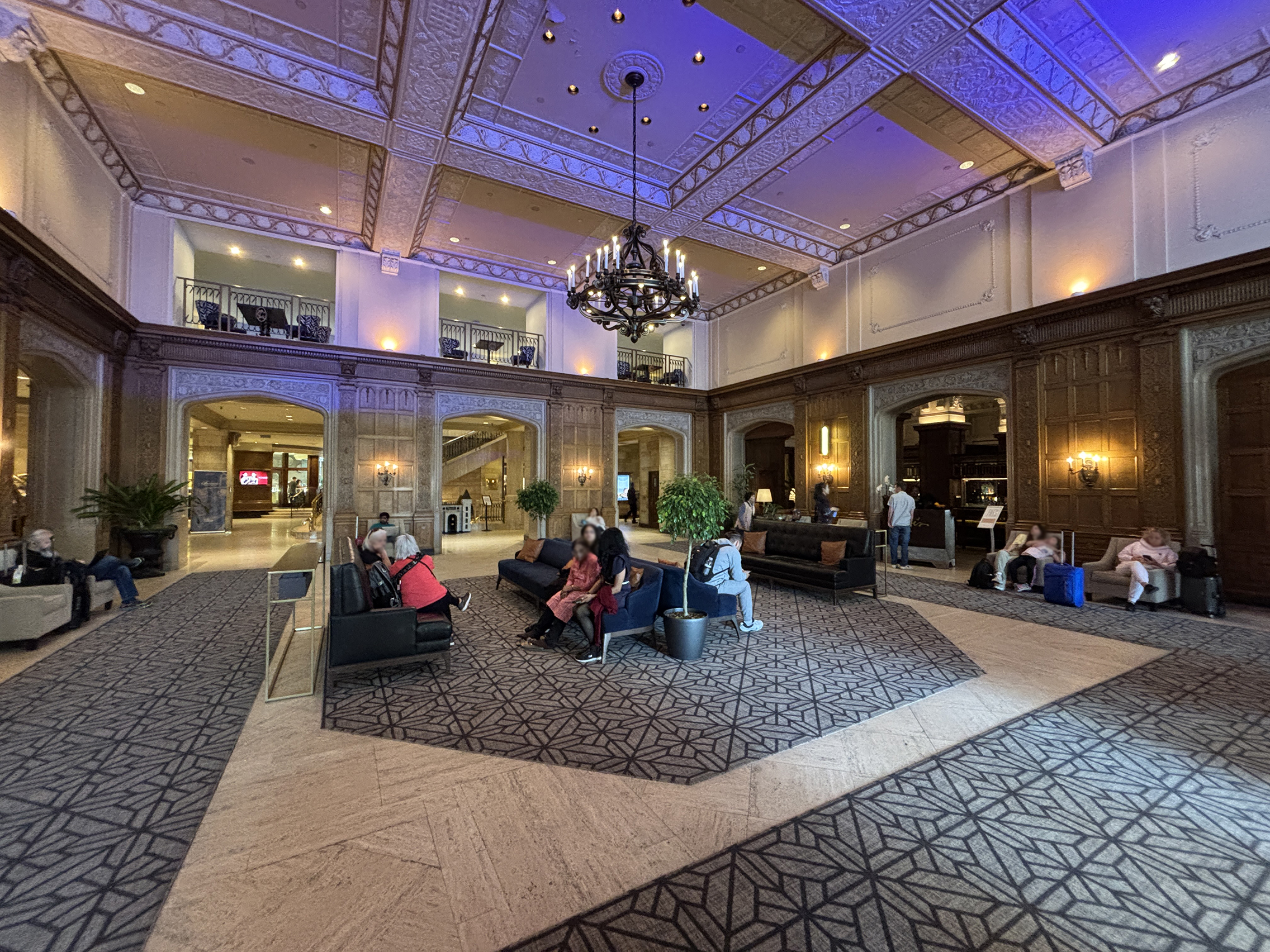
Château Laurier Lobby

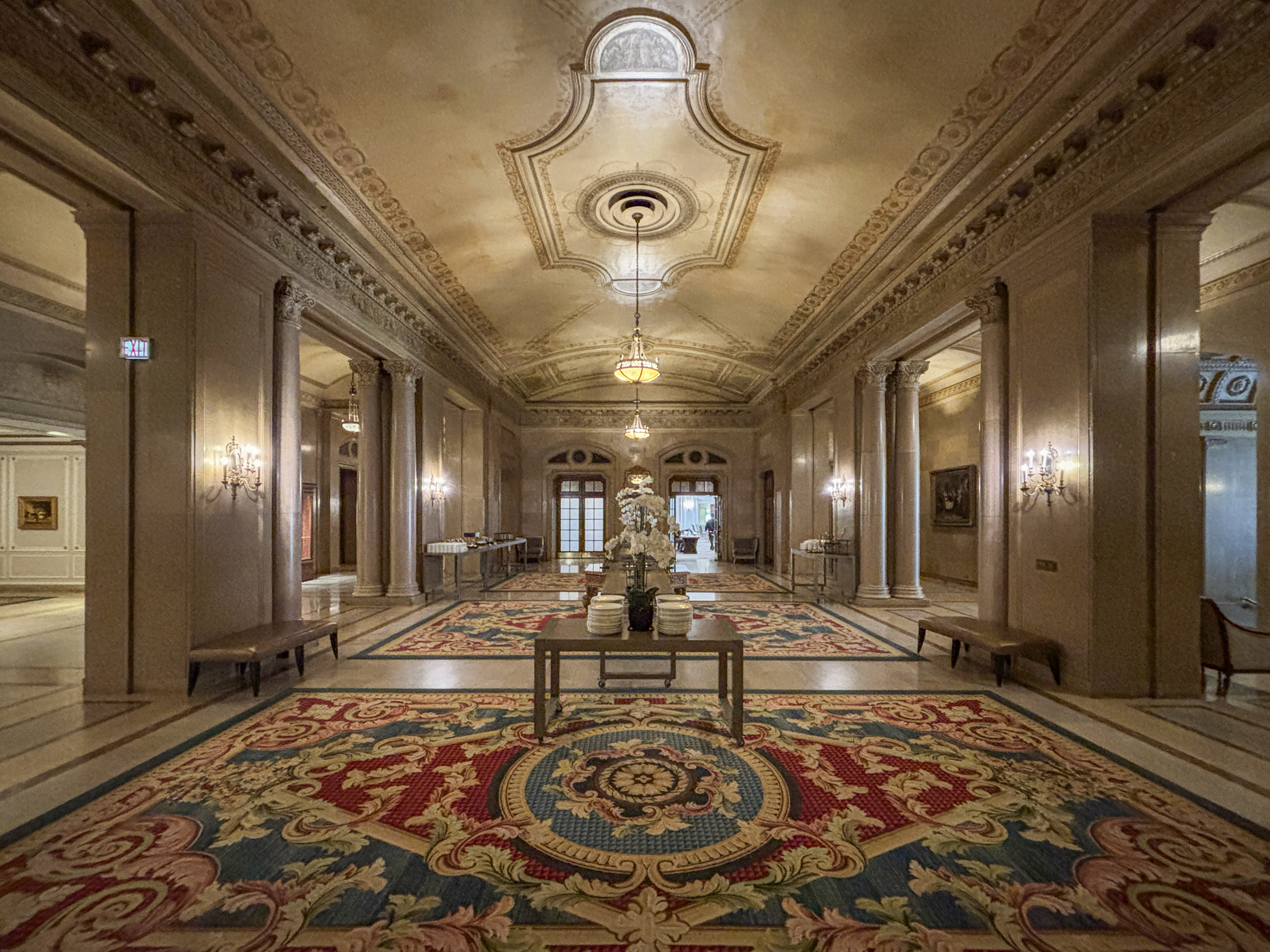
Château Laurier Drawing Room

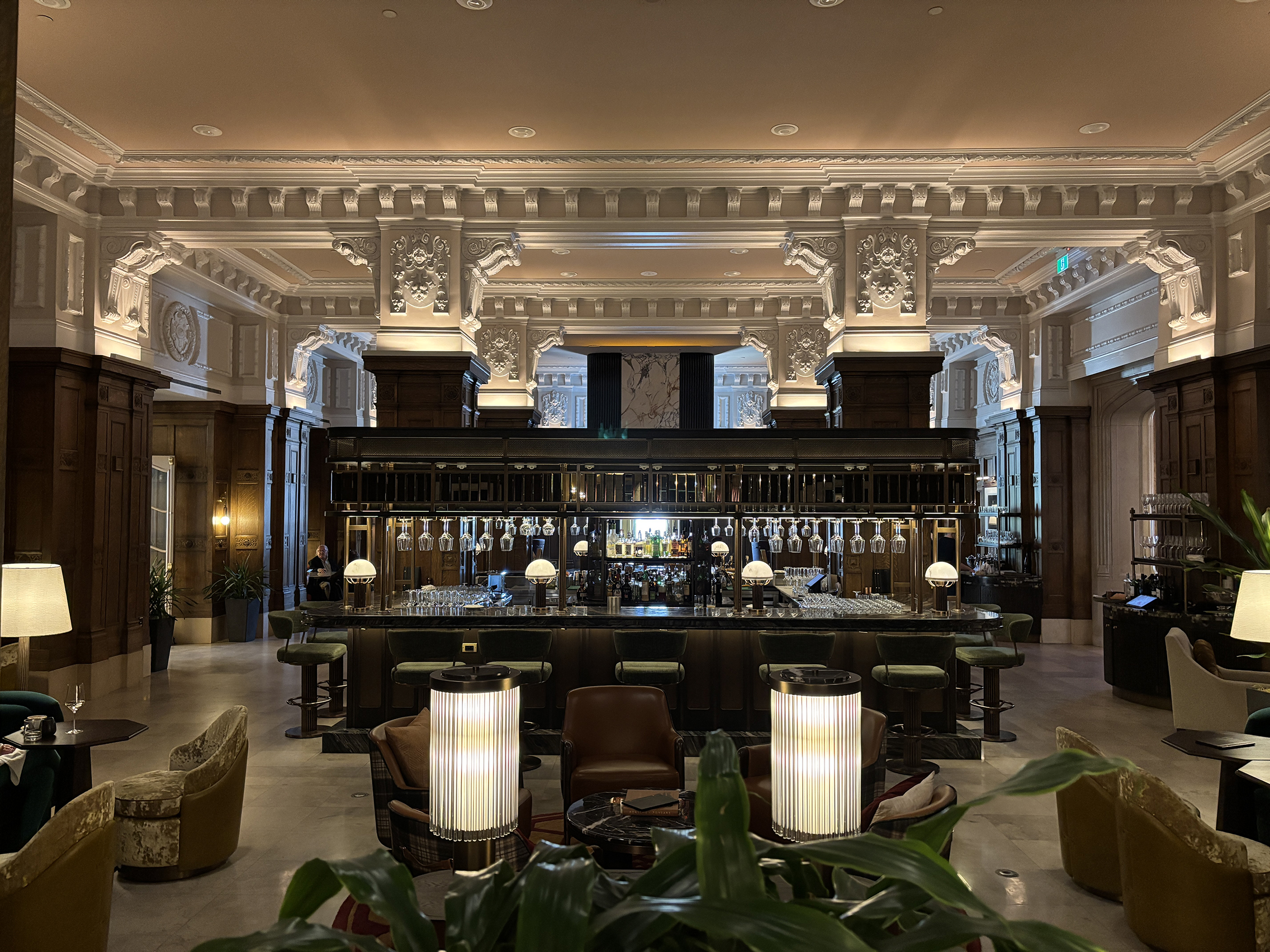
Zoe's Lounge

In 1999, it was renamed the Fairmont Château Laurier after Canadian Pacific Hotels bought the American Fairmont hotel chain and changed its name to Fairmont Hotels and Resorts. The new look was provided by Wilfrid's on the main level, its big windows giving light and views of the Parliament Buildings, the Rideau Canal locks and the Ottawa River.

The hotel is just metres away from some of the capital's most important landmarks and state/diplomatic buildings, including Parliament Hill, the Rideau Canal, the National Gallery of Canada, the ByWard Market, the National War Memorial, the U.S. Embassy, and the CF Rideau Centre. Given its proximity to these buildings and the fact that it has served as a home and meeting place for many notable political figures over the years, the hotel has often been referred to as "the third chamber of Parliament."

The hotel was the inspiration for the "Hotel du Canada" at the Canada (Epcot) pavilion in Orlando, Florida. In 2000, the Royal Architectural Institute of Canada chose the building as one of the top 500 buildings produced in Canada during the last millennium. Coinciding with its 100th anniversary, Fairmont Château Laurier was included amongst other architecturally interesting and historically significant buildings in Doors Open Ottawa, held 2–3 June 2012.

In 2013, Capital Hotel Limited Partnership (an affiliate of Vancouver's Larco Investments Ltd.) purchased the hotel but retained Fairmont to manage it. In September 2016, Larco proposed a significant addition to develop suites for long-term stays. The design of the addition differs considerably from that of the original building, and has been met with criticism. Ottawa council unanimously voted to download the power to approve the renovation to city staff in June 2018. Because of an unprecedented public outcry, there was a motion to revoke Larco's Heritage permit until it submitted a design more aligned with the original structure. That motion was defeated by Ottawa Council by a vote of 13–10 on July 11, 2019, and the project proceeded.

Despite initial proceedings, UNESCO has requested that the extension on the hotel be re-assessed, as there are concerns about the integrity of the view of the surrounding canals.

In 2018, the hotel was the setting of the dramatic web series Chateau Laurier. Due to budget constraints, however, the series was actually filmed at the Fairmont Royal York in Toronto.

== See also ==
- Russell House (Ottawa) – the Château Laurier succeeded the Russell as Ottawa's premier hotel
- List of designated heritage properties in Ottawa
