= Autocar Type XXI =

1908 American truck

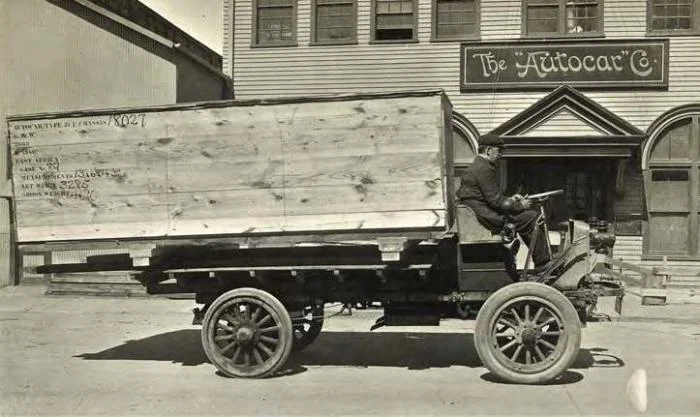
- Autocar Type XXI fitted with pneumatic front tires and solid rear tires

Overview
- Manufacturer: Autocar Company
- Production: 1908–1926

Body and chassis
- Class: 2-ton truck
- Body style: Cab-over engine
- Layout: Front-engine, rear-wheel-drive

Powertrain
- Engine: 2-cylinder horizontally opposed engine petrol 18 hp (13 kW) (Note: S.A.E. or N.A.C.C. horsepower rating.)
- Transmission: 3-forward, 1-reverse
- Propulsion: 4x2

Dimensions
- Wheelbase: 8 ft 1 in (2.46 m)
- Length: 14 ft 4 in (4.37 m)
- Width: 6 ft (1.83 m)

Chronology
- Predecessor: Type XVIII

The Autocar Type XXI was a truck model manufactured by the American Autocar Company. Produced from 1908, over 30,000 Autocar Type XXIs were produced before production ceased in 1926. The vehicle was used by the British and Canadian armies during the First World War, and it was the basis of the Autocar Armoured Car.

== Design ==
The Type XXI was a cab-over engine, rear-wheel-drive truck with a payload capacity of 2 short tons (1.79 long tons; 1.81 t). The Type XXI had a chassis length of 8 ft 1 in (2.46 m) and a gauge of 4 ft 10 in (1.47 m), the chassis was made of steel channel with hardwood pressed in between, giving it strength and flexibility. British Army Type XXIs were 14 ft 4 in (4.37 m) total length and 6 ft (1.83 m) wide.

The Type XXI was powered by a 2-cylinder horizontally opposed engine 18 hp (13 kW) petrol engine with a bore and stroke of 4 3/4 by 4 1/2 in (121 by 114 mm) and a 4,520 cc (276 cu in) displacement, ignition was by magneto. The truck was driven through a three-speed transmission, it had a worm final drive rear axle, leaf spring suspension and rear drum brakes. The Type XXI could be fitted with either pneumatic or solid tires. If fitted, the pneumatic tires measured 36 in × 5 in (91 cm × 13 cm) front and rear, whilst solid tires measured 34 in × 3 1/2 in–4 1/2 in (86.4 cm × 8.9 cm–11.4 cm) front and 34 in × 4 in–5 in (86 cm × 10 cm–13 cm) rear.

== History ==
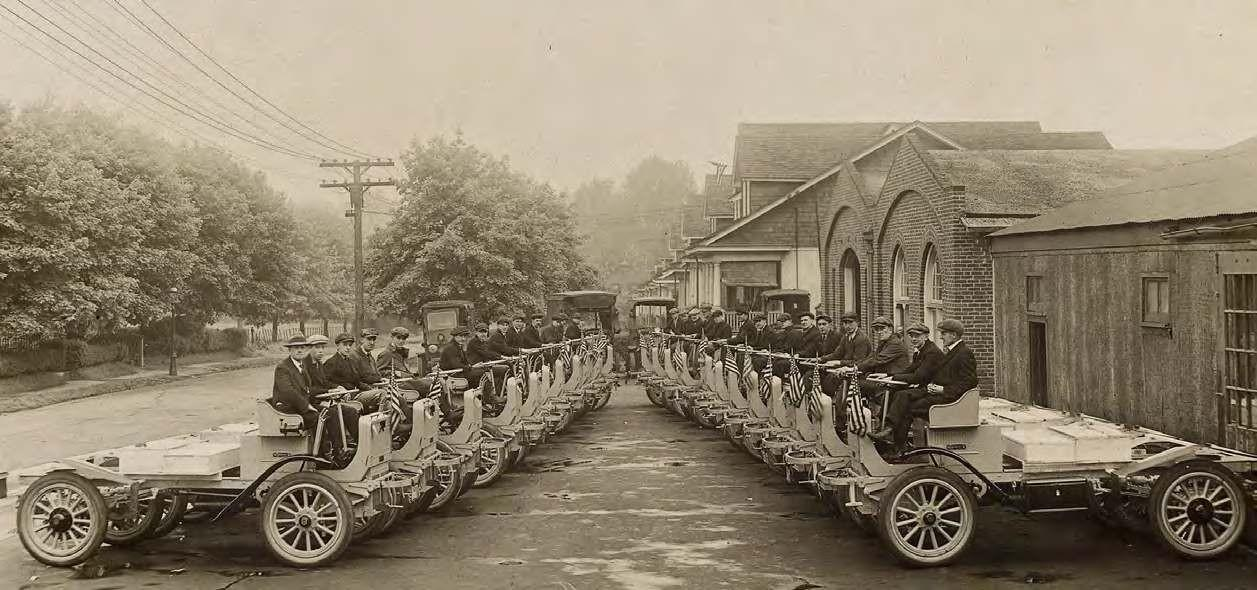
Test drivers display their Autocar UF21s shortly before delivery to the British Army in East Africa

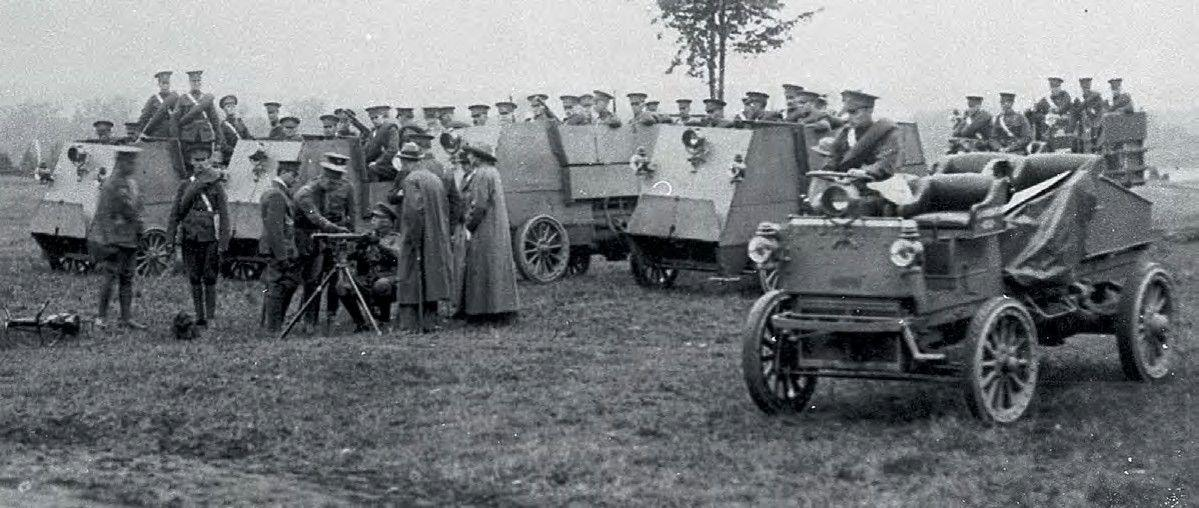
Canadian Army Autocar UF21s shortly after formation. In front in a UF21 officer's command car, behind is four Autocar Armoured Cars, and in the rear a UF21 supply truck

Prior to 1907, the Autocar Company had produced only passenger vehicles, and in that year the company began experimenting with commercial designs. The following year, the company introduced its first production commercial vehicle, the 1-ton cab-over Type XVIII which had a 7 ft 3 in (2.21 m) wheelbase and was powered by the 2-cylinder 18 hp (13 kW) engine. Later that year (Note: The majority of sources state the Autocar Type XXI was first produced in 1908, but some state it was first produced in 1909.) the company introduced the slightly larger 2-ton Type XXI, with the same engine but a longer wheelbase.

The Type XXI developed a reputation as a rugged and reliable truck, and remained in production until 1926. The Type XXI was available in a number of body styles, many were bodied as buses. The company suspended production of passenger vehicles in 1911, and until 1919 when the company introduced a new range of 2–5-ton truck models, the Types XVIII and XXI were the only models the company produced. When Autocar ceased production of the Type XXI, over 30,000 had been produced.

=== Military service ===
As some point in the late 1900s or early 1910s the Type XXI was tested by the US Army. Sources suggest a very small number may have been used by US National Guard units, but the type was never adopted for use by regular US forces, and none were sent to Europe with the American Expeditionary Forces during the First World War.

In 1914 the Canadian Army purchased 20 Type XXI-UFs (usually referred to as UF21s) fitted with a variety of bodies. Ten were fitted with armoured plate and machine guns, becoming the Autocar Armoured Car, four were fitted as officers command cars, three were fitted for carrying ammunition and equipment, one for carrying fuel and oil, one as a repair truck and one as an ambulance. Arriving in the United Kingdom in late 1914, they were not sent to France until June 1915. All of the non-armoured vehicles were subsequently rebodied as General Service transports.

Throughout the First World War the British War Office was constantly looking for additional motor transport, having a need for light trucks in 1917 they placed and order with the Autocar Company for 460 UF21s. Rated for 30-cwt (1.5 long tons; 1.7 short tons; 1.5 t) payloads in British service, the UF21s were shipped to Britain as bare chassis and had bodywork fitted upon their arrival. 265 were fitted with rectangular water tanks and used as water carriers on the Western front, 6 were retained in the United Kingdom and 189 were fitted with General Service cargo bodies and sent to East Africa for use as supply carriers. After the Ford Model T, the UF21 was the second most numerous motor vehicle in service with the British during the East African campaign, both types were fitted with pneumatic tires and compared to other types both stood up very well to the harsh the conditions encountered during the campaign.
