= Canadian Automobile Machine Gun Brigade =

Part of the Canadian Expeditionary Force (1914 to 1919)

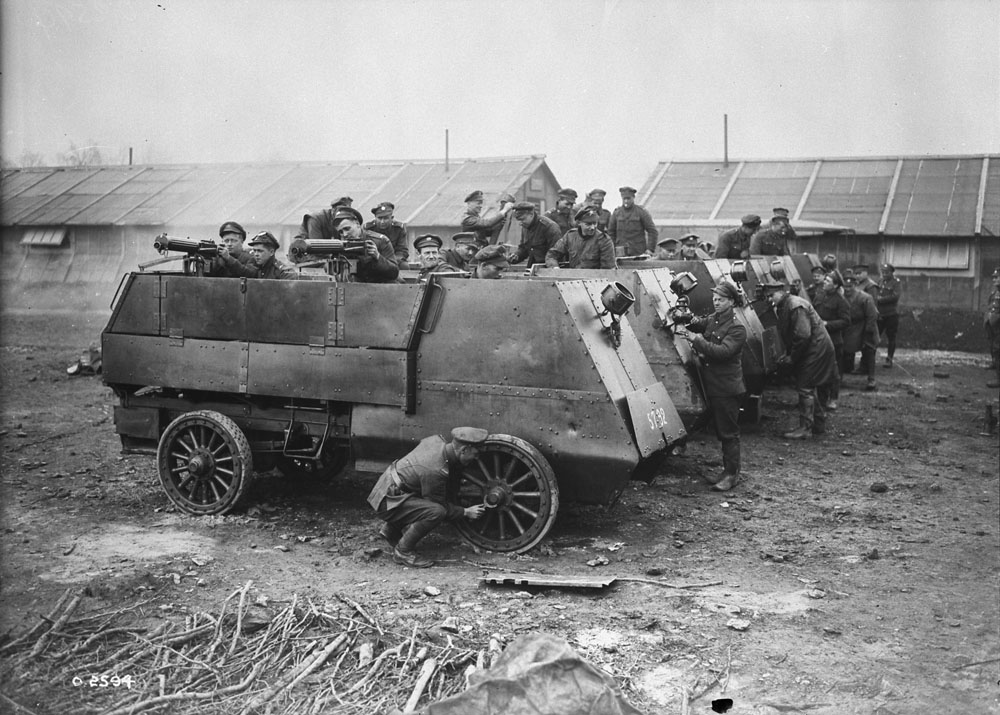
- Cleaning armoured cars
- Active: 24 August 1914–1919
- Country: Canada
- Branch: Canadian Expeditionary Force
- Type: Motorized infantry
- Part of: Canadian Independent Force
- Nickname: Brutinel's Brigade
- Engagements: World War I

Commanders
- Notable commanders: Brigadier-General Raymond Brutinel

The Canadian Automobile Machine Gun Brigade, also known as Brutinel's Brigade or the Brutinel Brigade, was the first fully motorized unit of the Canadian Expeditionary Force (CEF) during the First World War. It was established on August 24, 1914, in Ottawa, Ontario, Canada, as Automobile Machine Gun Brigade No. 1 by Canadian Brigadier-General Raymond Brutinel, who initiated the program and was the unit's first commander. The unit played a significant part in halting the major German spring offensive of March 1918, and in the final Hundred Days Offensive when it was part of the Canadian Independent Force (CIF) commanded by Brutinel.

== History ==
The brigade was originally equipped with eight Armoured Autocars mounting two Colt Model 1914 machine guns (later replaced with the standard British Vickers MG) manufactured by Autocar in Ardmore, Pennsylvania, United States. Autocar also supplied six unarmoured support vehicles, four "roadsters" for the brigade's officers, and an ambulance.

Field Marshal Sir Douglas Haig wrote that the "work of the 1st CMMG Brigade in recent operations has proved the value that can be obtained from such units, and recommends the formation of a 2nd Brigade be undertaken forthwith." So in May 1918 the 2nd Canadian Motor MG Brigade was added. With the new unit Brutinel's CIF consisted of the 1st and 2nd Motor Machine Gun Brigade (each of five 8-gun batteries), Canadian Corps Cyclist Battalion, one section of medium trench-mortars mounted on lorries (plus an assumed wireless and medical support). This totalled 80 machine guns and about 300 bicycle infantry. Canadian historian John A. English points out that this "was the first mechanized formation in the Commonwealth armies and the forerunner of the armoured division."

The brigade in 1915

"In early 1918 the brigade saw heavy defensive action during the German spring offensives. It played an important role in the Battle of Amiens in the second half of 1918. Later that year, the Canadians formed the 2nd Canadian Motor Machine Gun Brigade and the two brigades, along with cavalry, cyclists, trench mortar sections and an artillery battery, comprised the Canadian Independent Force."

== Structure ==
By June 1916 there were five batteries in the brigade:

- A Battery (Armoured Autocar)
- B Battery (Armoured Autocar)
- C Battery (Machine Gunners)
- D Battery (Machine Gunners)
- E Battery (Machine Gunners)

== Bibliography ==
Notes

References

- Cameron Pulsifer (2007). The Armoured Autocar in Canadian Service, Service Publications
- Dominique and Jacques Baylaucq (2014), 1882–1964 Brutinel, The extraordinary story of a French citizen, Brigadier-general in the Canadian Army
- Griffith, Paddy (1994). Battle Tactics of the Western Front: The British Army's Art of Attack, 1916–18. Yale University Press. ISBN 978-0300160611. –Total pages: 304
- English, John A. (2009). The Canadian Army & Normandy Campaign. Stackpole Books. ISBN 978-1461751854. – Total pages: 352
- Pulsifer, Cameron (2001). "Canada's First Armoured Unit: Raymond Brutinel and the Canadian Motor Machine Gun Brigades of the First World War". Canadian Military History. 10 (1): 44–57. ISSN 1195-8472.
