= John A. English =

Canadian army veteran and writer (born 1940)

- Born: 12 October 1940 (age 85)
- Education: Duke University
- Occupations: Canadian historian and retired soldier

Lt.Col.-Dr. John A. English (born 12 October 1940) is a Canadian Army veteran and a writer on historical and military topics.

== Life and career ==
English was educated at Royal Roads (1958–1960) and the Royal Military College (1960–1962), he went on leave without pay to attain an MA in history from Duke University in 1963–1964. He passed final promotion exams in 1966 and graduated from Canadian Forces Staff College in 1972. He first joined the King's Own Calgary Regiment and from 1962 served in the Queen's Own Rifles of Canada until 1970, when he moved to Princess Patricia's Canadian Light Infantry.

In 1980, he attained an MA in war studies from RMC, and a Ph.D. from Queen's University in 1989 while still in service. During his career he saw service with Canadian and British regiments in England, Germany, Denmark, Cyprus, Canada, and Alaska. English also served as a NATO war plans officer, Chief of Tactics of the Combat Training Centre, instructor at the Canadian Land Forces Command and Staff College, and curriculum director of the National Defence College. English retired from the Canadian army after 37 years of service in 1993.

In 1992, English accepted a $60,000 Social Sciences and Humanities Research Council of Canada (SSHRCC) fellowship and a professorship at Queen's University. Two years later he was awarded a $31,000 SSHRCC research grant. For five years between 1997 and 2002 English served as a Professor of Strategy with the US Naval War College. On return to Canada he was employed until November 2003 as director of the Defence Minister's Monitoring Committee on Change. On 19 October 2004, the Minister appointed him Honorary Lieutenant-Colonel of the Brockville Rifles and from 2010 to 2013 he served as Honorary Colonel.

== Works ==
English is the author of:

- A Perspective on Infantry (Praeger, 1981) republished in paperback as On Infantry (Praeger, 1984)
- The Canadian Army and the Normandy Campaign: A Study of Failure in High Command (Praeger, 1991) [republished in paperback as The Canadian Army and the Normandy Campaign (Stackpole, 2009)]
- Marching through Chaos: The Descent of Armies in Theory and Practice (Praeger, 1996)
- Lament for an Army: The Decline of Canadian Military Professionalism (Irwin, 1998)
- Patton's Peers: The Forgotten Allied Field Army Commanders of the Western Front 1944-45 (Stackpole, 2009)
- Surrender Invites Death: Fighting the Waffen SS in Normandy (Stackpole, 2011)
- Monty and the Canadian Army (University of Toronto Press, 2021)

He was also the co-author of On Infantry: Revised Edition (Praeger, 1994) [translated into Chinese] and principal editor of The Mechanized Battlefield: A Tactical Analysis (Pergamon, 1984). He has additionally produced numerous chapters for books and his articles have appeared in Military Affairs, Jane's Military Review, the Naval War College Review, Infantry magazine, the Marine Corps Gazette, the Canadian Defence Quarterly, the Canadian Military Journal and the proceedings of the Canadian Institute of Strategic Studies. He has been a member of the Royal Canadian Military Institute since 1971 and continues to write on military subjects.

== Bibliography ==
- English, John (1981). A Perspective on Infantry. Praeger. ISBN 978-0-03-059699-5.
- English, John (1991). The Canadian Army and the Normandy Campaign. Greenwood Publishing Group. ISBN 978-0-275-93019-6.
- English, John; Gudmunsson, Bruce (1994). On Infantry. Greenwood Publishing Group. ISBN 978-0-275-94972-3.
- English, John (1996). Marching Through Chaos: The Descent of Armies in Theory and Practice. Praeger. ISBN 978-0-275-94657-9.
- English, John (1998). Lament for an Army: The Decline of Canadian Military Professionalism. Irwin. ISBN 978-0-7725-2520-8.
- English, John (2009). Patton's Peers: The Forgotten Allied Field Army Commanders of the Western Front, 1944–45. Stackpole Books. ISBN 978-0-8117-0501-1.

Surrender Invites Death: Fighting the Waffen SS in Normandy (Stackpole, 2011).
