= Couloumé-Mondebat =

- Commune
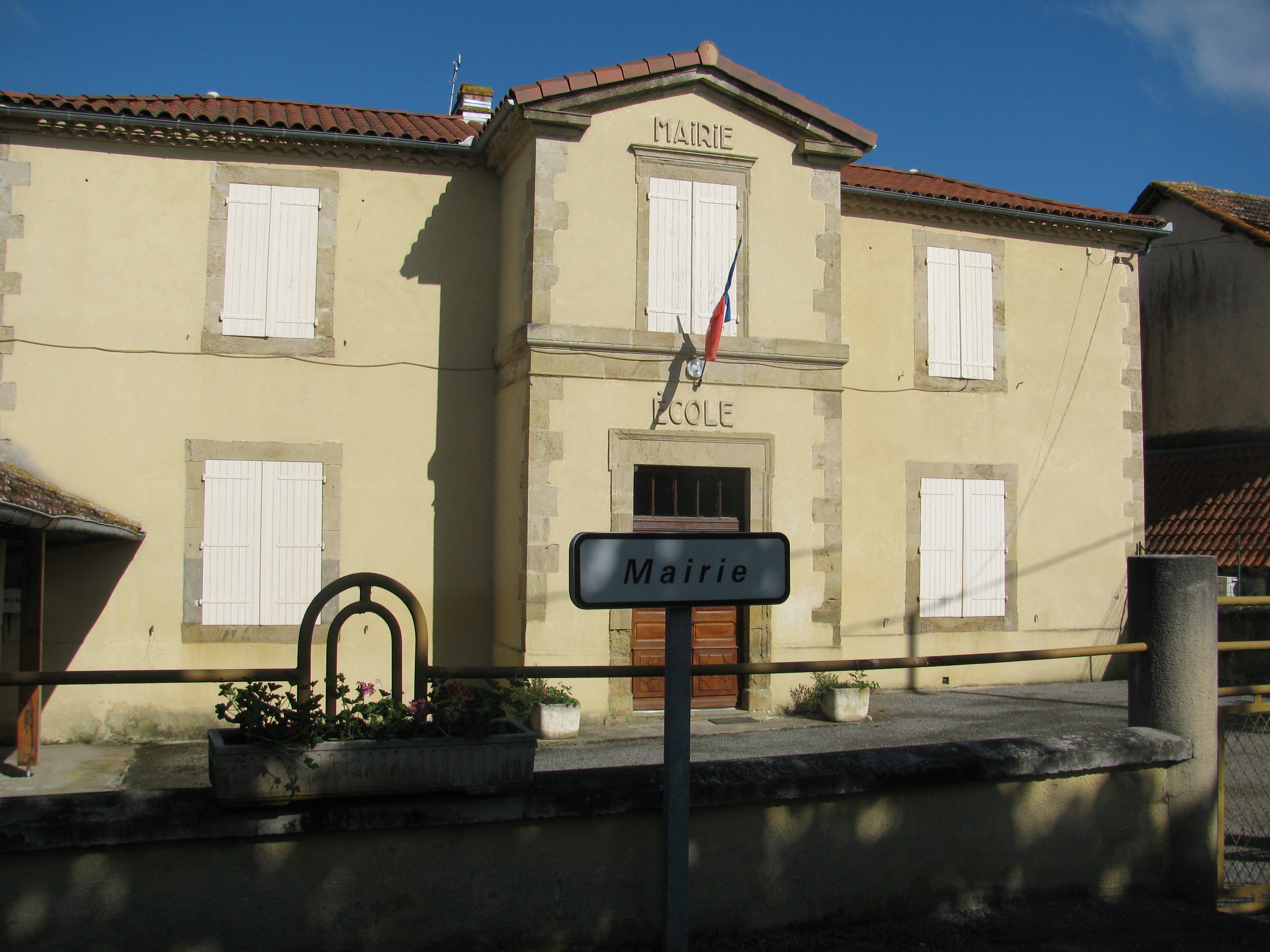
- The town hall in Couloumé

- Coat of arms
- Location of Couloumé-Mondebat
- Location within France Location within Occitanie
- Coordinates: 43°38′32″N 0°05′36″E
- Country: France
- Region: Occitania
- Department: Gers
- Arrondissement: Mirande
- Canton: Pardiac-Rivière-Basse

Government
  - Mayor (2020–2026): Pascal Fort
- Area^{1}: 22.85 km^{2} (8.82 sq mi)
- Elevation: 110 m (360 ft)
- Highest elevation: 245 m (804 ft)
- Lowest elevation: 122 m (400 ft)
- Population (2023): 207
  - Density: 9.06/km^{2} (23.5/sq mi)
- Time zone: UTC+01:00 (CET)
  - Summer (DST): UTC+02:00 (CEST)
- INSEE/Postal code: 32109 /32160
- ^{1} French Land Register data, which excludes lakes, ponds, glaciers > 1 km^{2} (0.386 sq mi or 247 acres) and river estuaries.

Couloumé-Mondebat is a commune in the Gers department in southwestern France.

== Geography ==
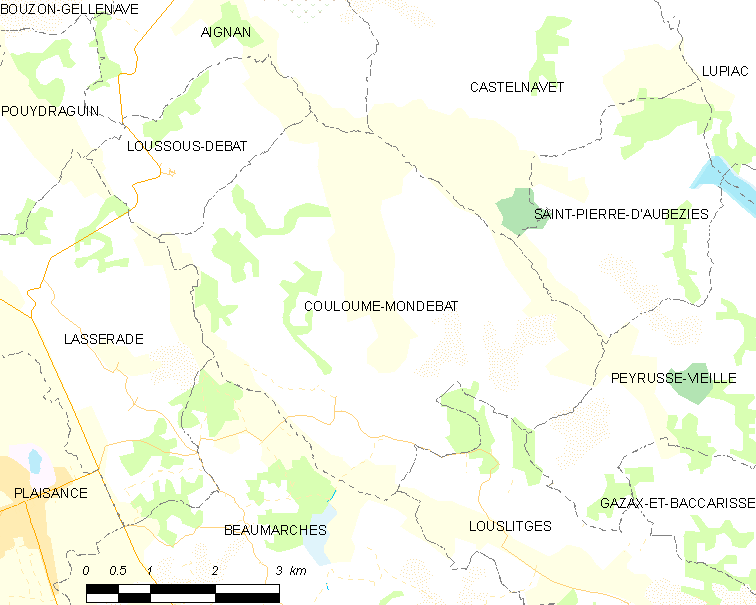
Couloumé-Mondebat and its surrounding communes

== Population ==
Historical population
Year	Pop.	±% p.a.
1968	331	—
1975	271	−2.82%
1982	263	−0.43%
1990	232	−1.56%
1999	243	+0.52%
2007	209	−1.87%
2012	198	−1.08%
2017	194	−0.41%
2023	207	+1.09%
Source: INSEE

== See also ==
- Communes of the Gers department
