= Spencer Engineering Building =

Building at the University of Western Ontario

Alexander Charles Spencer Engineering Building
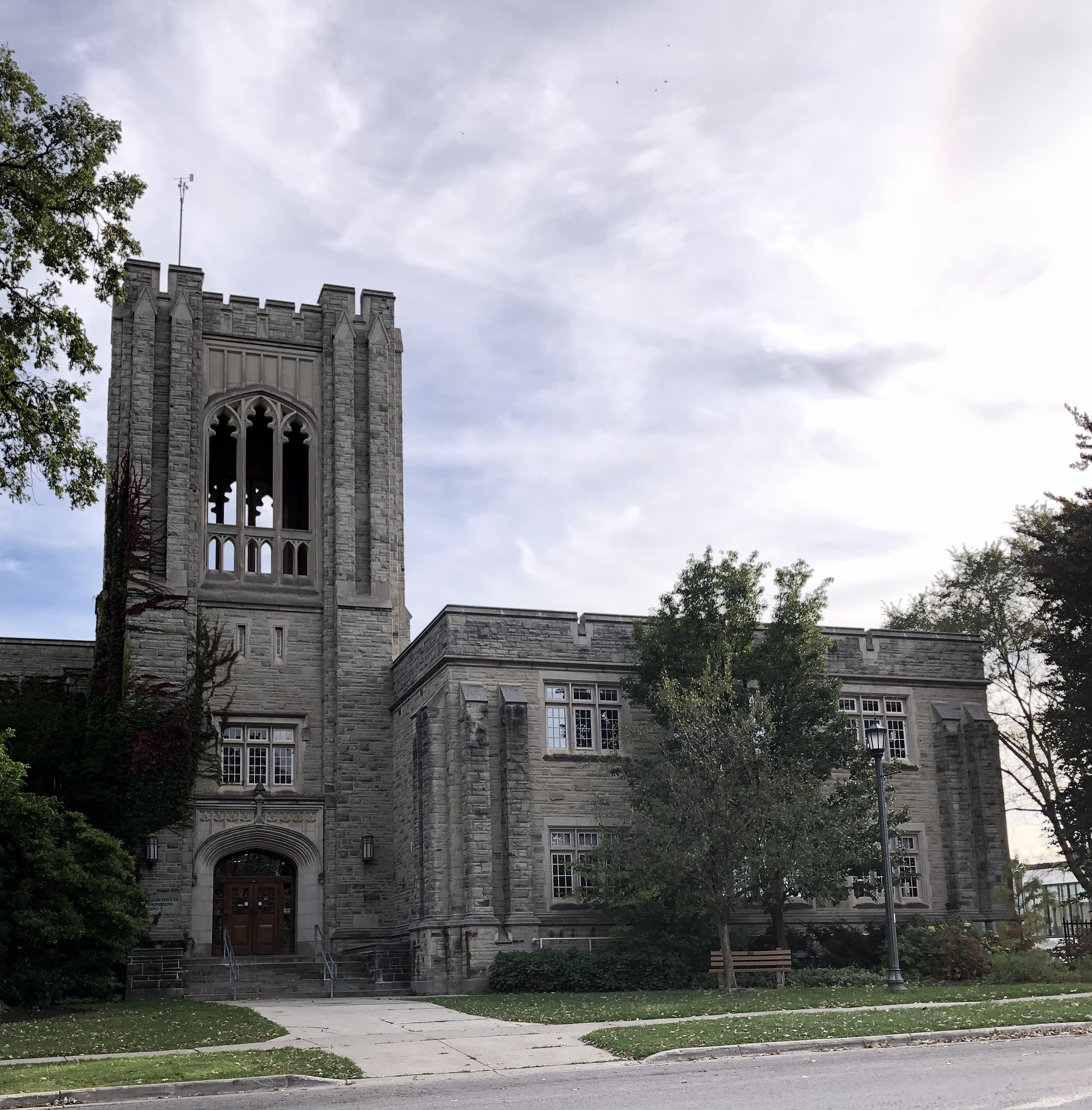
- Interactive map of the Alexander Charles Spencer Engineering Building area
- Alternative names: Spencer Engineering Building, SEB

General information
- Architectural style: Gothic Collegiate
- Location: London, Ontario, Canada
- Coordinates: 43.00542°N 81.27603°W
- Current tenants: Faculty of Engineering
- Construction started: March 1958
- Completed: April 1959
- Inaugurated: 30 October 1959
- Cost: 1.75 million CAD
- Owner: University of Western Ontario

Technical details
- Floor count: 3

The Alexander Charles Spencer Engineering Building, known as Spencer Engineering Building (SEB) is the main building of engineering faculty in University of Western Ontario. The Dean's office, Mechanical and Materials Engineering Department and Civil and Environmental Engineering Departments are in this building. The Electrical and Computer Engineering Department as well as the Chemical and Biochemical Engineering Department reside in the Thompson Engineering Building, which was opened in 2004.

== History ==
There became an increased need for an engineering-specific building on the Western campus ever since the establishment of the Department of Engineering Sciences in 1954. After much deliberation, construction began in early 1958 and was finished by April 1959. The cost of construction was totalled at $1.75 million. $500,000 of this cost was donated by Major General Alexander Charles Spencer. After being presented with this large donation, the Western Board of Governors agreed that the building would bear his name.

The building was built next to the Cronyn Observatory and built slightly on the edge of the expanding campus, away from the Faculty of Sciences buildings. There is some indirect evidence to suggest that this was done deliberately to help the new building and faculty develop their own 'character' and not be influenced by other already successful science-based programs, although this is debated speculation.

The building was designed by architect Ronald Murphy.
