= Raymond Brutinel =

Canadian general

- Born: 6 May 1882; Alet-les-Bains, Aude, France
- Died: 21 September 1964 (aged 82); Couloumé-Mondebat, Gers, France.
- Military career
- Units: Canadian Machine Gun Corps; Canadian Automobile Machine Gun Brigade
- Conflicts: World War I: German spring offensive; Hundred Days Offensive; World War II: Battle of France (evacuation aid only)

Brigadier-General Raymond Brutinel CB CMG DSO (6 May 1882 – 21 September 1964) was a geologist, journalist, soldier, entrepreneur and a pioneer in the field of mechanized warfare who commanded the Canadian Automobile Machine Gun Brigade during World War I, the first mechanized military unit in history.

== History ==
Raymond Brutinel was born in Alet-les-Bains, Aude, France. He immigrated to Western Canada in 1904 where he helped survey the route for the Grand Trunk Railway. He went on to edit Le Courrier de l'Ouest in Edmonton, Alberta, the first French-language newspaper west of Winnipeg, Manitoba.

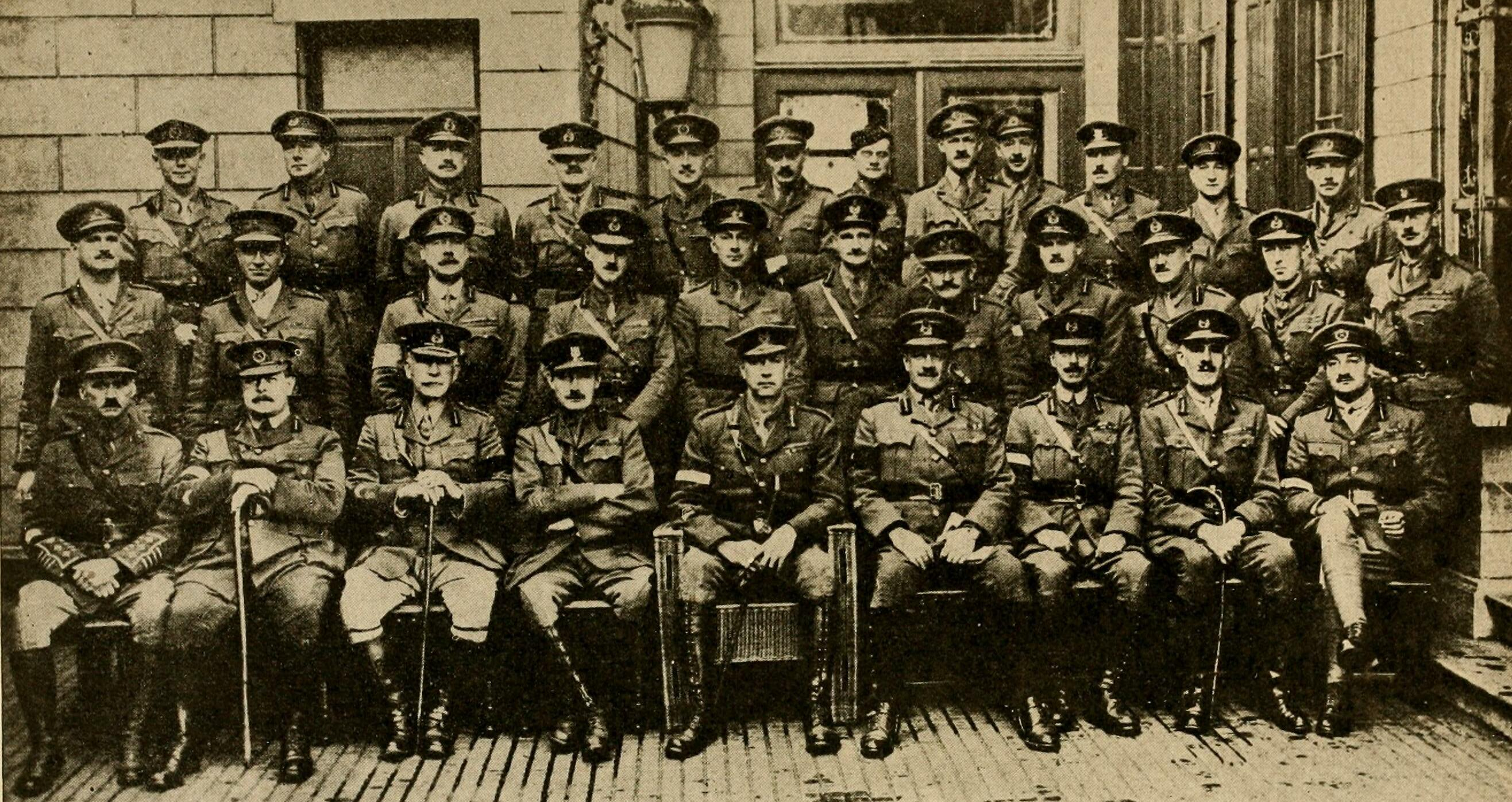
Lieutenant General Sir Arthur Currie with H.R.H. Prince Arthur of Connaught and other senior officers. Brigadier General Raymond Brutinel is sat in the front row, first on the right.

A member of the Canadian army in World War I, Brutinel initiated and commanded the Canadian Automobile Machine Gun Brigade, the first fully mechanized unit of the British Empire and the first mechanized unit in history. In August 1914, Major Raymond Brutinel enrolled the first recruits for the Canadian Machine Gun Corps in the Château Laurier Hotel in Ottawa, Ontario. A memorial plaque with a circular "bas relief" of Brigadier-General Brutinel's bust, and a "bas relief" of machine gunners on Vimy ridge are dedicated to the memory of Brigadier-General R. Brutinel, C.B. C.M.G. D.S.O. who commanded the Canadian Automobile Machine Gun Brigade and the members of the Canadian Machine Gun Brigade who died on active service and in honour of those who served. His brigade played a significant part in halting the major German offensive of March 1918. From October 1916 until March 1918, Brutinel was Corps MG Officer of the Canadian Corps and, in addition to his decorations, he was seven times Mentioned in Dispatches. He pioneered the virtues of mobility and concentration of firepower and developed the concept of indirect machine-gun fire.

In 1920 Brutinel returned to Europe, where he was a Creusot sales representative in the Balkans, but he retained many Canadian ties. Major-General Georges Vanier, Canadian ambassador to France and future Governor General of Canada, recorded the "considerable help" Brutinel provided in evacuating embassy staff from Paris in June 1940 in advance of the German occupation of France in World War II.

In early July 1945, Winston Churchill holidayed in Brutinel's house, Chateau de Bordaberry, outside Hendaye in southwestern France, near the Spanish border. Churchill then flew to Berlin for the Potsdam Conference during which he learned he had lost the 1945 election.

In 1961 he became a member of the Canadian Institute of Mines and Metallurgy Fifty-Year Club.

Raymond Brutinel died in 1964 at Couloumé-Mondebat, Gers, France.
