= M939 series 5-ton 6×6 truck =

M939 series
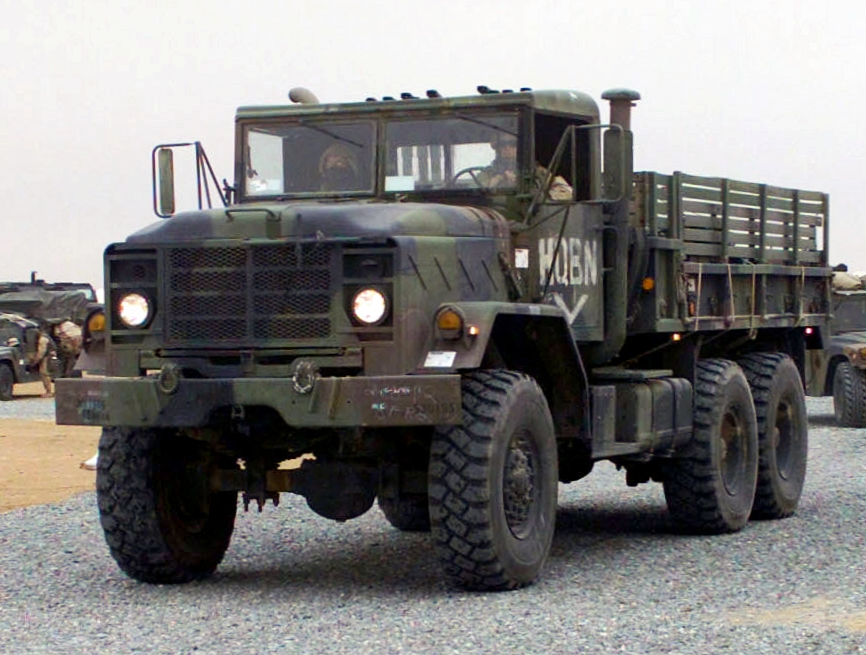
- United States Marine Corps M923A1 in 2003
- Type: 5-ton 6x6 trucks
- Place of origin: United States

Production history
- Manufacturer: AM General; Kia Motors
- Produced: 1982–1987 (AM General); 1985–present (South Korea)
- No. built: 44,590+ (AM General)

Specifications (M925A2)
- Mass: 22,030 lb (9,990 kg)
- Length: 27 ft 8 in (8.43 m)
- Width: 8 ft 1 in (2.46 m)
- Height: 10 ft 1 in (3.07 m)
- Engine: Cummins 6CTA8.3; 240 hp (180 kW)
- Transmission: 5 speed auto. x 2 range
- Suspension: Beam axles on leaf springs
- Maximum speed: 55 mph (89 km/h)

The M939 is a 5-ton 6×6 U.S. military heavy truck. The basic cargo versions were designed to transport a 10,000 pounds (4,500 kg) cargo load over all terrain in all weather. Designed in the late 1970s to replace the M39 and M809 series of trucks, it has been in service ever since. The M939 evolved into its own family of cargo trucks, dump trucks, semi-tractors, vans, wreckers, and bare chassis/cabs for specialty bodies. 44,590 in all were produced.

== History ==
In the late 1970s the M809 series 5-ton (4,536 kg) 6x6 trucks, based on a 1949 design, were becoming old and mechanically dated. It was still a useful type, with 35,000 in service. A "Product Improvement Package" was developed to rebuild and update the M809 series into the M939 series. A new cab and hood are spotting features, but there were also other improvements.

In 1982 AM General, who built all M809s, began rebuilding M809s into the M939 and M939A1 series at their South Bend, Indiana plant. They would rebuild 24,100. A follow-up model, the all-new M939A2 series, was produced by Bowen-McLaughlin-York/BMY in Marysville, Ohio. They would build 20,490. In 1991 the M939 series was replaced by the all-new design M1083-M1091 Medium Tactical Vehicles.

== Specifications ==
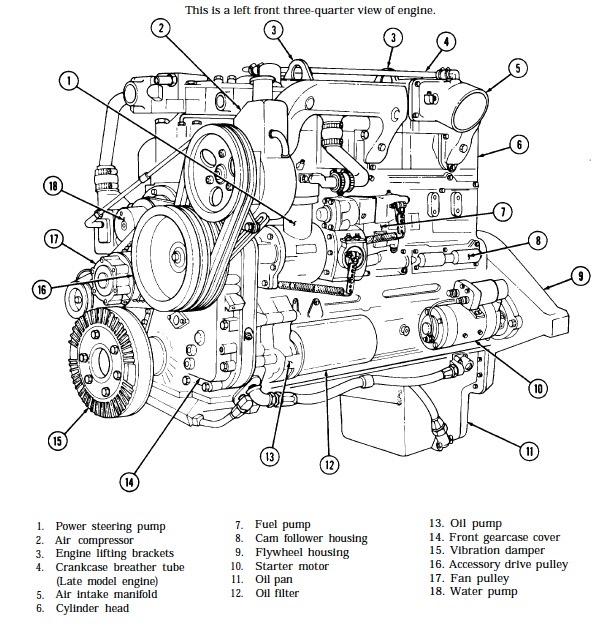
Cummins NH250 engine

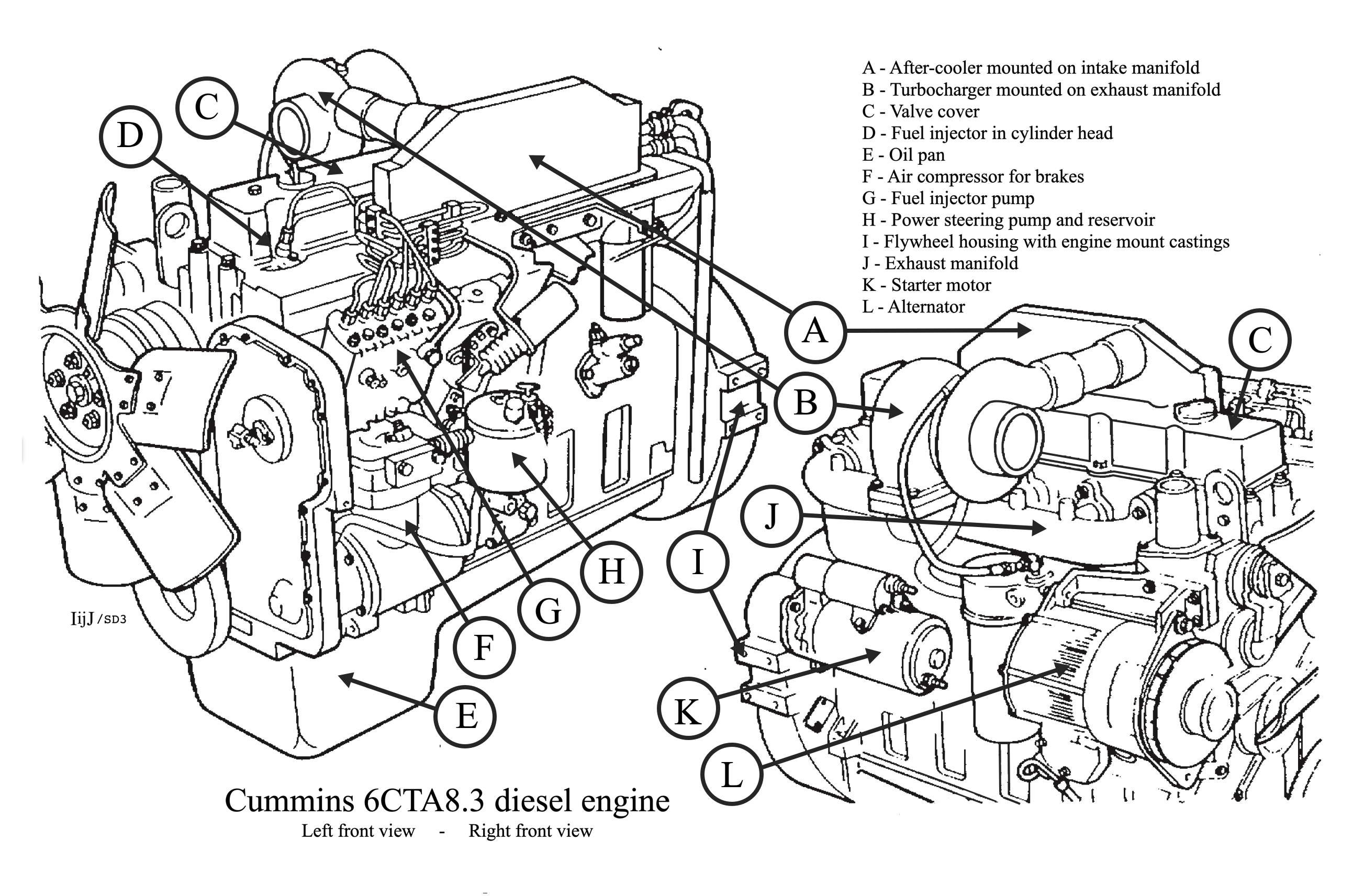
Cummins 6CTA8.3 diesel engine

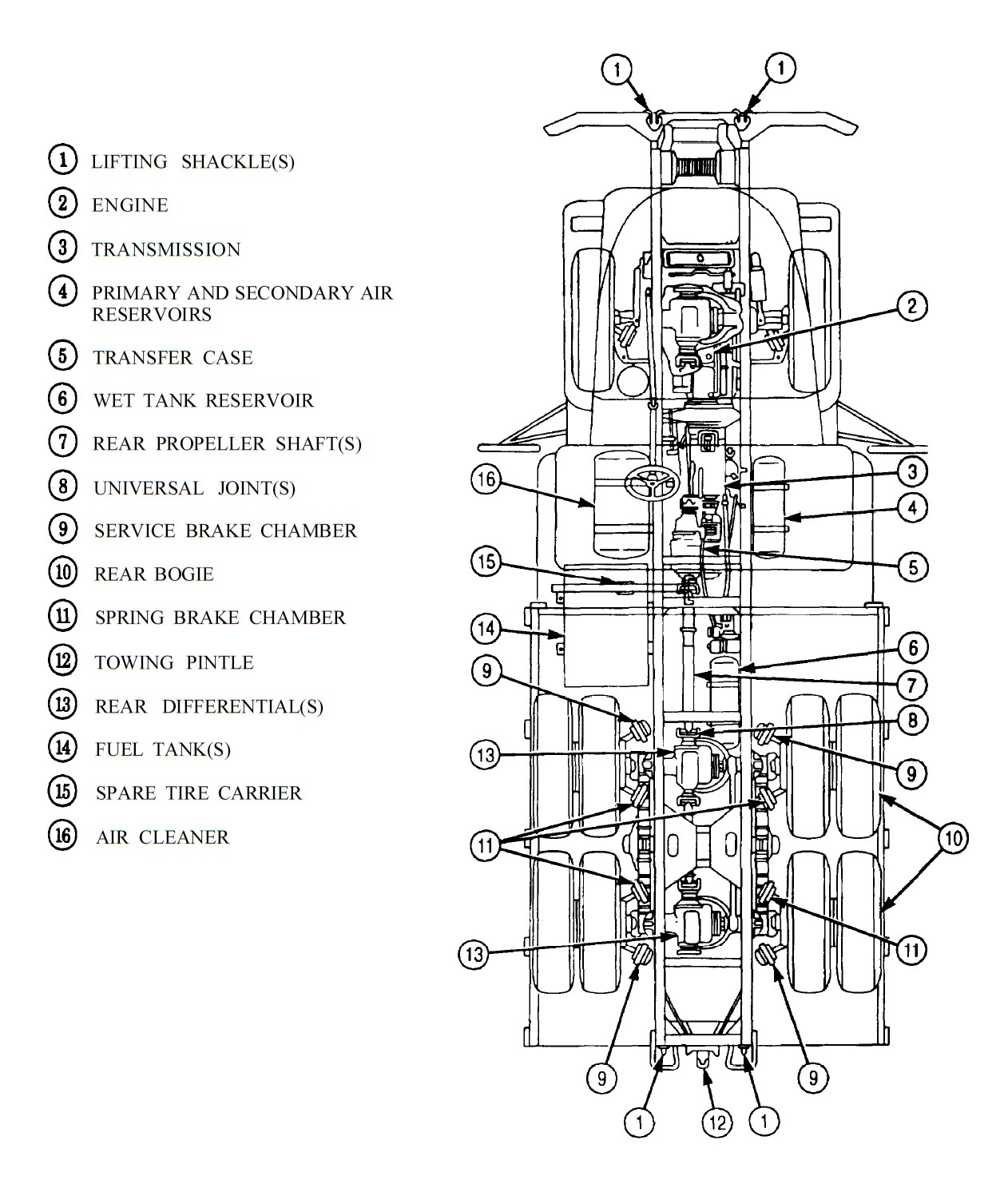
M939 chassis with dual rear tires M939A1 and A2 have single rear tires.

All models of the M939 share a common basic chassis, cab, hood, and fenders. The basic truck is a 6×6 (three axles, six wheels, all of which are powered) heavy truck. Early M939s were rebuilds of M809 vehicle chassis with a new automatic transmission, transfer cases, cab, and hood. Suffix –A2 are new production with later model Cummins engine. The vehicles have a wide variety of configurations and weights.

Note that the motor and tire specifications, along with other improvements, apply to the A2 versions (and A1 versions) of each base model listed below. There is an M928, an M928A1, and M928A2.

=== Engines ===
The M939 and M939A1 models use a Cummins NHC 250, a 855 cubic inches (14.0 L) naturally aspirated inline 6 cylinder diesel engine developing 240 horsepower (180 kW) at 2100 rpm and 685 pound force-feet (929 N⋅m) of torque at 1,500 rpm. This was the standard engine of the M809 series. The M939A2 models use a newer and smaller Cummins 6CTA8.3 504 cubic inches (8.3 L) turbocharged inline 6 cylinder diesel engine developing 240 horsepower (180 kW) at 2100 rpm and 745 pound force-feet (1,010 N⋅m) torque at 1,500 rpm.

=== Driveline ===
By 1980 fewer soldiers knew how to shift manual transmissions and heavy-duty automatic transmissions had matured so the M809's manual was replaced with an Allison MT654CR 5-speed automatic. This is easier to drive, shifts better, and has less shock to the chassis than a manual transmission.

The M809 had an unusual 2-speed transfer case that engaged the front axle automatically, a more modern and conventional model was used. It could shift between low and high ranges while moving. In the low range the front axle is automatically engaged, in the high range the driver controls it.

The M809 series used Rockwell-Standard double-reduction axles with a 6.44:1 ratio. New production M939A2 use a similar Meritor model, also with a 6.44:1 ratio. Steering boxes and some other components have also changed. Entire components are interchangeable but the component parts are different.

=== Chassis ===
A ladder frame with three beam axles, the front on leaf springs, the rear tandem on leaf springs with locating arms, was used.

The M939 series uses 11:00 R20 tires with two tires per side per axle in the rear (rear tandem duals). This allows a heavy load to be carried on improved roads and most US trucks in the past have used them. The M939A1 and M939A2 series instead use oversized 14:00 R20 tires with a single tire on each side per axle, still with a tandem setup. Single, larger tires in a line (having the same track) work better and get stuck less often on soft ground. M939A2 series vehicles use a central tire inflation system (CTIS).

There are three wheelbases (measurements are from the centerline of the front axle to the centerline of the rear tandem). The short, used for tractors and dump trucks, is 13 feet 11 inches (4.24 m), the long ("standard"), used for cargo trucks and wreckers, is 14 feet 11 inches (4.55 m), and the extra-long, used for long cargo trucks and expansible vans, is 17 feet 11 inches (5.46 m).

The M809 series had an unusual air-over-hydraulic braking system, The M939 series have a commercial type air-brake system modified for military service.

== Models ==
=== Cargo Truck M923-M928 ===
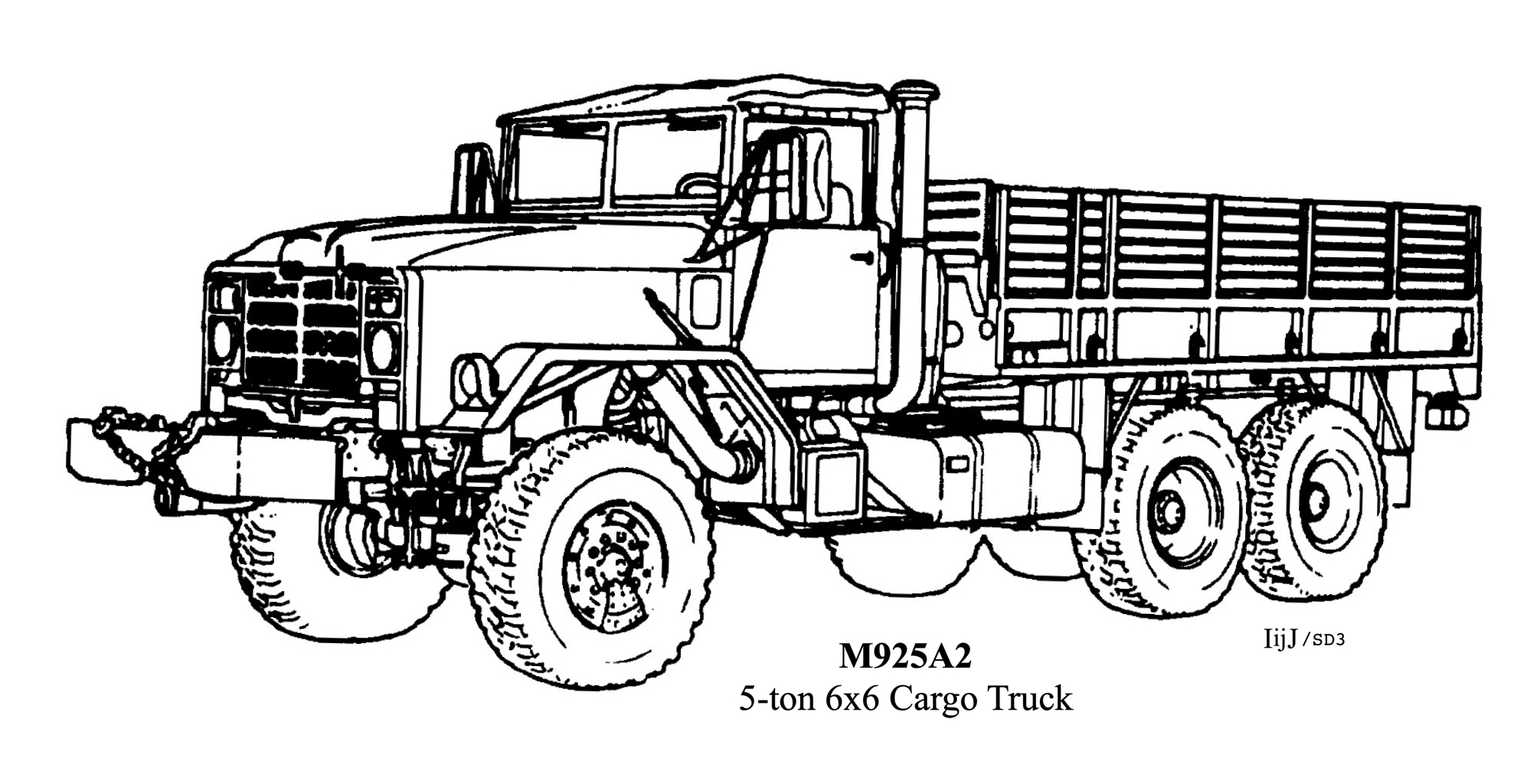
M925A2 Dropside cargo truck

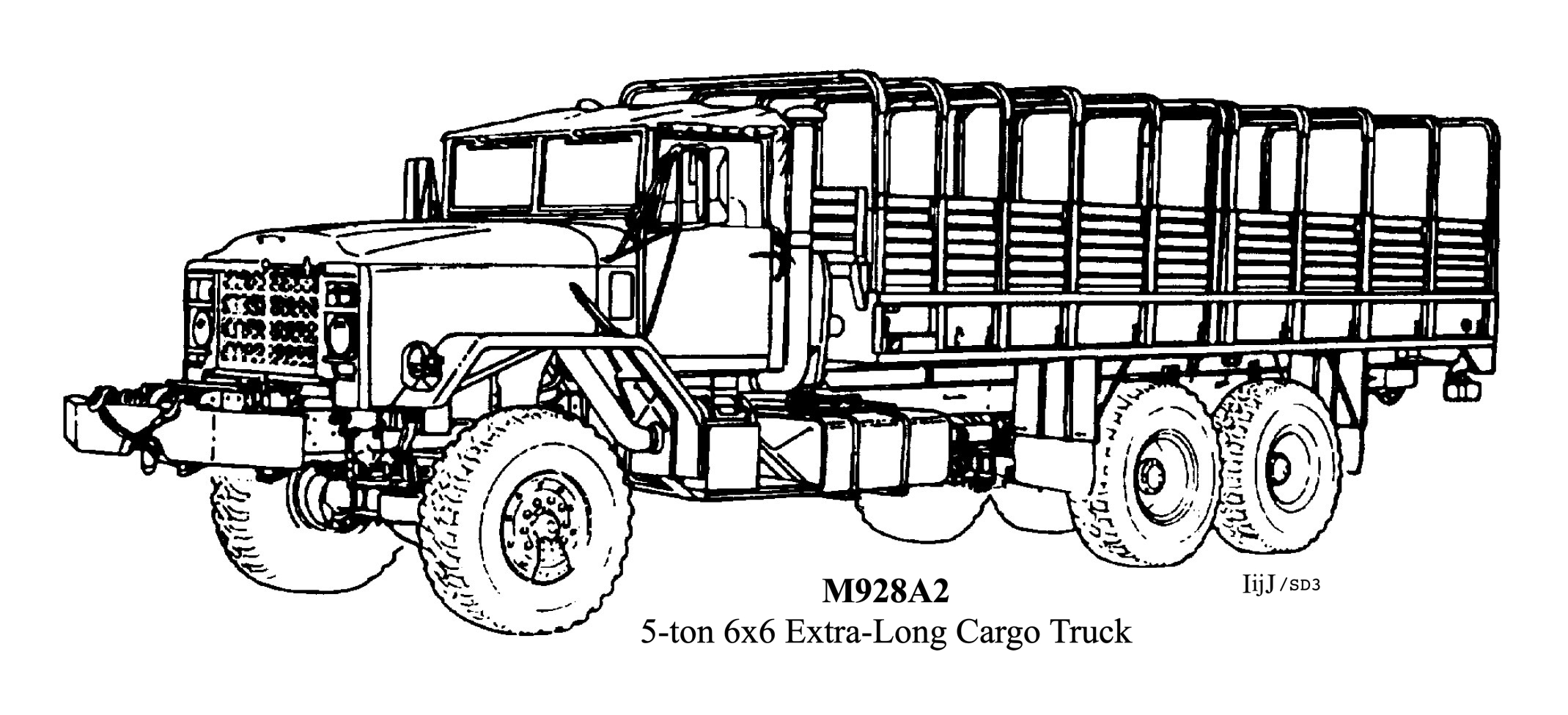
M928A2 Long cargo truck

The M923 (M925 w/winch) was the standard cargo version of the series. It had a 14 by 7 feet (4.3 m × 2.1 m) body with drop sides so it could be loaded from the side by forklifts. It had a bottom hinged tailgate. Side racks, troop seats, and overhead bows with a canvas cover were standard.

The M927 (M928 w/winch), with an extra long wheelbase, had a 20 by 7 feet (6.1 m × 2.1 m) long box. There was no drop side version. Side racks and overhead bows with a canvas cover were standard but no troop seats were fitted.

=== Dump Truck M929/M930 ===
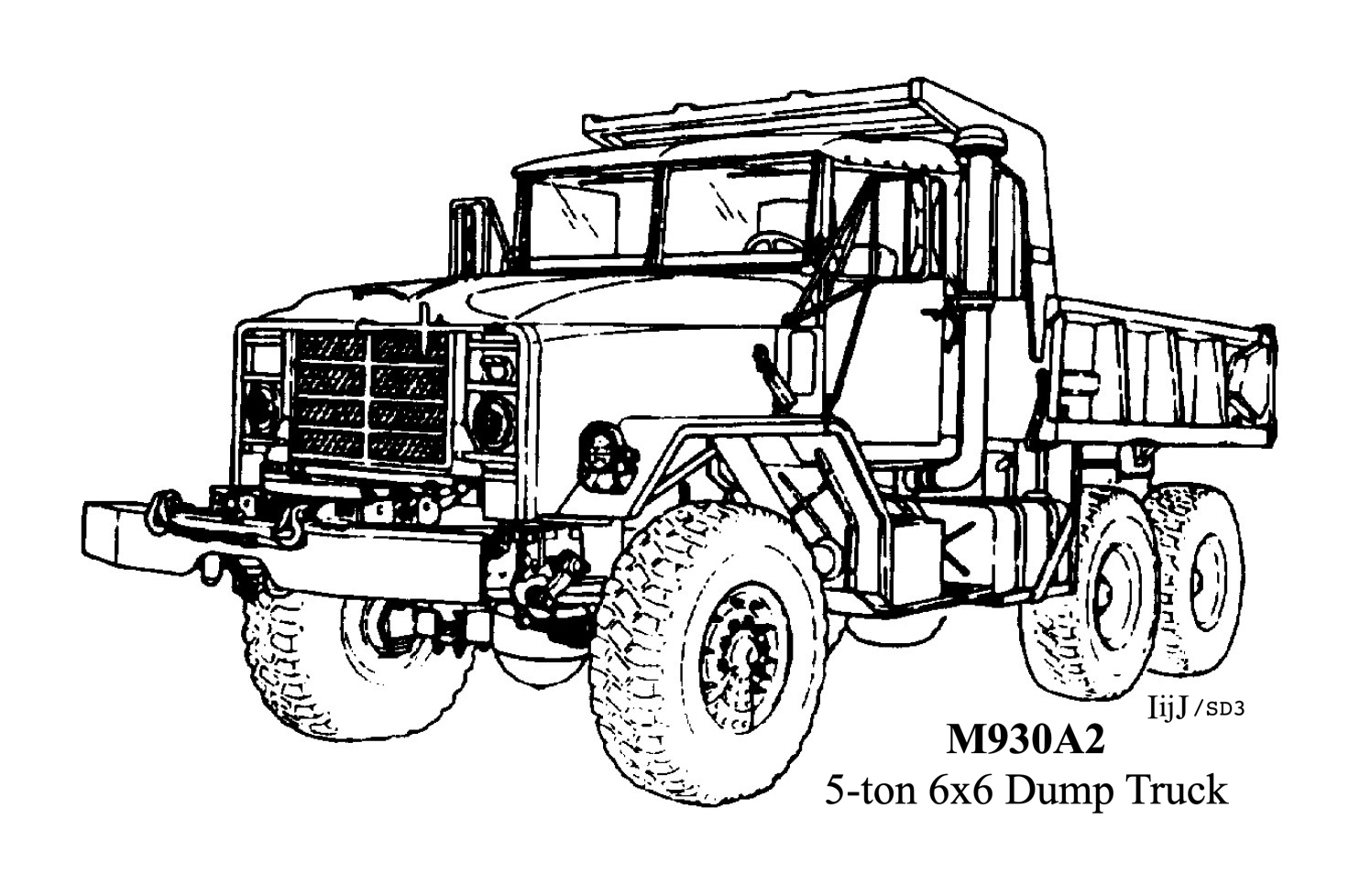
M930A2 Dump truck

The M929 (M930 w/winch) was a dump truck used to haul sand, gravel, dirt, rubble, scrap, and other bulk materials. It had a dump body with cab protector and a tailgate that could hinge at either the top or bottom. They could be equipped with overhead bows, tarpaulin, and troop seats, but the relatively small size of the body limited their passenger or cargo load.

=== Tractor Truck M931/M932 ===
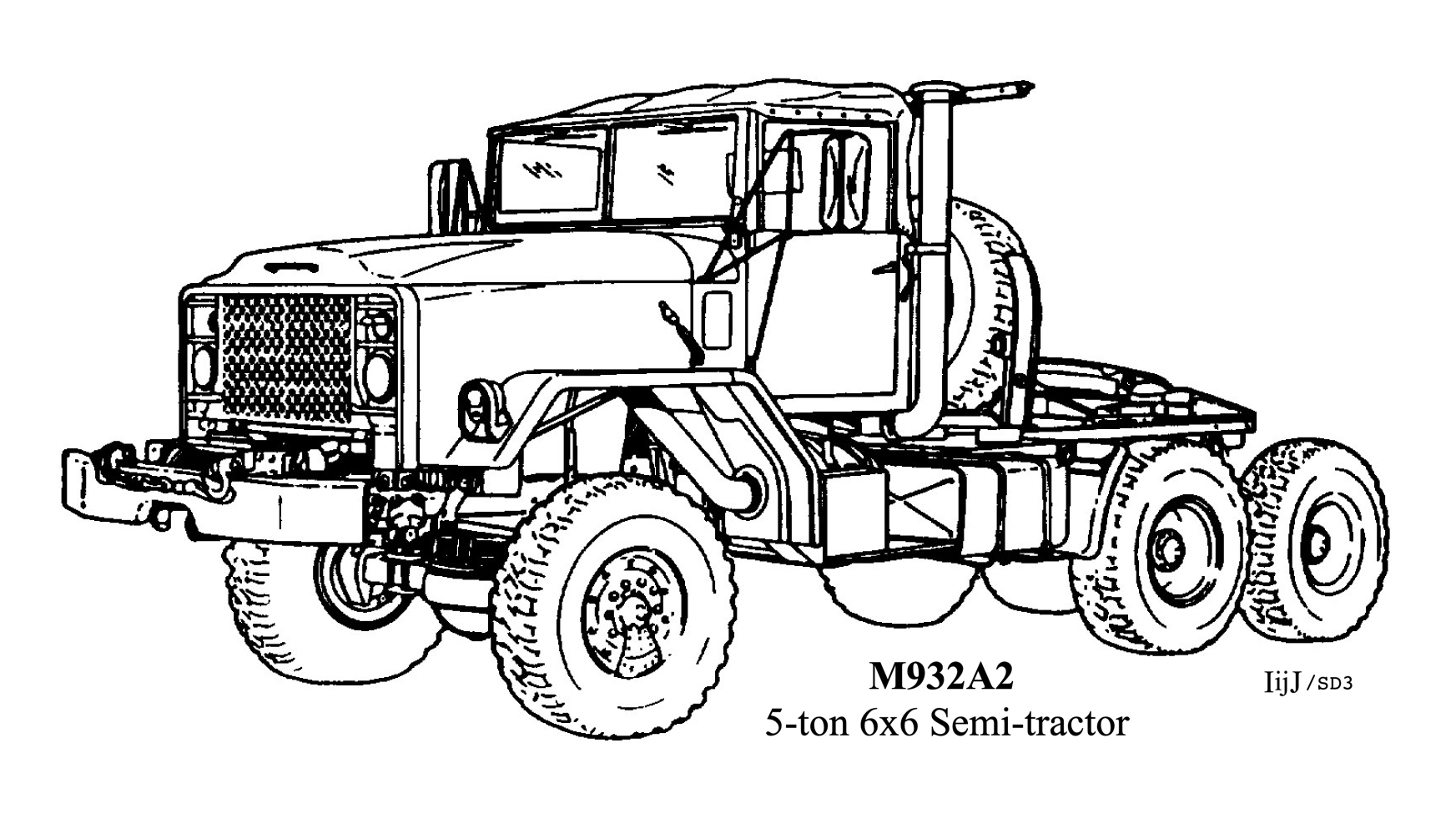
M932A2 Semi-tractor

The M931 (M932 w/winch) was a semi-tractor used to tow semi-trailers up to 37,500 pounds (17,000 kg). A front-mounted winch was optional. Unlike commercial trucks the fifth-wheel could also pivot side to side, making a more flexible connection to the trailer. Even so, off-road performance was limited.

=== Expansible Van M934/M935 ===
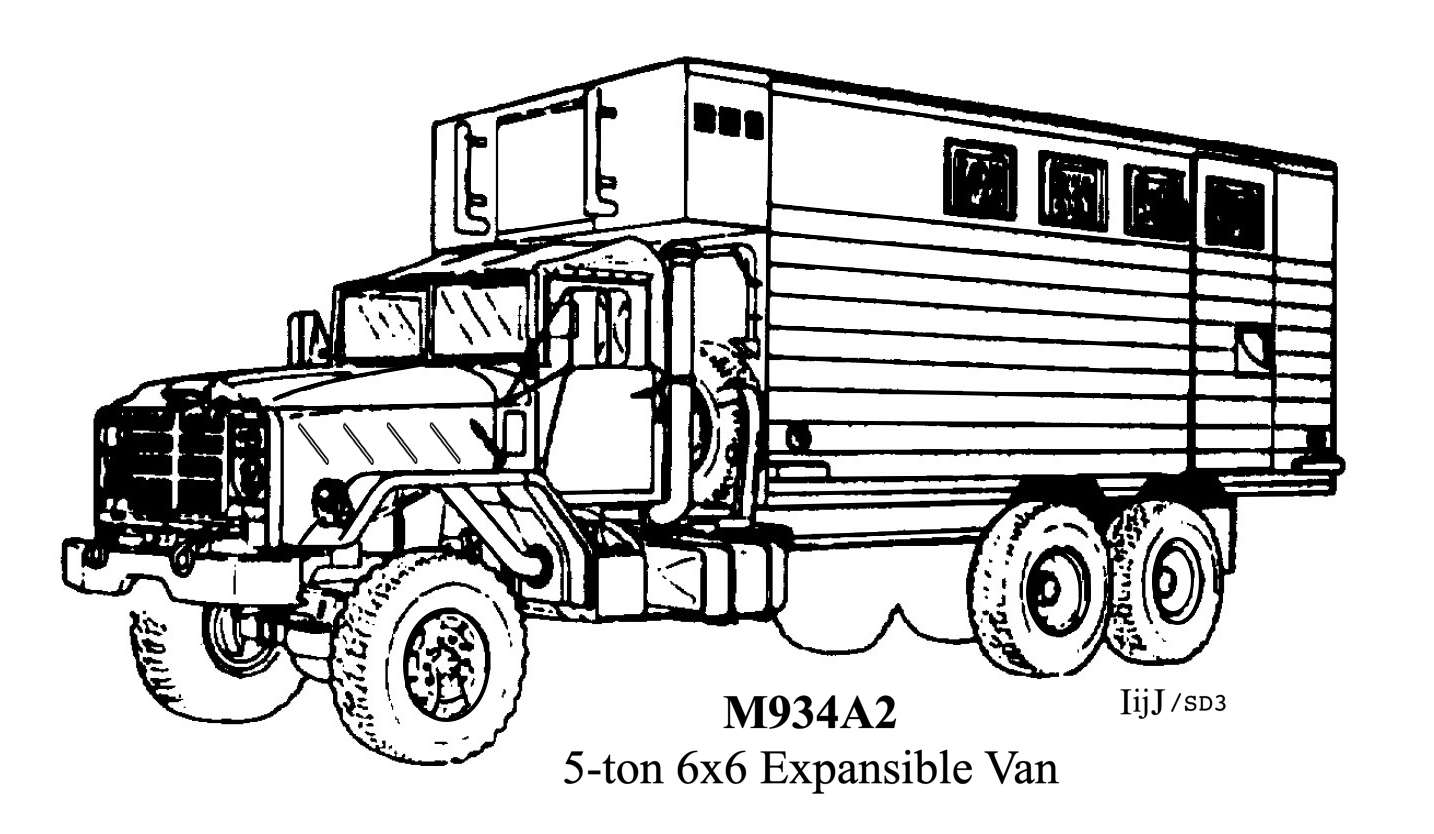
M934 Expansible van

The M934 (M935 with a hydraulic lift-gate) had a 17 ft (5.2 m) van body with a slide out section on each side. When the sections are extended the working floor was over 12 ft (3.7 m) wide. The body could support 5,000 lb (2,300 kg) of communications equipment.

=== Medium Wrecker M936 ===
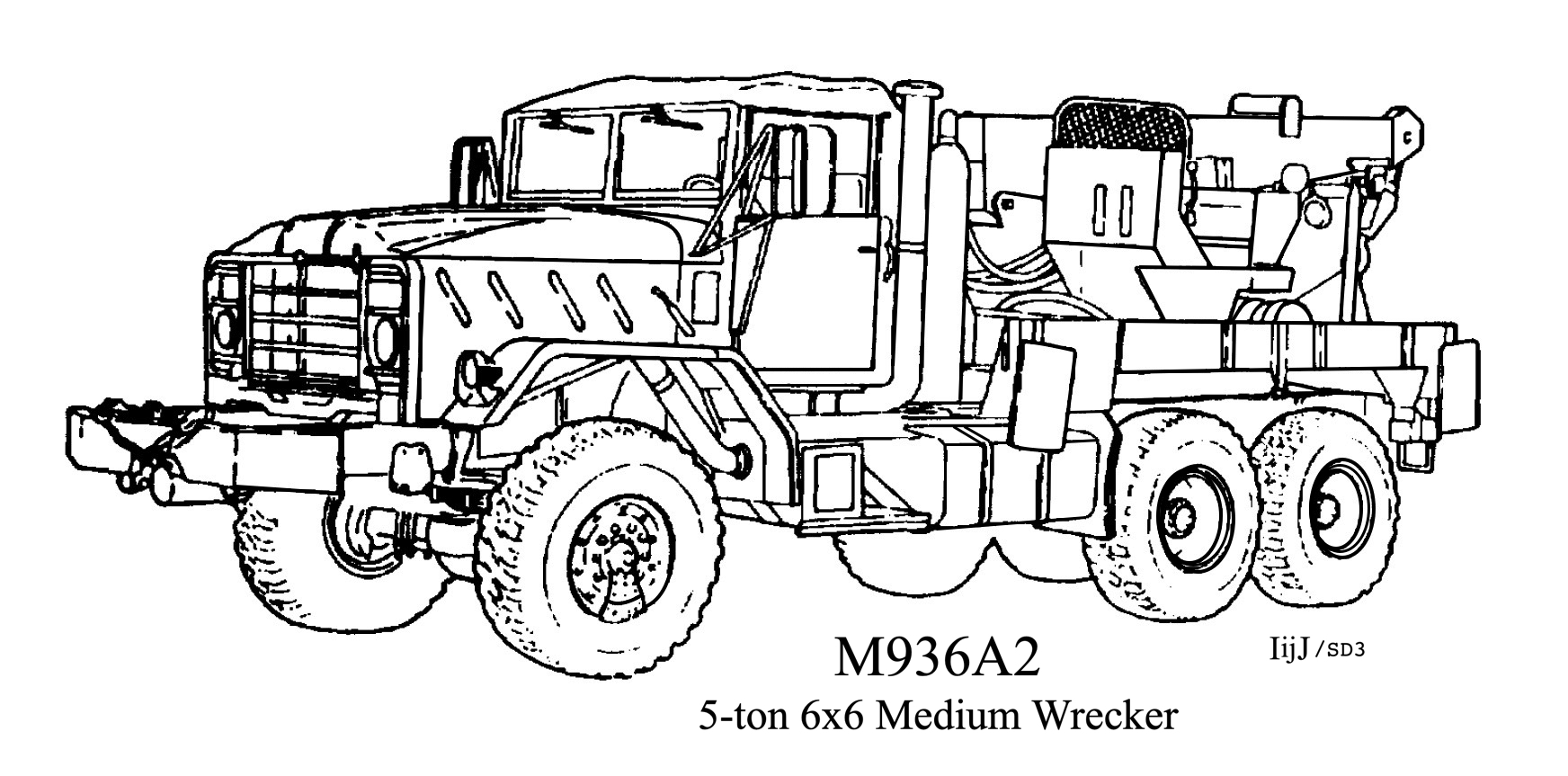
M936A2 Medium wrecker

The M936 was a wrecker used to recover disabled or stuck trucks and lift large components. A rotating, telescoping, and elevating hydraulic boom could lift a maximum of 20,000 pounds (9,100 kg). Although the truck was not meant to carry a load, the boom could support 7,000 pounds (3,200 kg) when towing. They had 20,000 pounds (9,100 kg) front and 45,000 pounds (20,000 kg) rear winches, outriggers, boom braces, and special extra-heavy duty rear springs for stability. Chains, chocks, block and tackle, oxygen-acetylene torches, and other automotive tools were carried.

=== Chassis-cabs ===
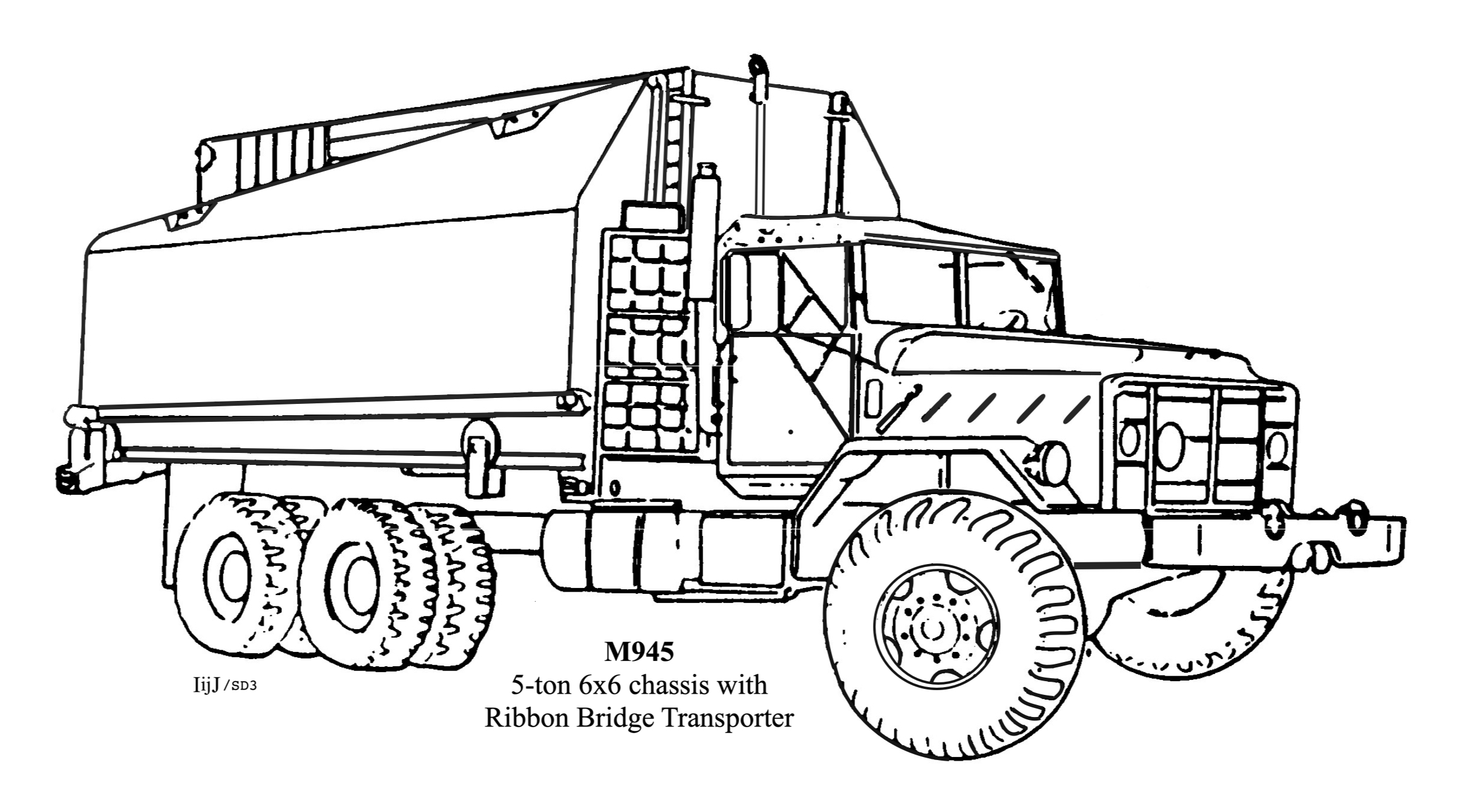
M945 Ribbon Bridge transporter

The M939 to M945 were chassis with cabs, meant to carry specialized bodies. They were available in long and extra long wheelbases, and with or without front winches. The largest was the M945 used to mount the so-called "Bat Wing" body Shop Equipment Organizational Repair Truck Mounted (SEORTM), the Antenna Mast section of Patriot Missile Batteries, and with oversized 14:00 R20 tires as a transporter to carry and launch Improved Ribbon Bridge sections and Bridge Erection Boats.

== Dimensions ==
Model (-A2)	Wheelbase	Length	Width	Height	Empty Weight
M923 Cargo	long	25 ft 11 in (7.90 m)	8 ft (2.44 m)	9 ft 11 in (3.02 m) (Note: Reducible to 7 ft 9 in (2.36 m).)	20,930 lb (9,490 kg)
M925 Cargo	long	27 ft 8 in (8.43 m)	8 ft (2.44 m)	9 ft 11 in (3.02 m)	22,030 lb (9,990 kg)
M927 Cargo	extra long	32 ft 1.5 in (9.79 m)	8 ft (2.44 m)	10 ft 1 in (3.07 m)	23,790 lb (10,790 kg)
M928 Cargo	extra long	34 ft (10.36 m)	8 ft 2 in (2.49 m)	10 ft 1 in (3.07 m)	24,890 lb (11,290 kg)
M929 Dump	short	22 ft 11 in (6.99 m)	7 ft 11 in (2.41 m)	10 ft 5 in (3.18 m) (Note: Reducible to 7 ft 1 in (2.16 m) with cab shield removed.)	23,820 lb (10,800 kg)
M930 Dump	short	24 ft 6.5 in (7.48 m)	7 ft 11 in (2.41 m)	10 ft 5 in (3.18 m)	24,920 lb (11,300 kg)
M931 Tractor	short	22 ft .5 in (6.72 m)	8 ft 1.4 in (2.47 m)	9 ft 6.9 in (2.92 m)	19,895 lb (9,024 kg)
M932 Tractor	short	23 ft 10 in (7.26 m)	8 ft 1.4 in (2.47 m)	9 ft 6.9 in (2.92 m)	20,995 lb (9,523 kg)
M934 Expansible van	extra long	30 ft 2.6 in (9.21 m)	8 ft 2 in (2.49 m) (Note: 13 ft 11 in (4.24 m) when expanded.)	11 ft 6 in (3.51 m)	28,035 lb (12,716 kg)
M936 Wrecker	long	30 ft 2 in (9.19 m)	8 ft 1 in (2.46 m)	10 ft (3.05 m) (Note: Reducible to 9 ft (2.74 m).)	36,910 lb (16,740 kg)
M945 Bridge transporter	extra long	31 ft 4 in (9.55 m)	11 ft 3 in (3.43 m)	9 ft 10 in (3.00 m) (Note: 17 ft 4 in (5.28 m) loaded with ramp bay float.)	27,400 pounds (12,400 kg)

== Gallery ==
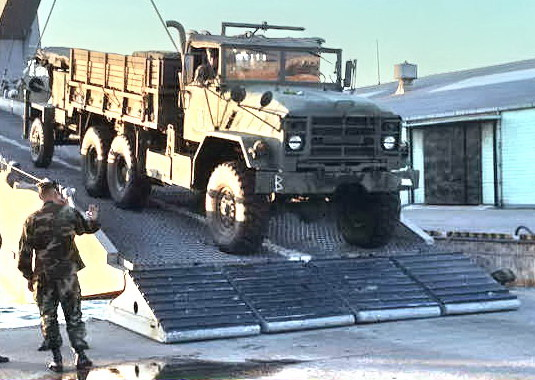
M923A1 Cargo truck

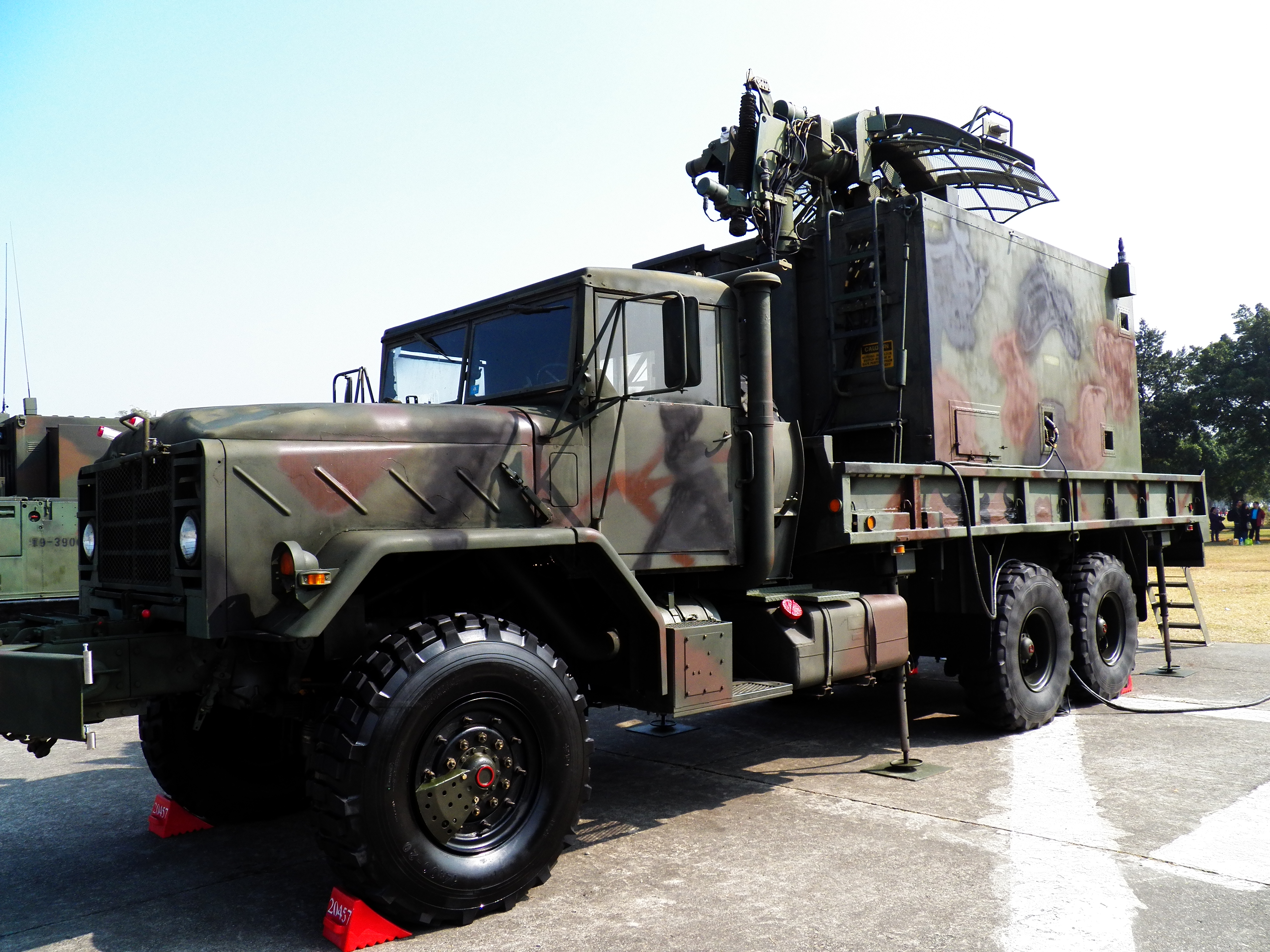
M928A2 Long cargo truck
(note CTIS on front axle)

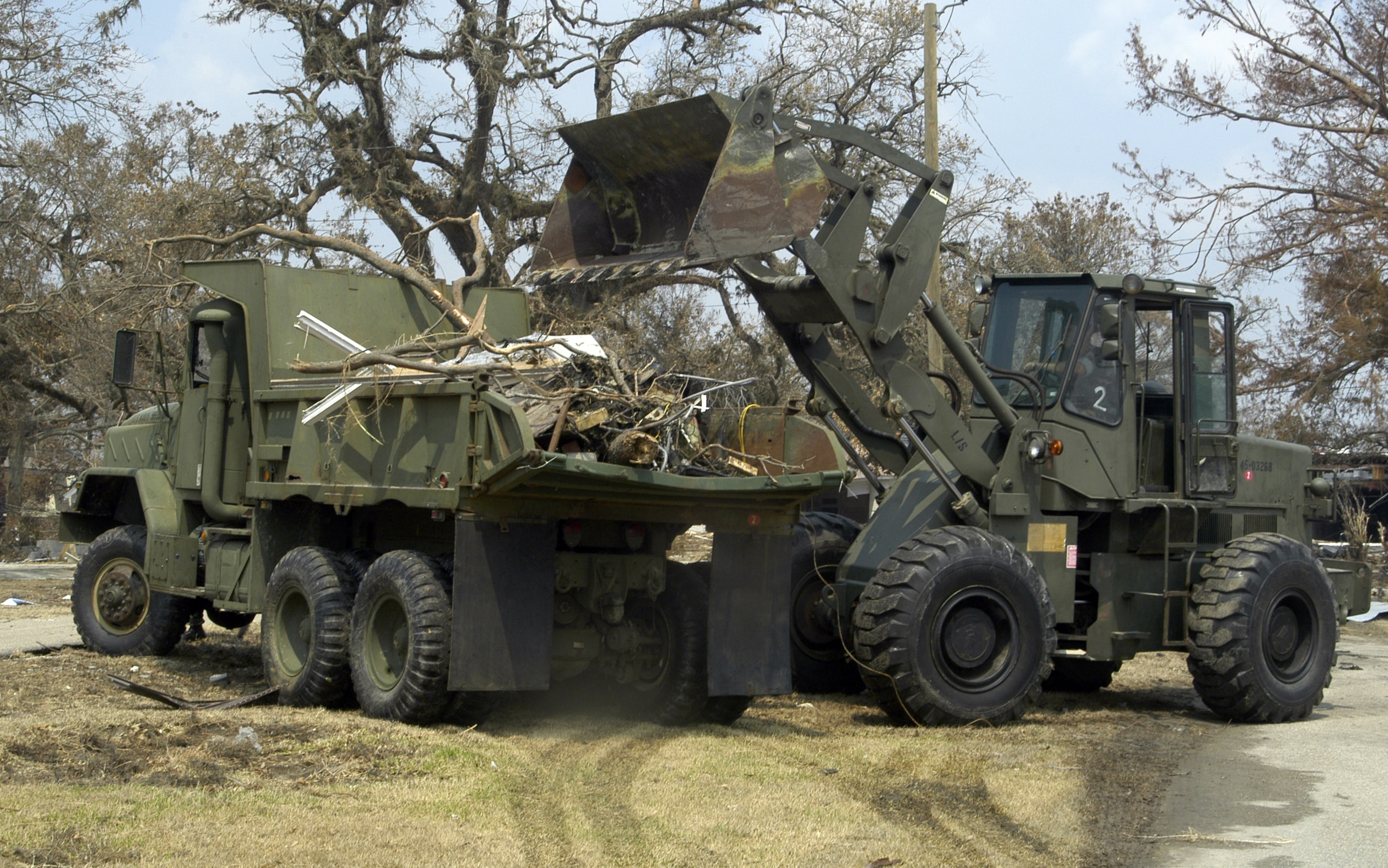
M929 Dump truck

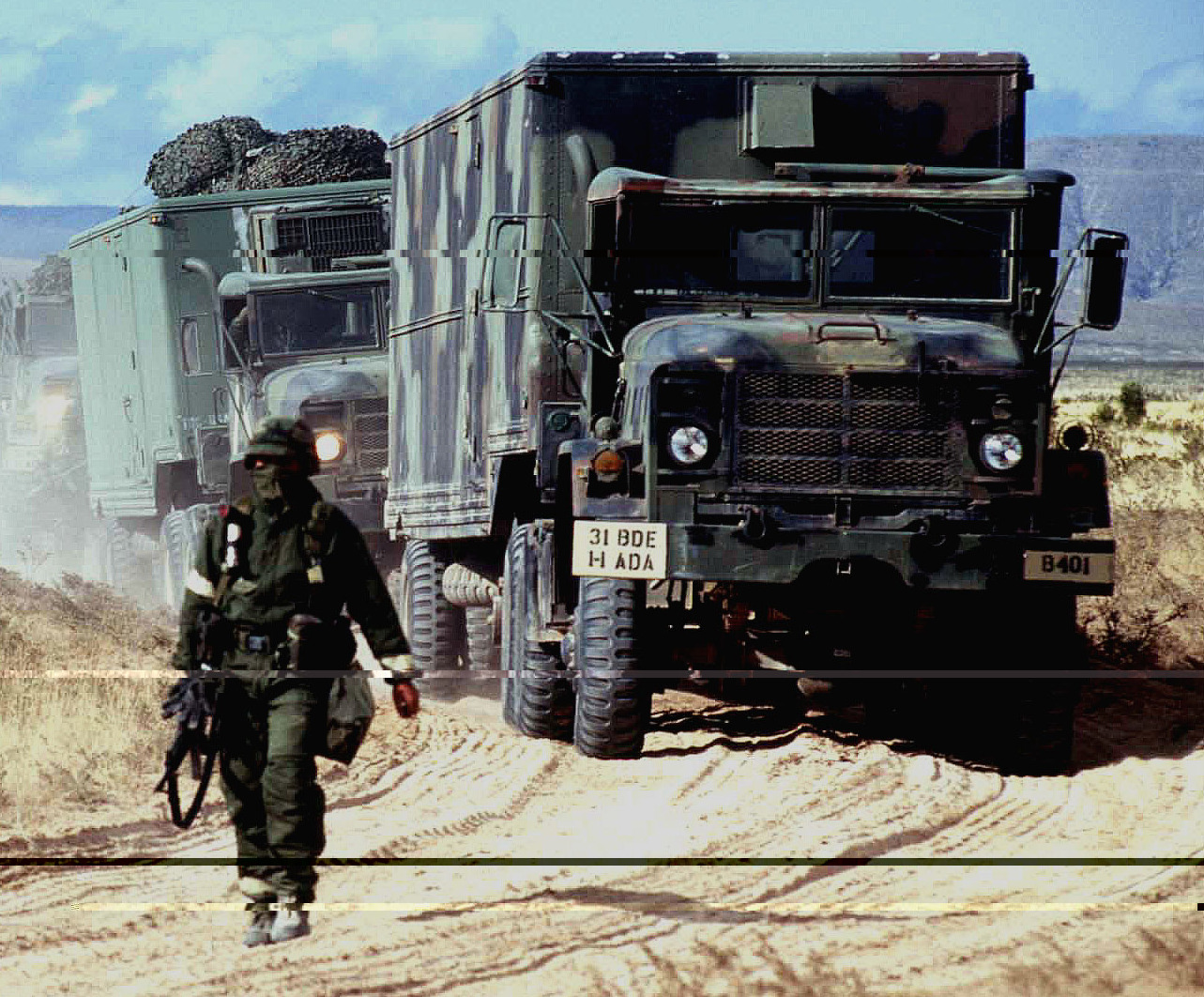
M931 Semi-tractors

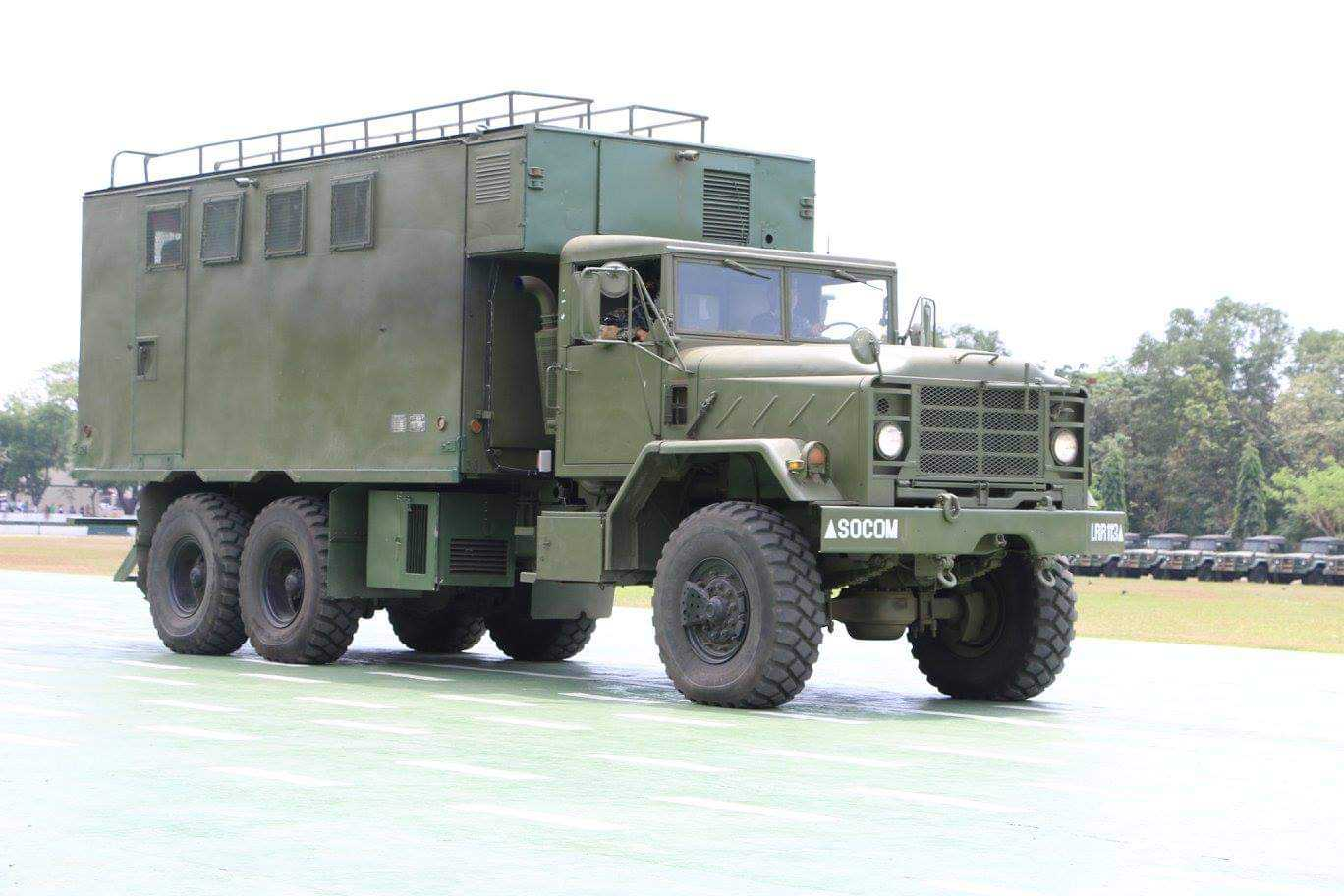
M934 Expansible van

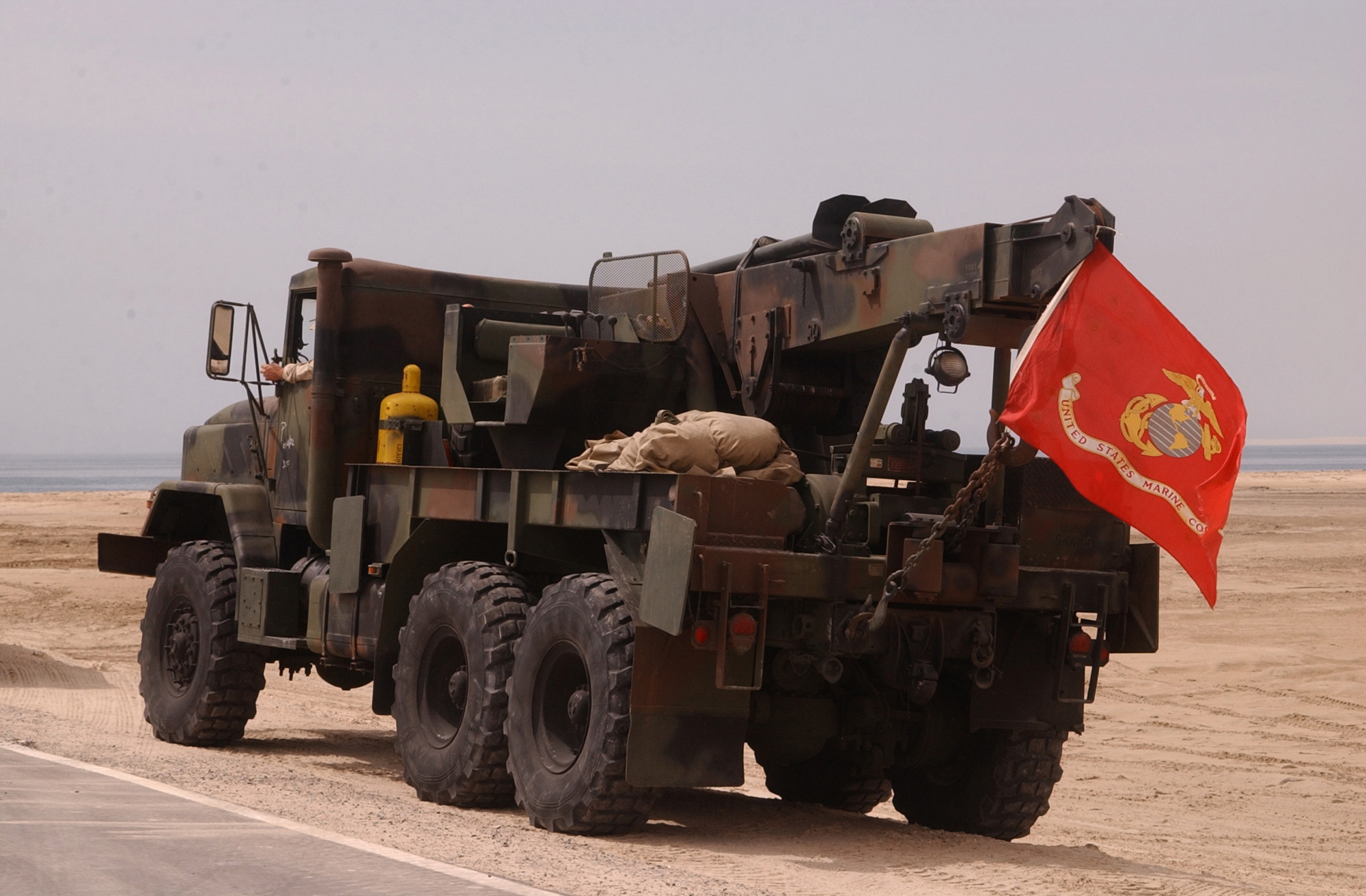
M936A1 Medium wrecker

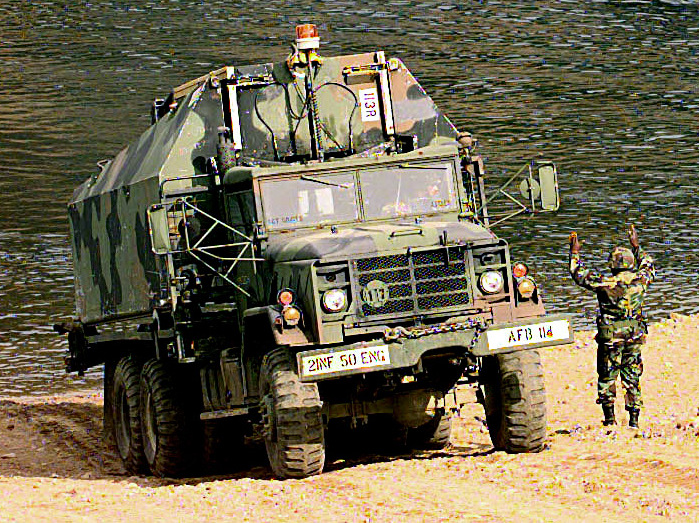
M945 w/bridge transporter

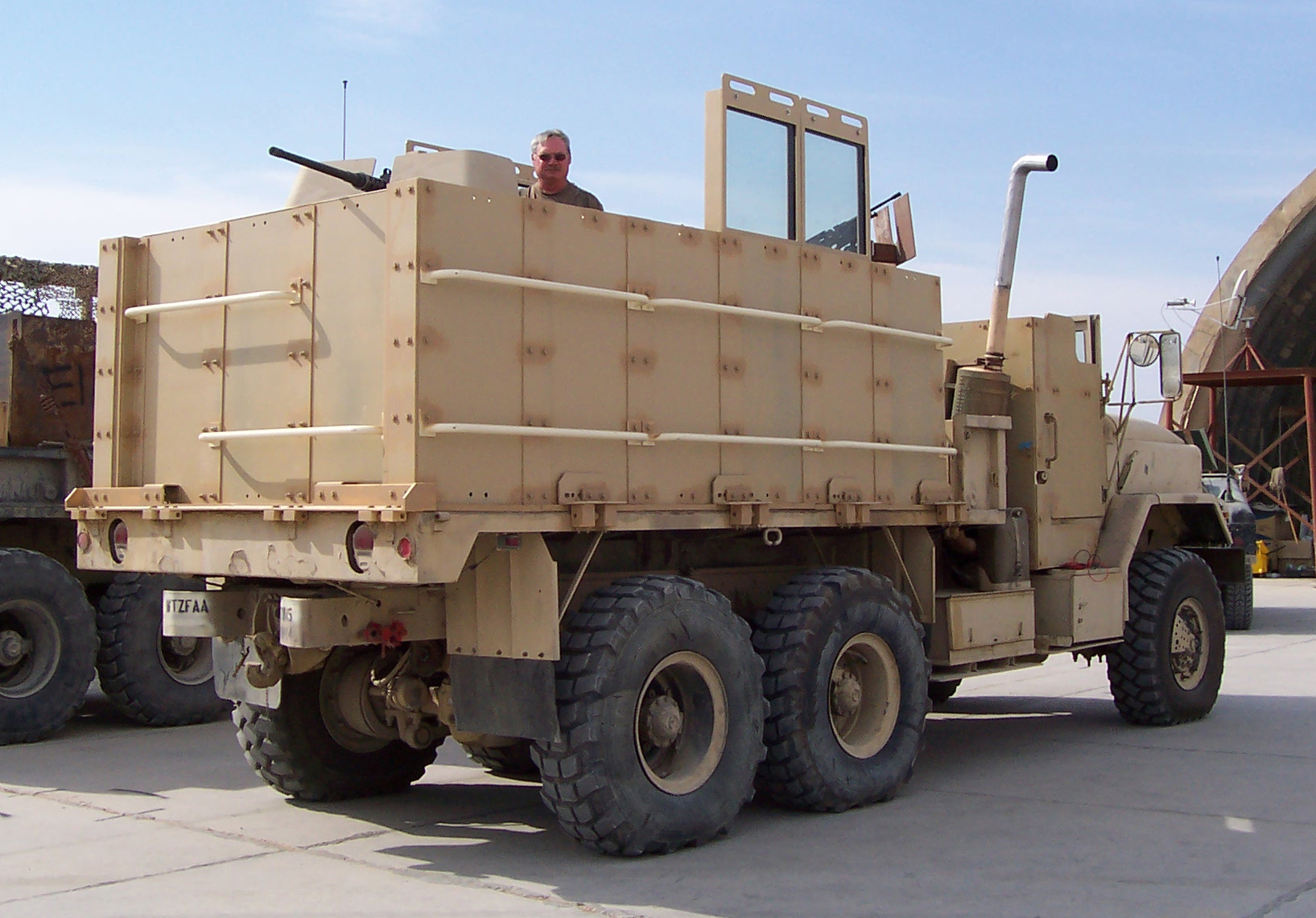
M923A1 gun truck

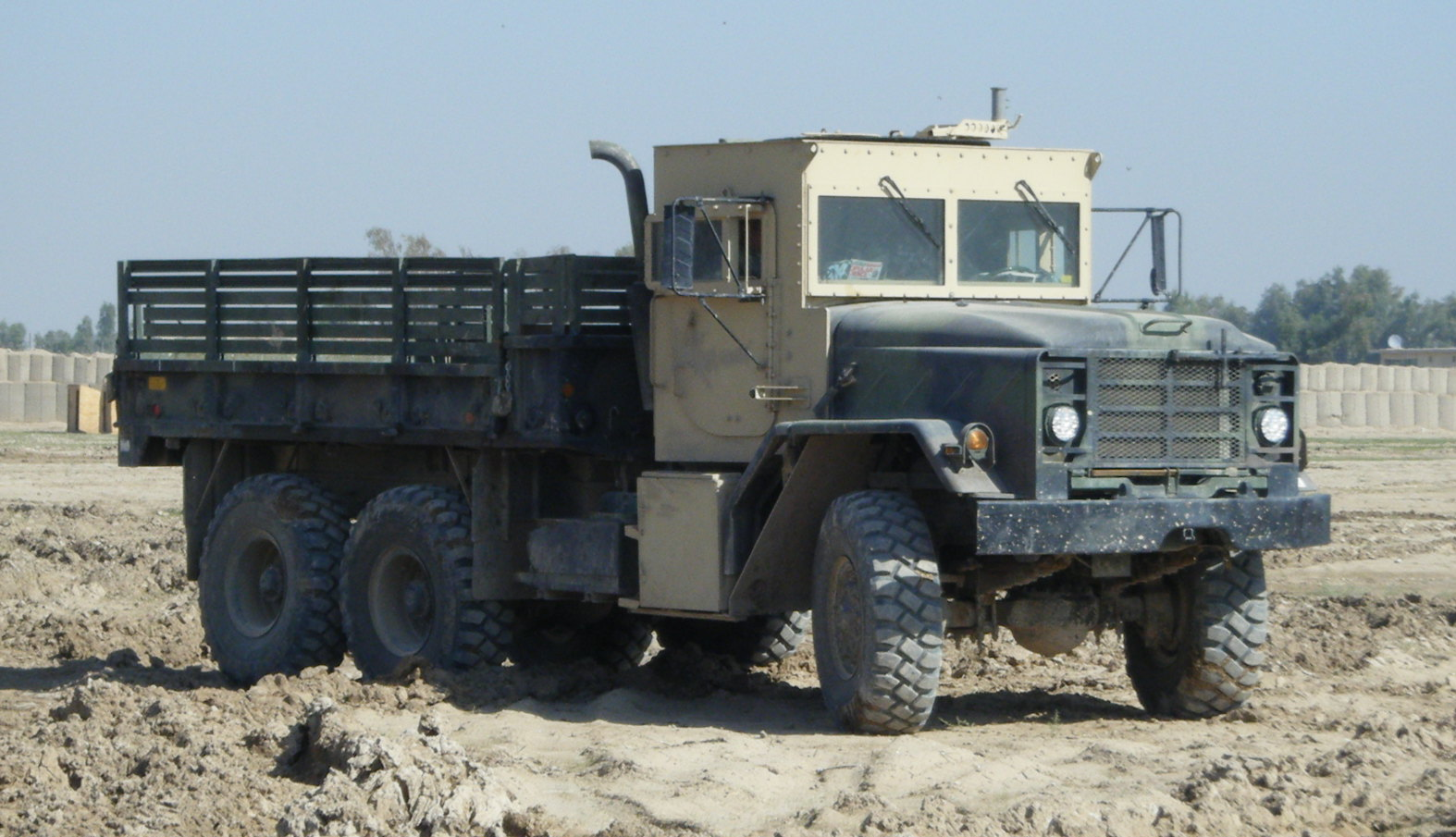
M923A1 w/armored cab

== Operators ==
- United States
- Argentina
- Colombia
- Ecuador
- Egypt
- Indonesia
- Iraq
- Saudi Arabia
- Lebanon
- Morocco
- Mexico
- Malaysia
- Philippines
- Taiwan
- Thailand
- Somalia
- Turkey
- Ukraine

== Safety ==
The safety of the M939 series of trucks has been criticized, especially braking performance and stability when loaded. In 1999 the U.S. Army began retrofitting anti-lock brake systems to the M939 trucks. Until the trucks were modified, they were limited to a 40 mph (65 km/h) top speed by an Army-wide safety order.

Prior to that improvement, 26% of all Army vehicle accidents and 53% of all Army vehicle accident fatalities were in M939 series trucks. From 1987 to 1998 the series made up 9% of the total U.S. Army vehicle inventory, but accounted for 34% of all fatal accidents.

The problem seemed to be that the torque converter would "lock up" in 2nd gear, and would not unlock easily. When the driver attempted to brake hard, often in a sudden or 'panic' stop, and accidentally locked the brakes (no wheel movement, tires skidding), this would kill the engine; this also killed the power steering, and the driver would suddenly be unable to steer. Too often, the truck would veer sideways and either hit something or roll over.

== See also ==
- Heavy Expanded Mobility Tactical Truck (HEMTT)
- Palletized Load System (PLS)
- M54 5-ton 6x6 truck
- M809 series 5-ton 6x6 truck
- Medium Tactical Vehicle Replacement (MTVR)
- Ural-4320 Soviet/Russian counterparts
