= M809 series 5-ton 6×6 truck =

M809 Series 5-ton 6x6 Truck
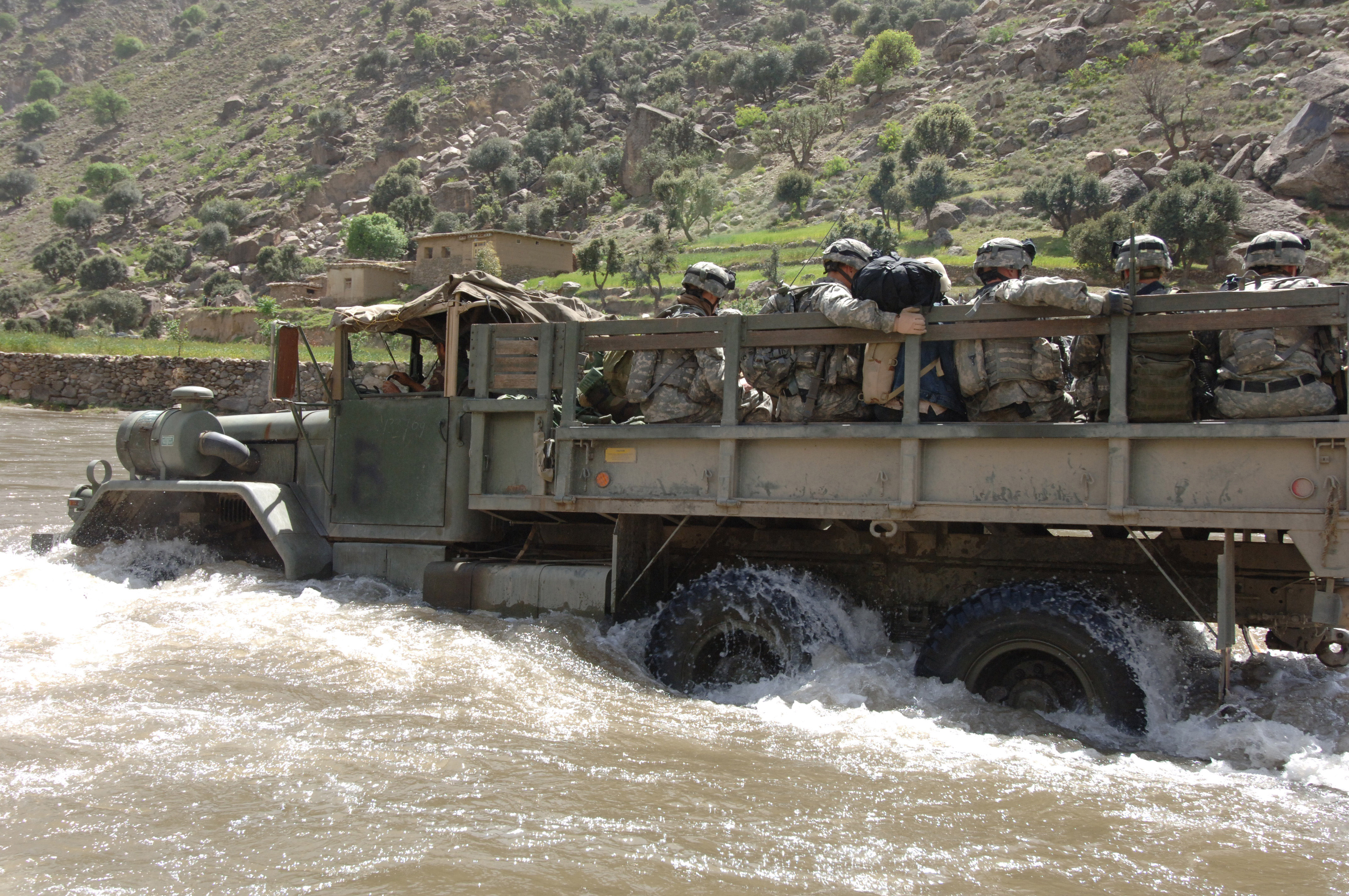
- M813 crossing a river
- Type: 5-ton 6x6 trucks
- Place of origin: United States

Production history
- Manufacturer: AM General
- Produced: 1970–1982

Specifications (M813 with winch)
- Mass: 21,020 lb (9,530 kg) (empty)
- Length: 26 ft 7 in (8.10 m)
- Width: 8 ft 2 in (2.49 m)
- Height: 9 ft 9 in (2.97 m)
- Engine: Cummins NH250; 240 hp (180 kW)
- Transmission: 5 speed x 2 range
- Suspension: Live beam axles on leaf springs
- Operational range: 350 mi (563.3 km)
- Maximum speed: 52 mph (84 km/h)

The M809 Series 5-ton 6x6 truck (G908) was a family of heavy tactical trucks built for the United States Armed Forces. The basic cargo version was designed to transport a 5-ton (4,500 kg), 14 ft (4.3 m) long load over all terrain in all weather. In on-road service the load weight was doubled. Built by AM General, they evolved into the M939 Series.

== History ==
In the late 1960s the US Army needed more 5-ton (4,536 kg) 6x6 trucks. AM General developed an updated version of the M39 series, in service since 1951. The primary difference was the engine and transmission. The hood and grille were lengthened to make room for the larger engine and the lighting system was updated to meet new US safety regulations. All had an air cleaner on the left fender, a way to tell them from the earlier M39 series.

AM General built all M809s between 1970 and 1982. The M809 Series was then improved into the M939 series in 1982. The first 11,000 M939s were rebuilds of M809s.

== Specifications ==
=== Engine and driveline ===
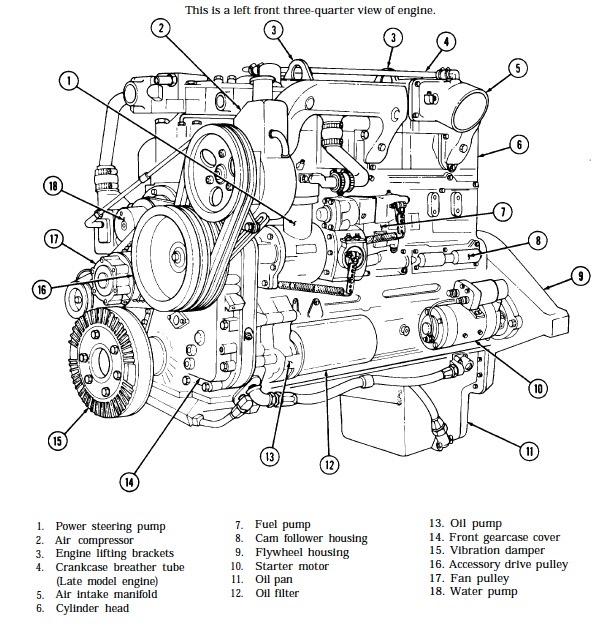
Cummins NH250 engine

The M809 series used a Cummins NHC250 engine, a 855 cu in (14.0 L) naturally aspirated inline 6 cylinder diesel engine developing 240 hp (180 kW) at 2100rpm and 685 lbf⋅ft (929 N⋅m) of torque at 1500rpm. All models of the M809 series used this engine throughout their service life. The N series was a successful commercial design, with a conservative rating the engine was more powerful and less stressed than the Continental LDS-465 multifuel engine used in the M39 series.

A Dana-Spicer 5-speed model 6453 synchromesh manual transmission had a very low 1st, direct 4th, and overdrive 5th. A Rockwell-Standard 2-speed transfer case also engaged the front axle automatically if the rear wheels turned faster than the front, as when the rear wheels spun, in any gear and any range.

=== Chassis ===
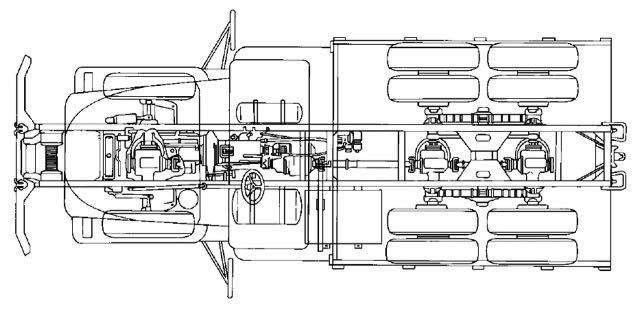

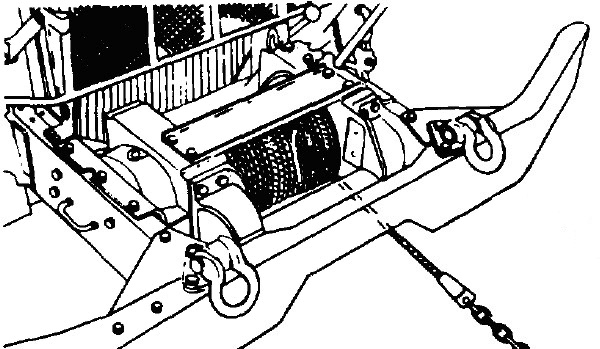
Front-mounted winch

The M809 series had a ladder frame with three live axles, the front on leaf springs and the rear tandem on leaf springs with locating arms.

There were three wheelbases (measurements are from the centerline of the front axle to the centerline of rear tandem). The short (M810), used for tractors and dumps, was 167 inches (4.24 m), the standard long (M809), used for cargo, wreckers, and bolsters, was 179 inches (4.55 m), and the extra long (M811), used for long cargo, tractor wreckers, and expansible vans, was 215 inches (5.46 m).

Most models had 11.00x20 size tires with dual rear tires. Some M813s had 14.00x20 with single rear tires, the M812 and M821 bridge trucks had 14.00x20 with dual rear tires. The M819 wrecker tractor had 12.00x20 with dual rear tires. All tires were bi-directional military pattern.

Brakes were air over hydraulic with drum brakes on all wheels. Air brake connections at the rear were used for trailer brakes. The M815, M818, and M819 had separate controls to apply the trailer brakes separately from the service brakes.

All M809 models had a rear pintle hitch and could tow 15,000 lb (6,800 kg) trailers except the M816, which could tow 20,000 lb (9,100 kg) The M818 and M819 could tow 37,500 lb (17,000 kg) semi trailers on their fifth wheel.

Many M809 series were equipped with a front-mounted 20,000 lb (9,100 kg) capacity winch, intended for self-recovery. A winch weighed 665 lb (302 kg) and added 15 1/2 in (39 cm) inches to the length of the truck. The M815 had a mid-mounted winch and the M816 had a rear-mounted 45,000 lb (20,000 kg) capacity winch.

A standard military cab, designed by REO for their 2 1/2-ton M35, was used. It had hinged doors with roll-up windows, a folding windshield, and a removable canvas roof. A hard roof could be fitted.

== Models ==
=== M813 & M814 Cargo trucks ===
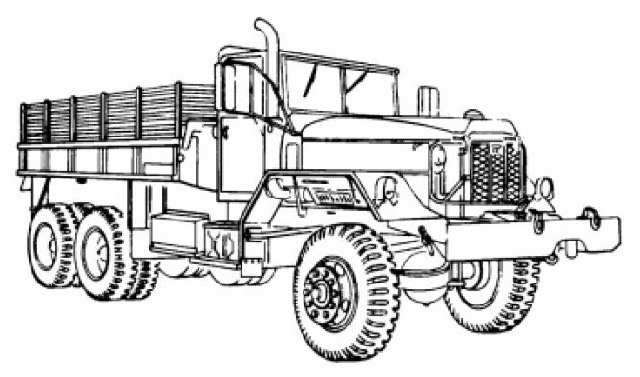
M813 Cargo truck

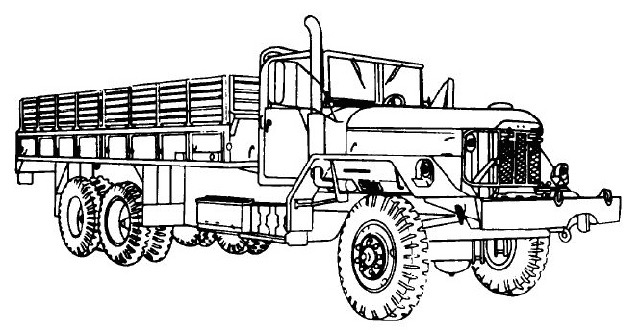
M814 Cargo truck

The M813 was the standard cargo version of the series. It had a 14 ft (4.3 m) long low sided box with a bottom hinged tailgate. Side racks, troop seats, and overhead bows with a tarpaulin were standard. A front-mounted winch was optional.

The standard body sides could secure a load but could not be loaded from the side by forklifts, so a body with drop sides was standardized as the M813A1.

The M814, with an extra long wheelbase, had a 20 ft (6.1 m) long box. There was no drop side version of the M814, and none had troop seats.

=== M815 Bolster logging truck ===
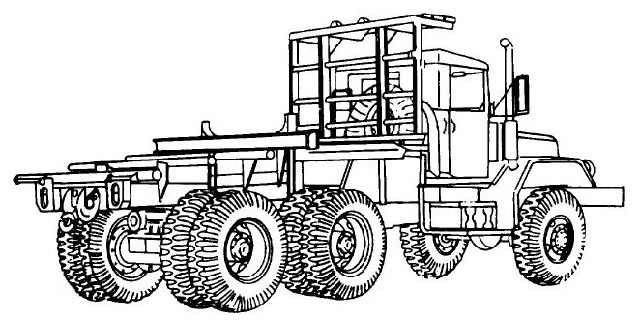
M815 Bolster logging truck

The M815 Bolster logging truck, with the M796 bolster trailer, was used to carry long loads like logs, poles, pipes, and bridge sections. The front of the load was secured to a rotating bolster on the truck and the rear of the load was secured to the trailer. The truck and trailer had a tubular boom ("reach") that connected them under the load. When the truck was unloaded the trailer could be loaded onto the truck. The truck had a large cab protection rack and both front and mid mounted winches.

=== M816 Medium wrecker truck ===
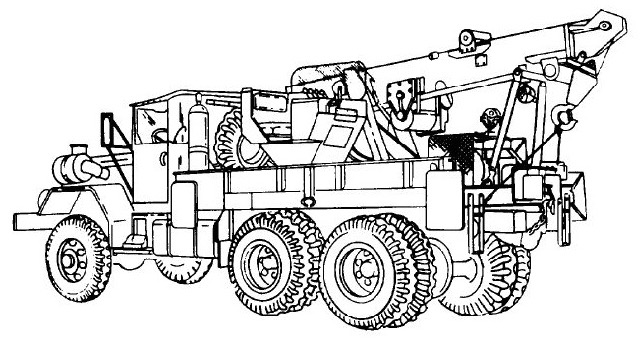
M816 Medium wrecker truck

The M816 Medium wrecker truck was used to recover disabled or stuck trucks and lift large components. A rotating, telescoping, and elevating hydraulic boom could lift a maximum of 20,000 lb (9,100 kg). Although the truck was not meant to carry a load, the boom could support 7,000 lb (3,200 kg) when towing. They had 20,000 lb (9,100 kg) front and 45,000 lb (20,000 kg) rear winches, outriggers, boom braces, chocks, block and tackle, oxygen-acetylene torches, and other automotive tools.

=== M817 Dump truck ===
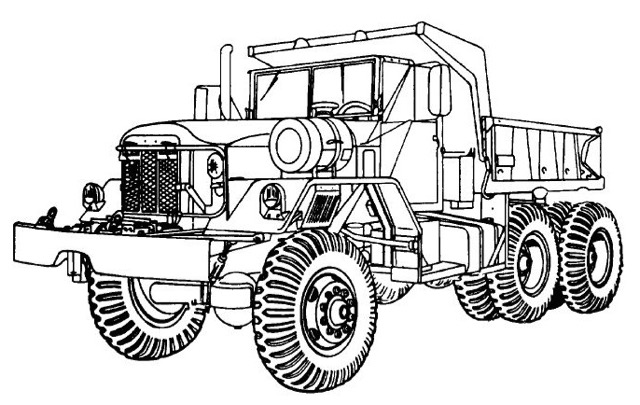
M817 Dump truck

The M817 dump truck was used to haul sand, gravel, dirt, rubble, scrap, and other bulk materials. It had a 5 cubic yards (3.8 m^{3}) dump body with cab protector and a tailgate that could hinge at either the top or bottom. Normal loads are heavy by volume, the dump body was smaller and more heavily built than a cargo body. They could be equipped with overhead bows, tarpaulin, and troop seats, but the relatively small size of the body limited their passenger or cargo load.

=== M818 Tractor trucks ===
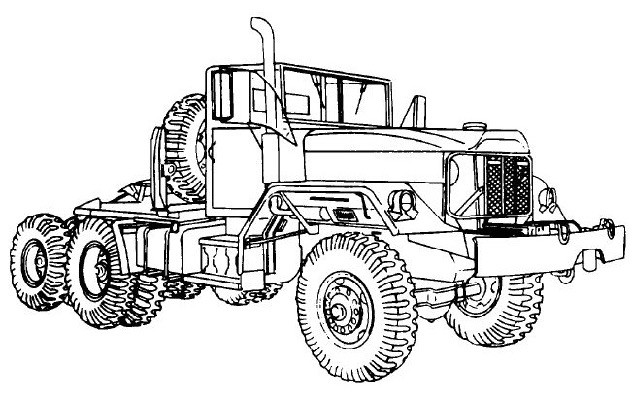
M818 Tractor truck

M818 Tractor trucks were used to tow semi-trailers up to 37,500 lb (17,000 kg) with 15,000 lb (6,800 kg) on their fifth wheel. Semi-tractor/trailers have to stay on relatively flat ground, and are not rated for full off-road use. On improved roads they could tow up to 55,000 lb (25,000 kg) with 25,000 lb (11,000 kg) on their fifth wheel.

The M818 normally towed a 12-ton 2 axle trailer. There were stake and platform, van, low-bed, and tanker bodies. 6-ton 2 axle expansible vans and 6-ton single axle vans were also used.

=== M819 Medium wrecker tractor truck ===
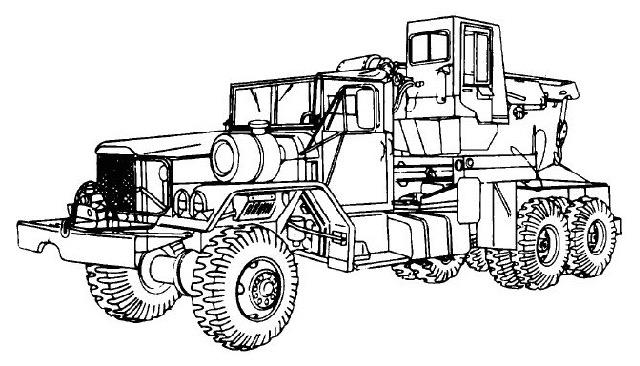
M819 Wrecker tractor truck

The M819 Medium wrecker tractor truck, with an extra long wheelbase, was a wrecker with a fifth wheel mounted behind the boom. This let the truck load and tow semi trailers. Meant for aircraft recovery, they had a smaller body and less equipment than the M816.

All had a front winch, the fifth wheel replaced the rear winch. As a wrecker the boom could lift up to 20,000 lb (9,100 kg), and had a longer reach than the M816. As a tractor the fifth wheel load rating was 15,000 lb (6,800 kg). Because of the high empty weight as a semi tractor, oversize 12.00x20 tires were used, this was the only model to have this size.

=== M820 Expansible van truck ===
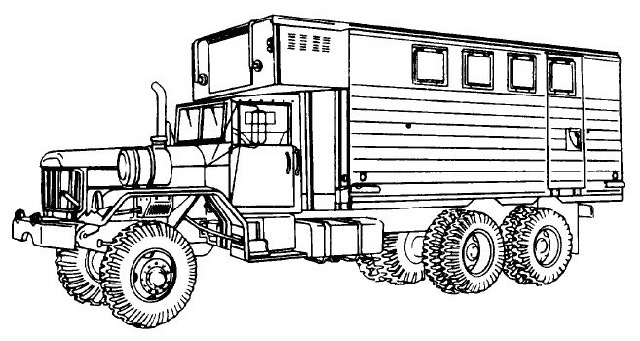
M820 Expansible van truck

The M820 Expansible van truck had a 17 ft (5.2 m) long van body with a slide out section on each side. When the sections are extended the working floor was almost 14 ft (4.3 m) wide. The body could support 5,000 lb (2,300 kg) of communications equipment. Heaters and air-conditioners (except the M820A1) were housed above the cab. The M820A1 had no windows or air-conditioning, the M820A3 and M820A4 had a hydraulic rear lift gate. None had a front-mounted winch.

=== M821 Bridge transporting stake truck ===
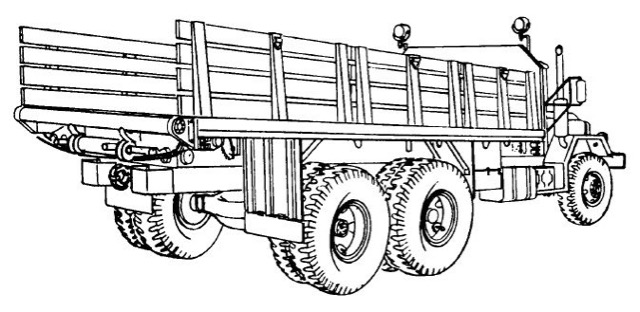
M821 Bridge transporting stake truck

The M821 Bridge transporting stake truck had a 20 ft (6.1 m) long body for carrying bridging equipment and components. They had a roller on the rear to help unloading and small winches on the side to secure cargo. The stake sides could be removed to carry oversize loads. The largest tires in the series, 14.00x20, were used with dual rear tires.

=== M809 chassis variants ===
The M809-series chassis was also used as a platform for several special purpose vehicles. The short M810 chassis was used by Engineer construction units to mount a 1,000 gallon water distributor or an 800-gallon bituminous distributor, while the standard long M809 chassis was used to mount a larger 1,500 gallon bituminous distributor; the extra long M811 chassis was used to mount the so-called "Bat Wing" body Shop Equipment Organizational Repair Truck Mounted (SEORTM), and the Antenna Mast section of Patriot Missile Batteries, while the extra long M812 with oversize 14.00x20 tires was used to carry and launch Improved Ribbon Bridge sections and Bridge Erection Boats.

== Dimensions ==
Model	Wheelbase	Length (Note: With winch except M820 and M821.)	Width	Height	Weight empty
M813; Cargo	Long	26 ft 7 in (8.10 m)	8 ft 2 in (2.49 m)	9 ft 9 in (2.97 m)	21,020 lb (9,530 kg)
M814; Cargo (long)	Extra long	32 ft 11 in (10.03 m)	8 ft 2 in (2.49 m)	9 ft 9 in (2.97 m)	23,540 lb (10,680 kg)
M815; Bolster	Long	26 ft 7 in (8.10 m)	8 ft 2 in (2.49 m)	9 ft 8 in (2.95 m)	21,040 lb (9,540 kg)
M816; Wrecker	Long	29 ft 7 in (9.02 m)	8 ft 2 in (2.49 m)	9 ft 4 in (2.84 m)	35,050 lb (15,900 kg)
M817; Dump	Short	24 ft 1 in (7.34 m)	8 ft 2 in (2.49 m)	9 ft 4 in (2.84 m)	23,755 lb (10,775 kg)
M818; Tractor	Short	23 ft 4 in (7.11 m)	8 ft 2 in (2.49 m)	9 ft 4 in (2.84 m)	20,165 lb (9,147 kg)
M819; Wreck/Trac	Extra long	29 ft 10 in (9.09 m)	8 ft 2 in (2.49 m)	11 ft (3.35 m)	35,065 lb (15,905 kg)
M820; Expansible	Extra long	30 ft 3 in (9.22 m)	8 ft 2 in (2.49 m) (Note: 13 ft 11 in (4.24 m) when expanded.)	11 ft 6 in (3.51 m)	28,195 lb (12,789 kg)
M821; Bridge	Extra long	31 ft 10 in (9.70 m)	8 ft 2 in (2.49 m)	9 ft 6 in (2.90 m)	28,880 lb (13,100 kg)

== Gallery ==
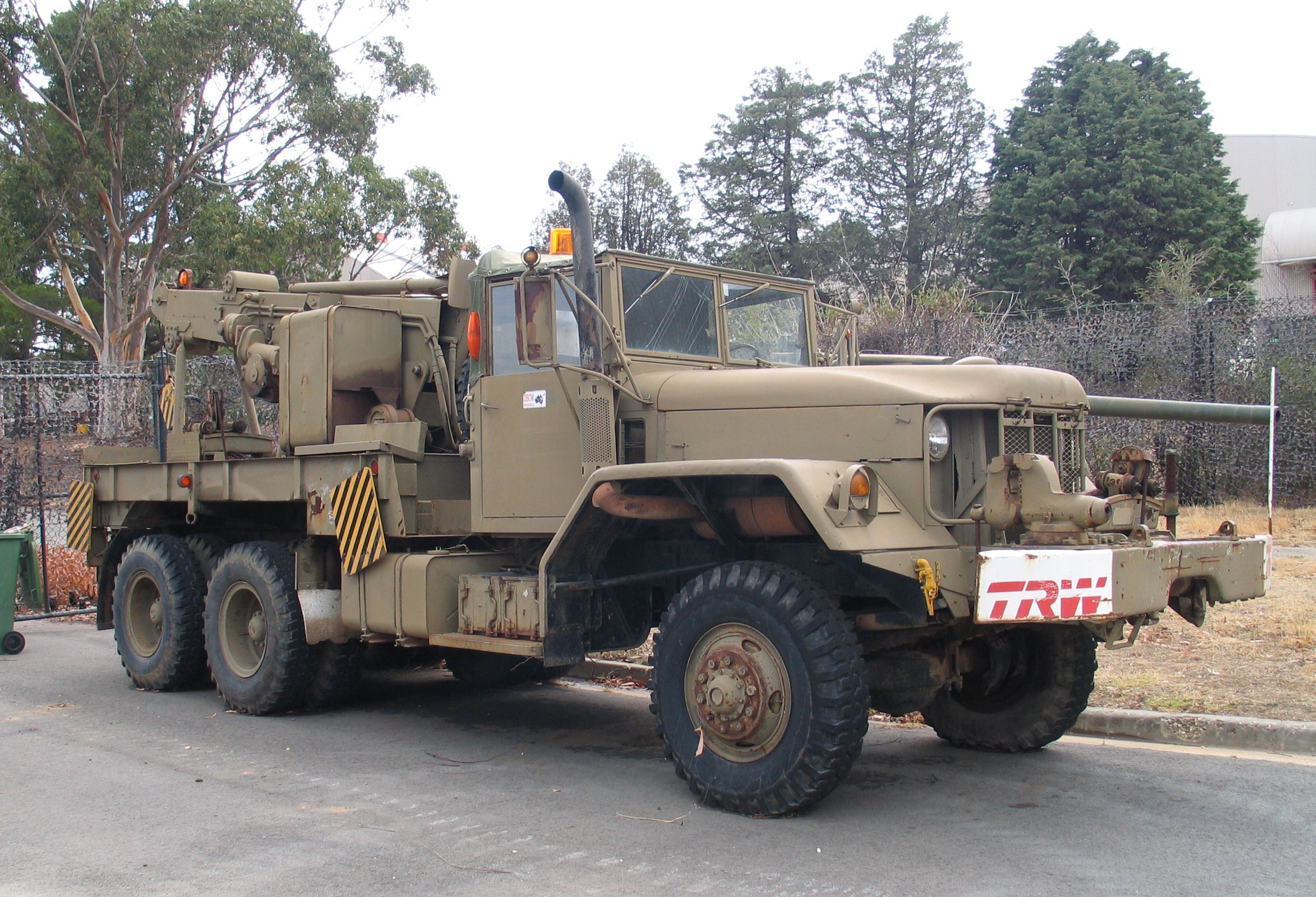
M816 Wrecker
privately owned

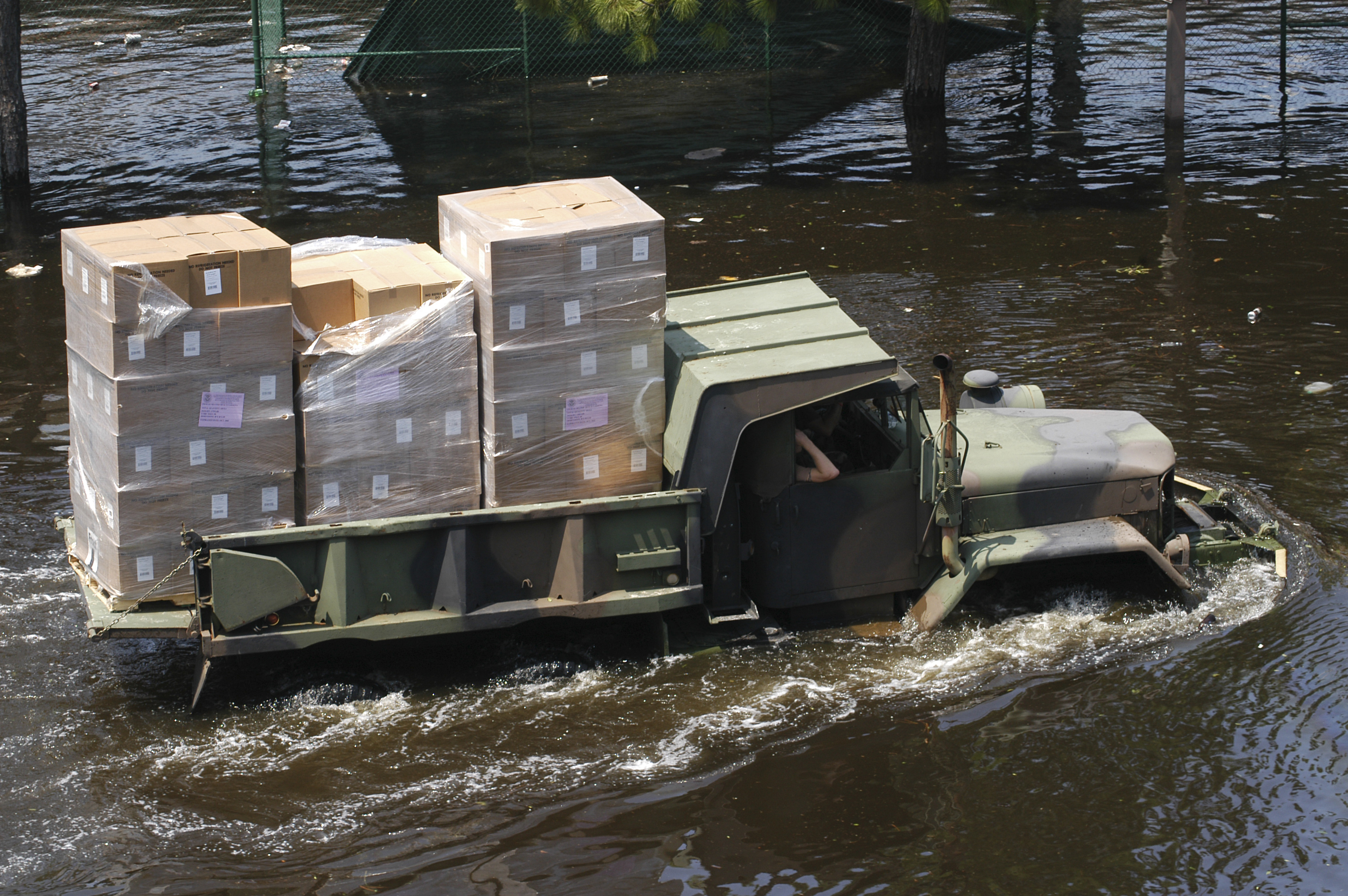
M817 Dump truck
Flood relief
Louisiana, 2005

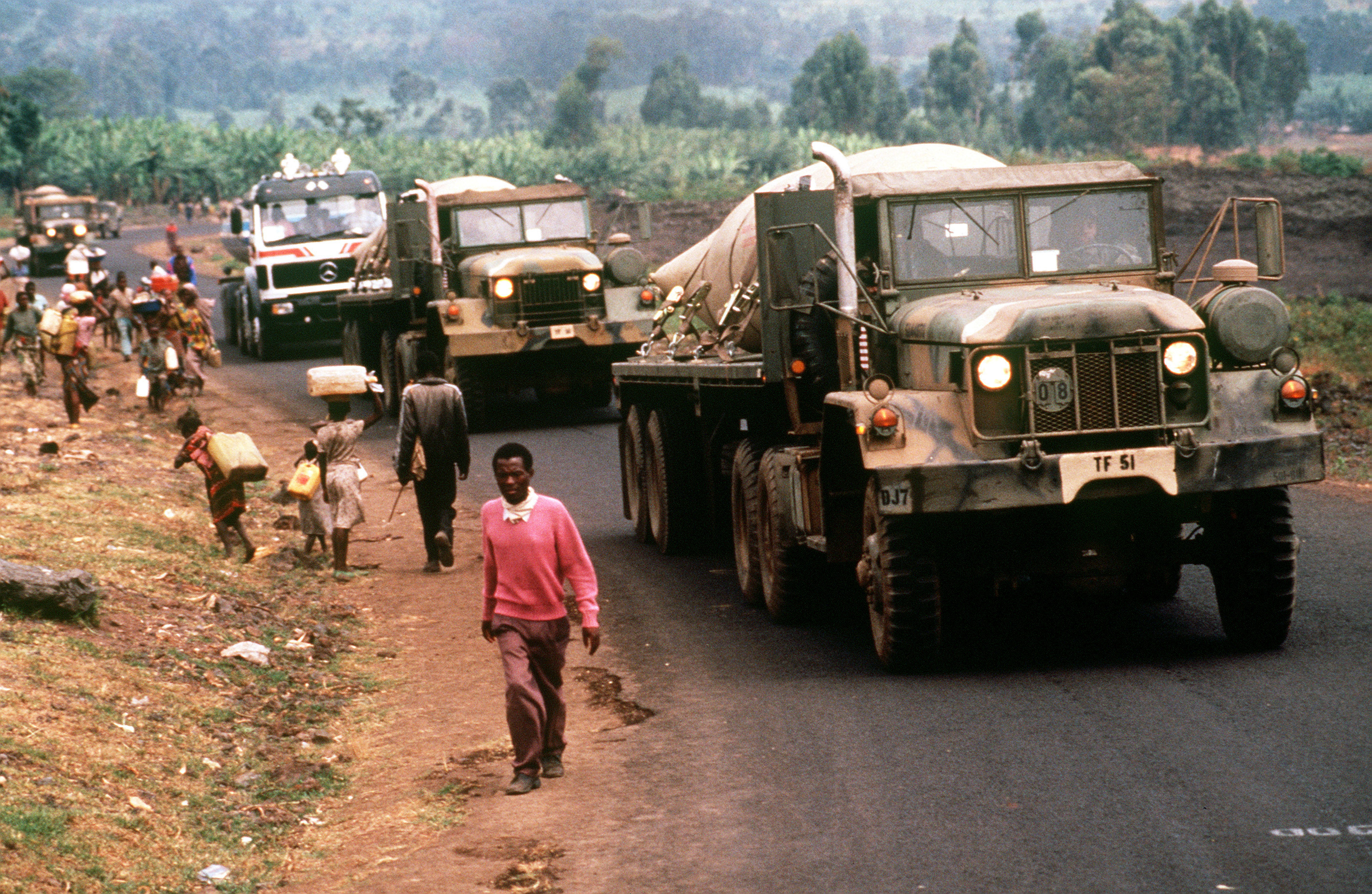
M818 Semi-tractor
Water convoy
Zaire, 1994

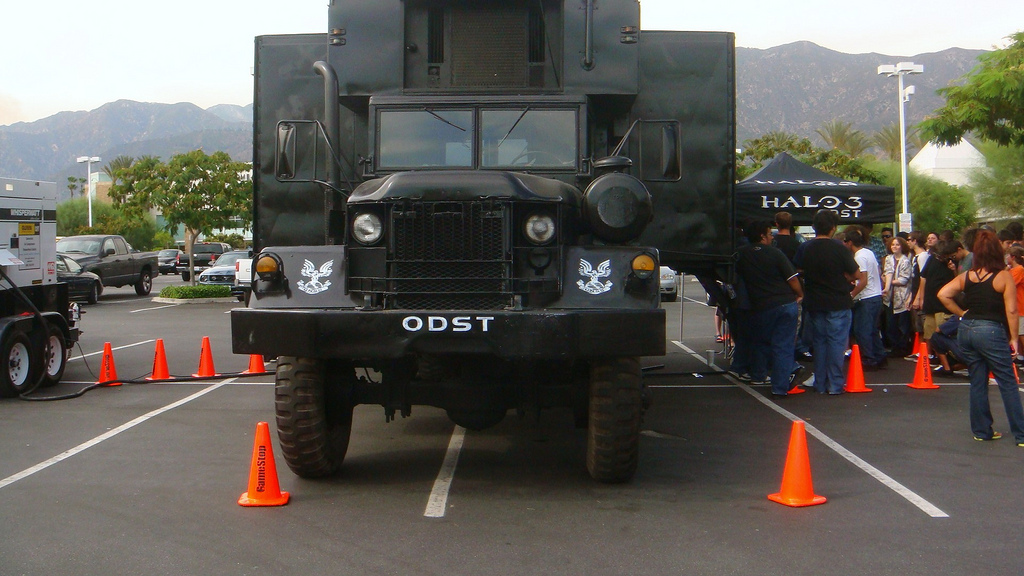
M820 Expansible van
privately owned

== Operators ==
- Algeria
- Argentina
- Australia
- Brazil
- Cambodia
- Canada
- Chile
- Colombia
- El Salvador
- Egypt
- Ethiopia
- Georgia
- Iran
- Iraq
- Israel
- Jordan
- South Korea
- Kuwait
- Laos
- Lebanon
- Liberia
- Morocco
- New Zealand
- Pakistan
- Philippines
- Portugal
- Saudi Arabia
- Singapore
- Thailand
- Tunisia
- Turkey
- Yemen
- Zaire
- Vietnam
- Panama
