= M39 series 5-ton 6×6 truck =

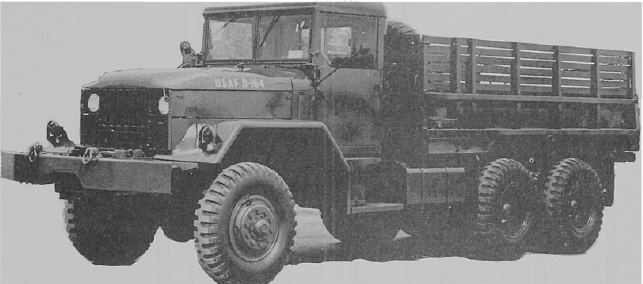
- M54 cargo truck
- Type: 5-ton 6×6 truck
- Place of origin: United States

Production history
- Designer: International Harvester
- Manufacturer: Diamond T, International Harvester; Kaiser/Kaiser-Jeep, Mack
- Produced: 1951–1969

Specifications (M54 w/winch)
- Mass: 19,945 lb (9,047 kg) (empty)
- Length: 24 feet 11 inches (7.59 m)
- Width: 8 feet 1 inch (2.46 m)
- Height: 9 feet 8 inches (2.95 m)
- Engine: Continental R6602; Mack ENDT-673; Continental LDS-465-1A; 224 hp (167 kW) The -A1 upgrade had a Mack ENDT-673, a 673 cu in (11.0 L) turbocharged inline 6 cylinder diesel engine developing 210 hp (160 kW) at 2100 rpm. The -A2 upgrade had a Continental LDS-465-1A, a 478 cu in (7.8 L) turbocharged inline 6 cylinder developing 175 hp (130 kW) at 2100 rpm.
- Transmission: 5 speed X 2 range trf. case
- Suspension: Live beam axles on leaf springs
- Operational range: 280 mi (450.6 km)
- Maximum speed: 52 mph (84 km/h)

The M39 series 5-ton 6×6 truck (G744) was a family of heavy tactical trucks built for the United States Armed Forces between 1951 and 1969. The basic cargo version was designed to transport a 5-ton (4,500 kg), 14 ft (4.3 m) long load over all terrain in all weather. In on-road service the load weight was doubled.

The M39 series was the primary heavy truck of the U.S. Army and U.S. Marine forces during the Vietnam War, and was also used by the U.S. Navy, U.S. Air Force, and ARVN forces.

The M39 series began to be replaced by the M809 series in 1970, followed by the M939 series in 1982, but continues to serve in other nations' armed forces around the world.

== History ==
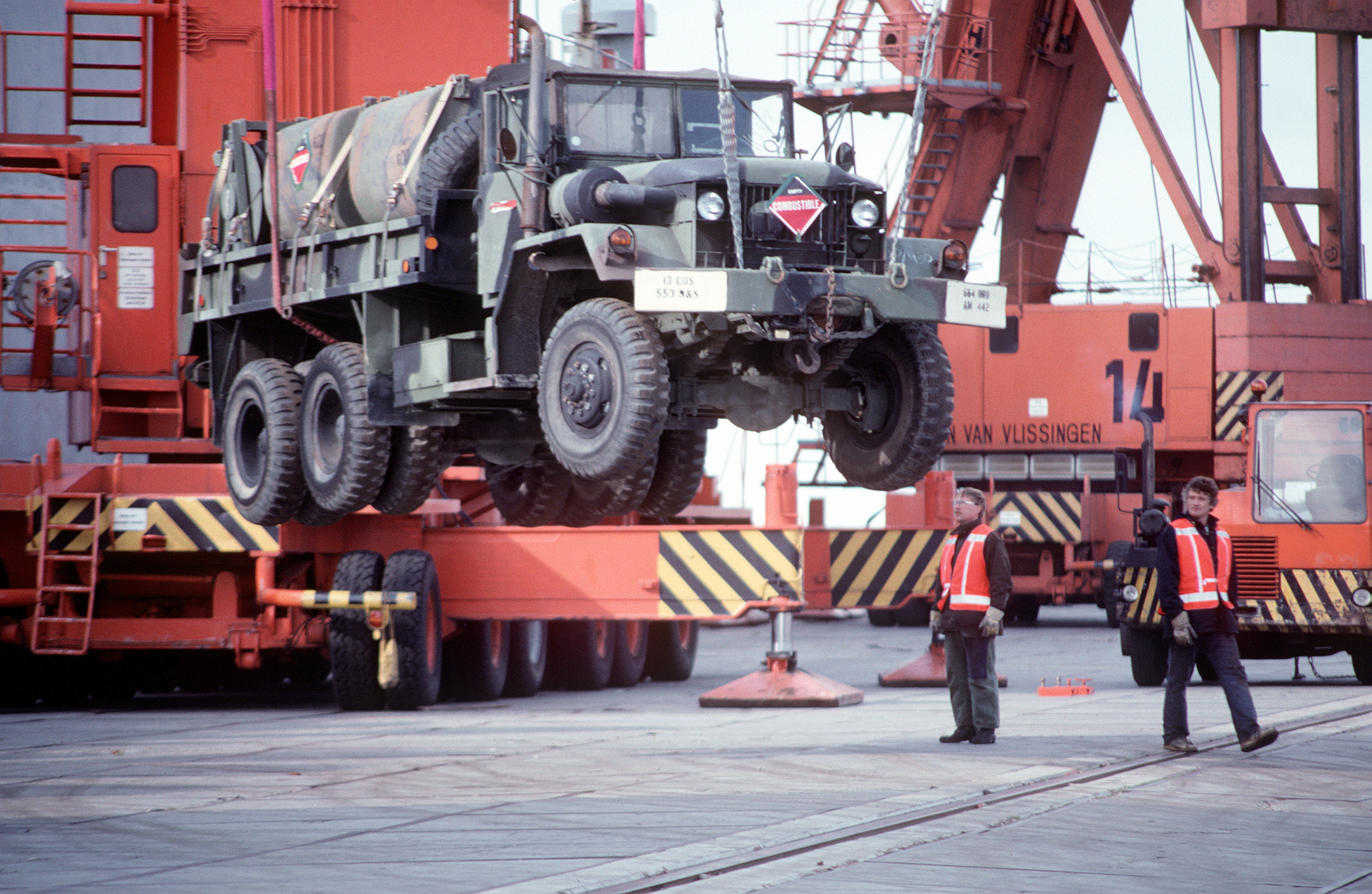
M54 cargo truck during Exercise Reforger, 1991

The M39 (G744) series was designed as a 5-ton (4536 kg), three-axle all-wheel-drive off-road truck to replace World War II-era trucks such as 4- and 6-ton 6×6s built by Brockway, Diamond T, Mack, and White. Rushed into production by International Harvester in 1951, soon Kaiser (renamed Kaiser-Jeep in 1963) also became a major manufacturer, with Diamond T and Mack building smaller numbers. The M39 series evolved into the M809 (G908) series in 1969, which followed, but did not replace, it. The M809 Series was then improved into the M939 series.

== Specifications ==
=== Engine ===
The M39 series were originally powered by the Continental R6602, a 602 cu in (9.9 L) overhead valve inline 6 cylinder gasoline engine which developed 224 hp (167 kW) at 2800 rpm. The -A1 upgrade had a Mack ENDT-673, a 673 cu in (11.0 L) turbocharged inline 6 cylinder diesel engine developing 210 hp (160 kW) at 2100 rpm. The -A2 upgrade had a Continental LDS-465-1A, a 478 cu in (7.8 L) turbocharged inline 6 cylinder multifuel engine developing 175 hp (130 kW) at 2100 rpm.

Gas engine models have a down-swept exhaust exiting from under the body just ahead of the righthand front set of rear wheels. Diesel (-A1) and multifuel (-A2) models have a vertical exhaust stack and air cleaner on the right fender; however a very small number of the earliest -A1 models and some -A2 gas/multifuel conversions are seen with same style of downswept exhaust as on gas models.

Of important note, A2's with a factory build date prior 1964 originally were gas engine models. Most of these conversions received the overdrive-5th transmission found in "pure" -A1 and "pure" -A2 models. However, some converts retained their original gas model direct-5th transmission which gave closer gear ratios but a top speed of only 45 mph with a multifuel due to the lower top rpm allowed on that engine compared to a gas engine.

=== Driveline ===
All M39s had a Spicer 5-speed manual transmission. Gasoline trucks had a “low” 1st gear and direct 5th. Diesel and multifuel trucks had a different model with a ”low” 1st, direct 4th, and overdrive 5th. A 2-speed transfer case engaged the front axle automatically if the rear axles slipped and moved faster than the front axle. Timken axles were used. Gas models had a 6.44:1 final drive gear ratio except for the M129 C/D, which had a 10.26:1

=== Chassis ===
The M39 series had a ladder frame with three live beam axles, the front on leaf springs, the rear tandem on leaf springs with locating arms. There were three chassis wheelbases (measurements are from the centerline of the front axle to the centerline of rear tandem). The M61 short wheelbase chassis, used for tractors and dump trucks, is 167 inches (4.24 m), the M40 long chassis, used for cargo and wreckers, is 179 inches (4.55 m), and the M63 extra-long chassis, used for long cargo and expansible vans, is 215 inches (5.46 m). There was also an M139 heavy duty extra long chassis for extreme service, including the Honest John rocket launcher truck.

Many M39 series were equipped with a front-mounted 20,000 lb (9,100 kg) Garwood winch, intended for self-recovery. A winch weighed 714 lb (324 kg) and added 15 1/2 in (39 cm) inches to the length of the truck.

The M39 series had both single- and dual-rear-tire models; very few single-rear-tire trucks were built. Most models had 11.00×20s with dual rear tires; tractor wreckers had larger 12.00×20s. Bridge trucks and all M139 chassis-based trucks had 14.00×20s. A standard military cab, designed by REO, was used. It had hinged doors with roll-up windows, a folding windshield, and a removable canvas roof. A hard roof could be fitted. Cargo trucks and tractors could be fitted with a ring mount for a M2 Browning machine gun.

== Models ==
=== M54 and M55 cargo truck ===
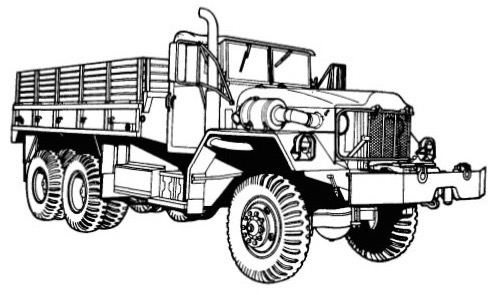
M54 cargo truck

The M54 was the standard cargo version of the series. It had a 7 ft (2.1 m) × 14 ft (4.3 m) low-sided box with a bottom-hinged tailgate. Side racks, troop seats, and overhead bows with a canvas cover were standard. A front-mounted winch was optional.

The standard body sides could secure a load but could not be loaded from the side by forklifts, so a body with drop sides was standardized as the M54A1C.

The M55, with an extra-long wheelbase, had a 20-foot-long (6.1 m) box. By contrast, there was no drop-side version of the M814 successor.

=== M51 dump truck ===
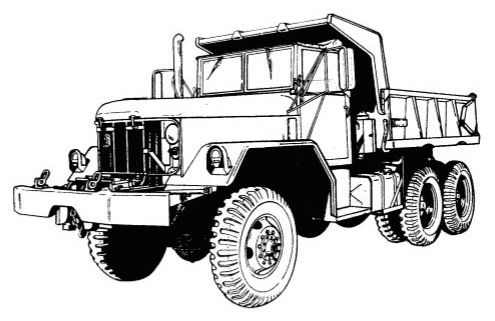
M51 dump truck

The M51 was a dump truck used to haul sand, gravel, dirt, rubble, scrap, and other bulk materials. It had a 10-foot-long (3.0 m), 5-cubic-yard (3.8 m^{3}) dump body with cab protector and a tailgate that could hinge at either the top or bottom. They could be equipped with overhead bows, tarpaulin, and troop seats, but the relatively small size of the body limited their passenger or cargo load.

=== M52 tractor truck ===
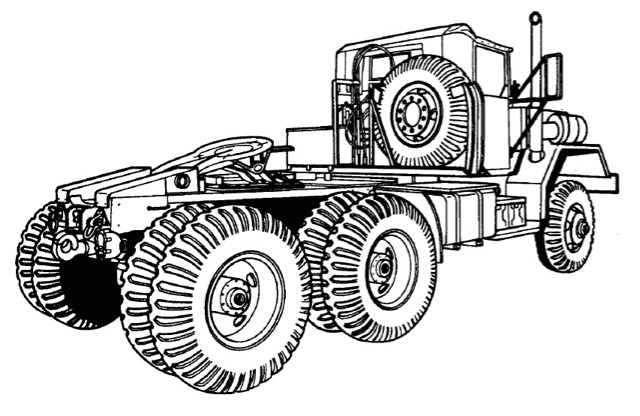
M52 tractor truck

Tractor trucks were used to tow semi-trailers up to 37,500 lb (17,000 kg) with 15,000 lb (6,800 kg) on their fifth wheel. Semi-tractor/trailers have to stay on relatively flat ground, and are not rated for full off-road use. On improved roads they could tow up to 55,000 lb (25,000 kg) with 25,000 lb (11,000 kg) on their fifth wheel.

Tractor trucks normally towed a 12-ton, 2-axle trailer. There were stake and platform, van, low-bed, and tanker bodies. Six-ton, 2-axle expansible vans and 6-ton, single-axle vans were also used.

=== M62 and M543 medium wrecker truck ===
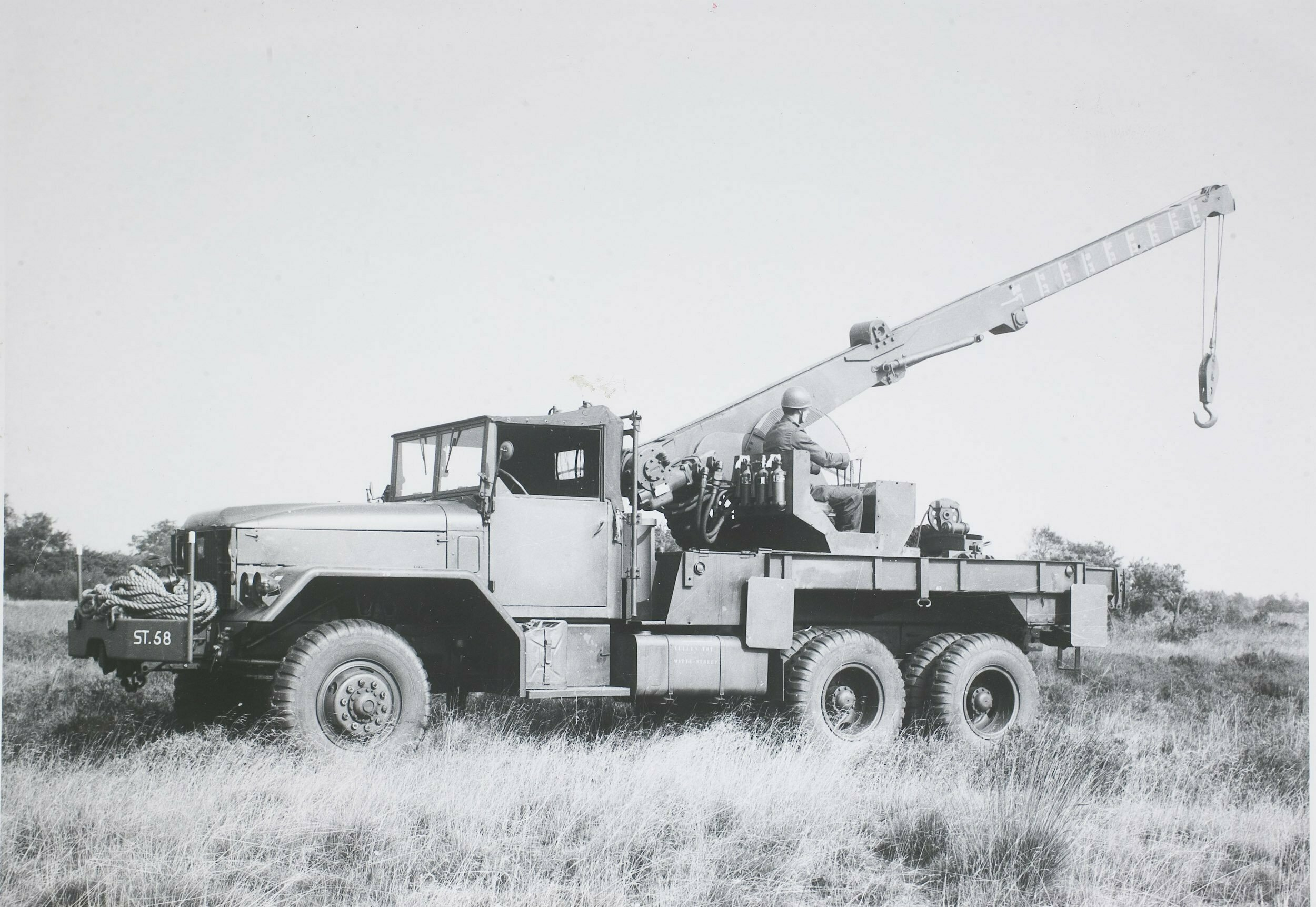
M62 wrecker/crane

The M62 and 543 were wreckers used to recover disabled or stuck trucks and lift large components. A rotating, telescoping, and elevating hydraulic boom could lift a maximum of 20,000 lb (9,100 kg). The M62 had an Austin Western boom; its replacement, the M543, had one by Garwood. Although the truck was not meant to carry a load, the boom could support 7,000 lb (3,200 kg) when towing. They had 20,000 lb (9,100 kg) front and 45,000 lb (20,000 kg) rear winches, outriggers, boom braces, chocks, block and tackle, oxygen-acetylene torches, and other automotive tools.

=== M246 wrecker tractor truck ===
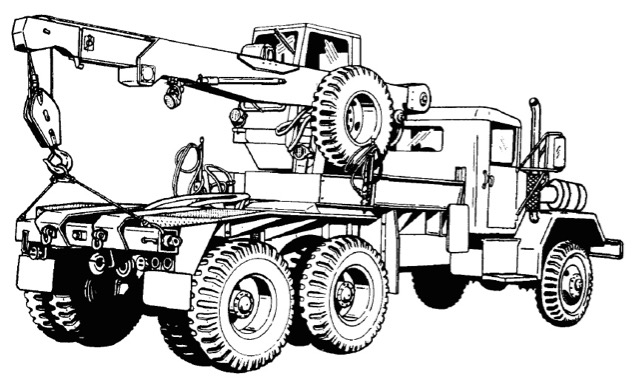
M246 medium wrecker tractor truck

The M246, with an extra long wheelbase, was a wrecker with a fifth wheel mounted behind the boom. This let the truck perform wrecker duties and to load and tow semi trailers. All had a front and rear winch. Oversize 12.00×20 were used, this was the only model to have this size. As a wrecker the boom could support 12,000 lb (5,400 kg), as a tractor the fifth wheel load rating was 15,000 lb (6,800 kg).

=== M291 expansible van truck ===
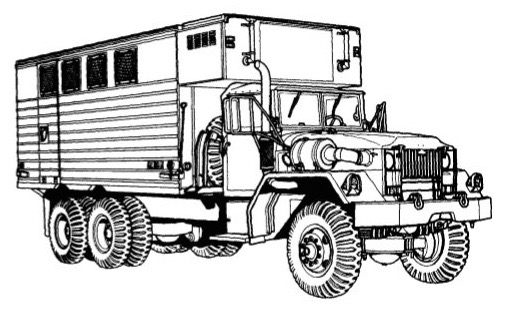
M291 expansible van truck

The M291 had a 17-foot-long (5.2 m) van body with a slide-out section on each side. When the sections are extended the working floor was over 12 ft (3.7 m) wide. The body could support 5,000 lb (2,300 kg) of communications equipment. The M291A1D had a rear power lift gate. None had a front-mounted winch.

=== M328 bridge transporting stake truck ===
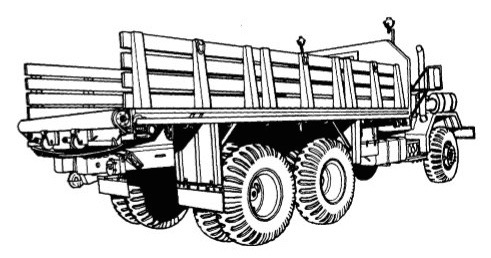
M328 bridge transporting stake truck

The M328 had a stake body 20 ft (6.1 m) long by 7 ft (2.1 m) wide for carrying bridging equipment and components. They had a roller on the rear to help unloading and small winches on the side to secure cargo. The stake sides could be removed to carry oversize loads. The largest tires in the series, 14.00x20, were used with dual rear tires.

=== M748 bolster truck ===
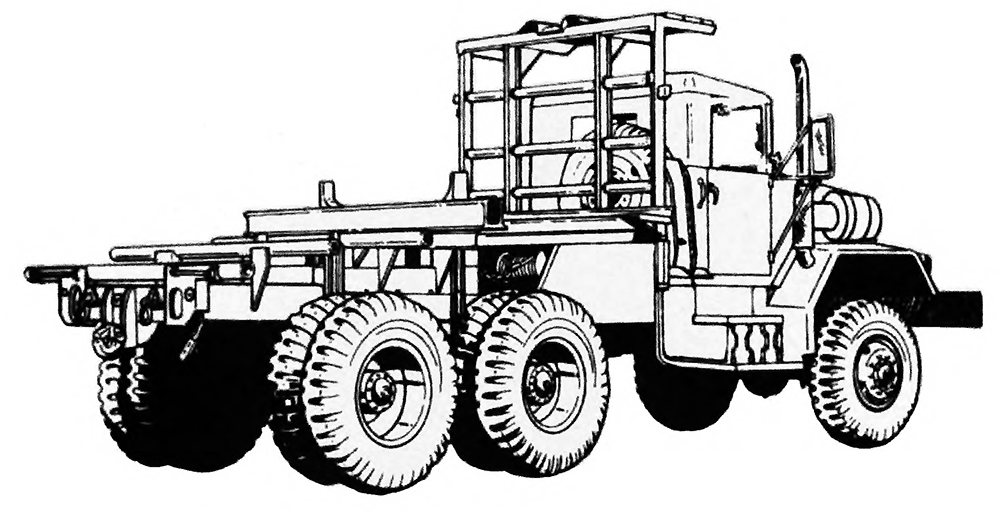
M748 bolster truck

The M748, with the M796 bolster trailer, was used to carry long loads like logs, poles, and bridge sections. The front of the load was secured to a rotating bolster on the truck and the rear of the load was secured to the trailer. The truck and trailer had a tubular boom that connected them under the load. When the truck was unloaded the trailer could be loaded onto the truck. The truck had a large cab protection rack and both front and mid-mounted winches.

=== Chassis cabs ===
In addition to standardized models, bare chassis cabs were produced for specialty bodies. The largest, the M139C/D, was an Honest John rocket launcher. None had diesel or multi-fuel engines for weight reasons, and they had stronger axles with a lower final drive ratio.

=== Gun trucks ===
Gun trucks were a field expedient, with improvised armor and twin, or M45 Quadmount .50 caliber M2 machine guns.

== Dimensions ==
Model	Wheelbase	Length (Note: With winch except M291.)	Width	Height	Weight empty Weight loaded
M51 Dump	167 in (4.24 m)	23 ft 6 in (7.16 m)	8 ft 1 in (2.46 m)	9 ft 3 in (2.82 m)	21,523 lb (9,763 kg); 31,523 lb (14,299 kg)
M52 Tractor	167 in (4.24 m)	22 ft 9 in (6.93 m)	8 ft 1 in (2.46 m)	8 ft 7 in (2.62 m)	19,027 lb (8,631 kg); 34,027 lb (15,434 kg)
M54 Cargo	179 in (4.55 m)	26 ft 2 in (7.98 m)	8 ft 1 in (2.46 m)	9 ft 8 in (2.95 m)	19,945 lb (9,047 kg); 29,945 lb (13,583 kg)
M55 Cargo (long)	215 in (5.46 m)	32 ft 2 in (9.80 m)	8 ft 1 in (2.46 m)	9 ft 9 in (2.97 m)	24,063 lb (10,915 kg); 34,063 lb (15,451 kg)
M62 Wrecker	179 in (4.55 m)	29 ft (8.84 m)	8 ft 1 in (2.46 m)	10 ft 7 in (3.23 m)	33,325 lb (15,116 kg)
M139C; Chassis cab	215 in (5.46 m)	29 ft 5 in (8.97 m)	9 ft 6 in (2.90 m)		18,929 lb (8,586 kg) (Note: Empty weight without body.)
M246; Wrecker Tractor	215 in (5.46 m)	29 ft 4 in (8.94 m)	8 ft 2 in (2.49 m)	11 ft (3.35 m)	32,830 lb (14,890 kg)
M291A1; Expansible van	215 in (5.46 m)	30 ft 11 in (9.42 m)	8 ft 3 in (2.51 m)	11 ft 5 in (3.48 m)	26,270 lb (11,920 kg); 31,270 lb (14,180 kg)
M328A1; Bridge transport	215 in (5.46 m)	30 ft 6 in (9.30 m)	9 ft 7 in (2.92 m)	10 ft 1 in (3.07 m)	26,586 lb (12,059 kg); 36,586 lb (16,595 kg)
M543 Wrecker	179 in (4.55 m)	29 ft 1 in (8.86 m)	8 ft (2.44 m)	9 ft 1 in (2.77 m)	34,440 lb (15,620 kg)
M748A1; Bolster logging	179 in (4.55 m)	26 ft 2 in (7.98 m)	8 ft 2 in (2.49 m)	10 ft 1 in (3.07 m)	21,264 lb (9,645 kg); 31,264 lb (14,181 kg)

== Gallery ==
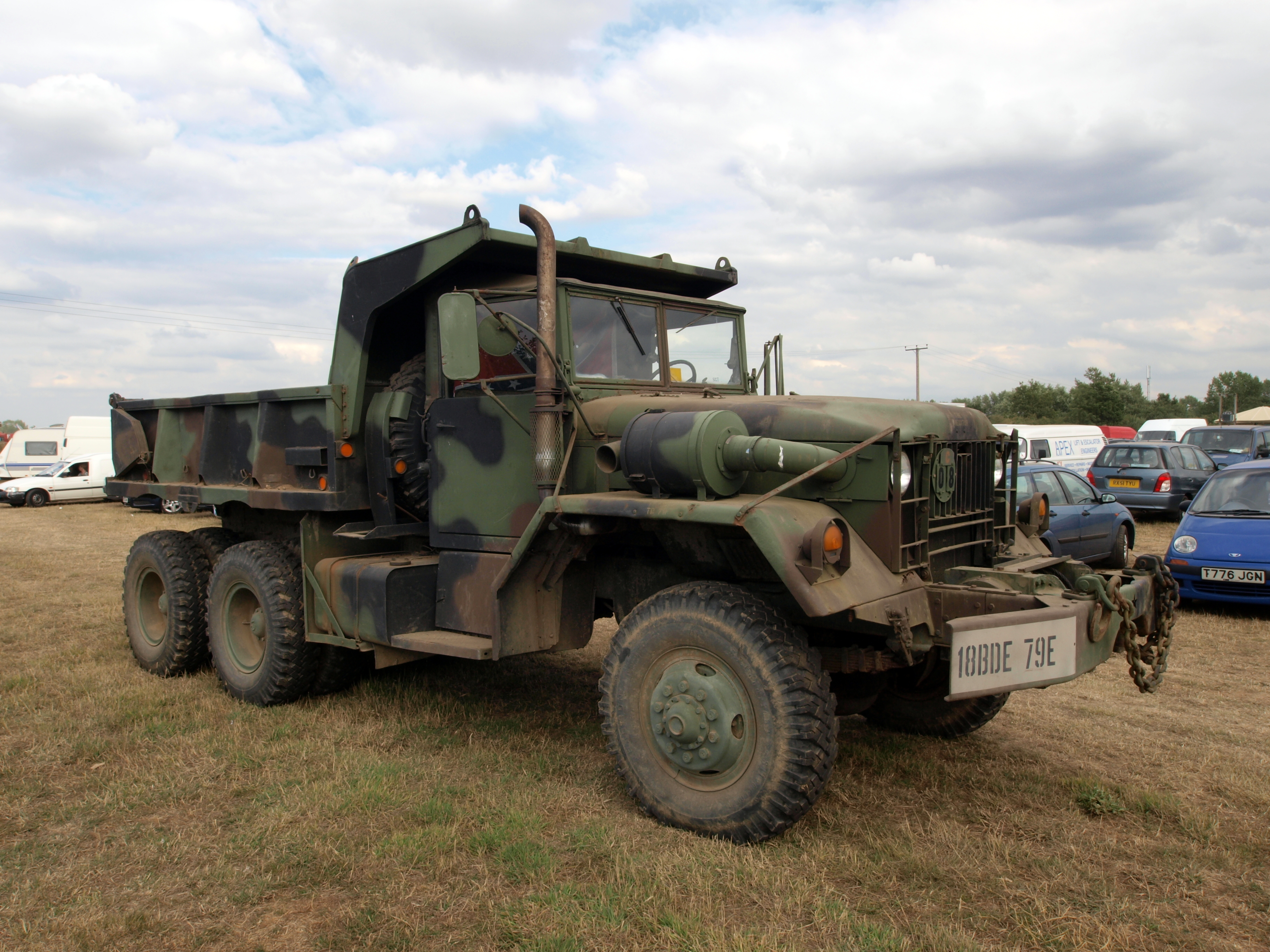
M51 Dump truck

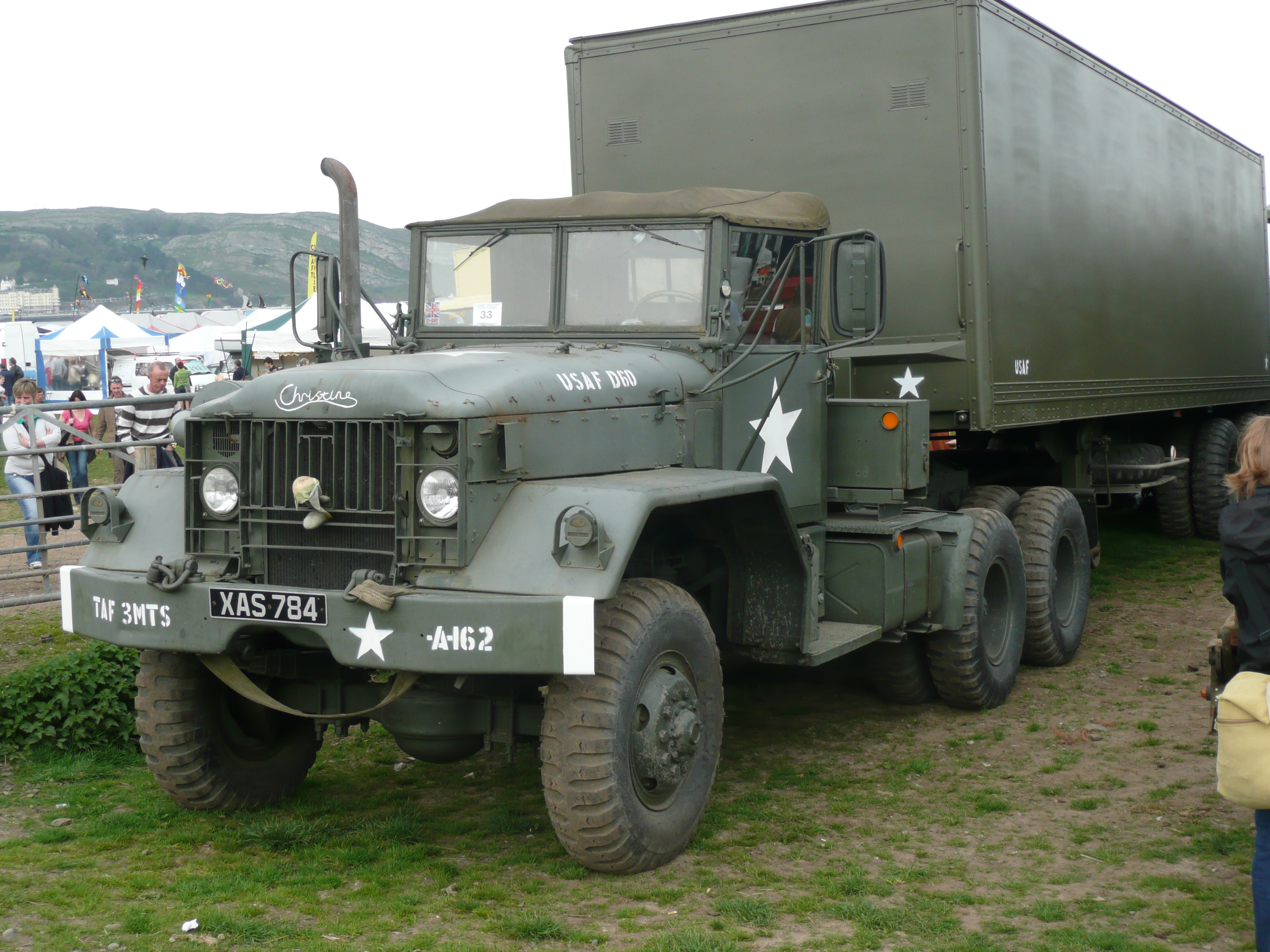
M52 Semi-tractor
with van trailer

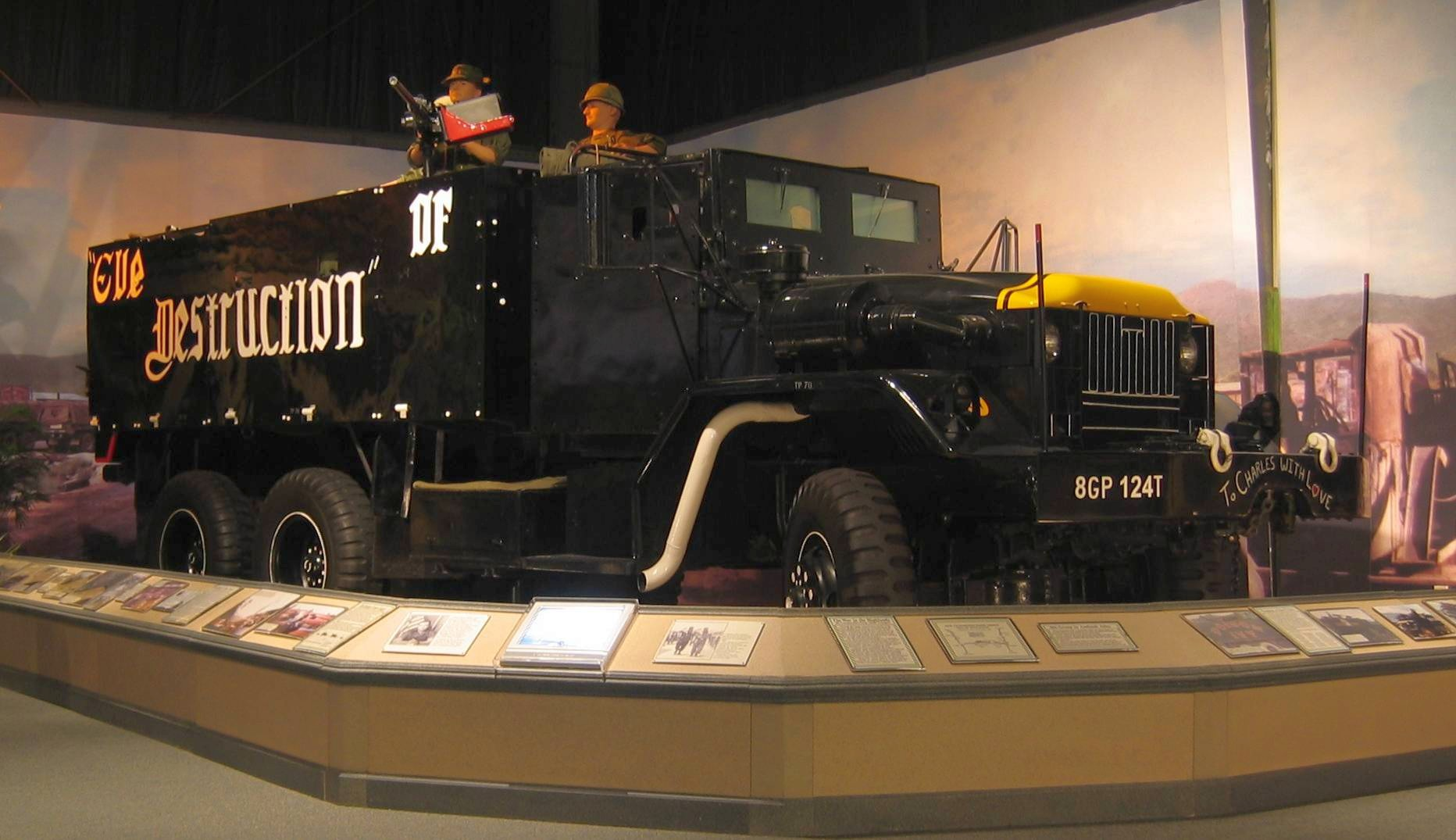
Gun truck
museum exhibit

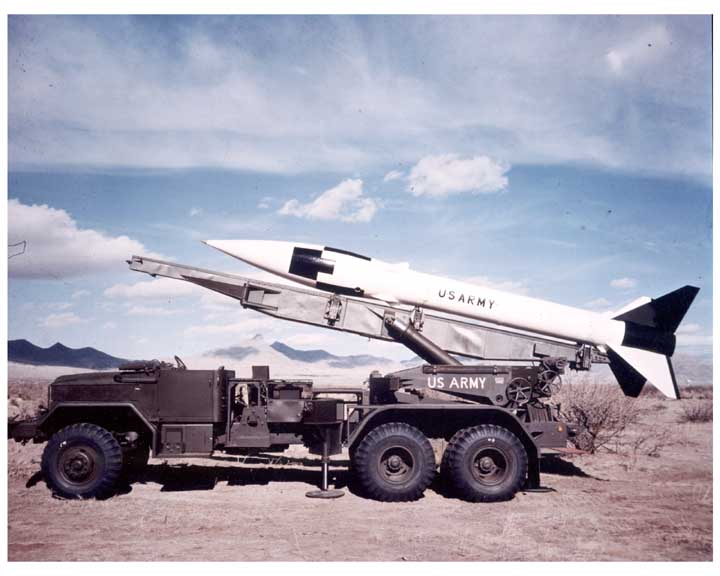
M139 with Honest John
rocket launcher

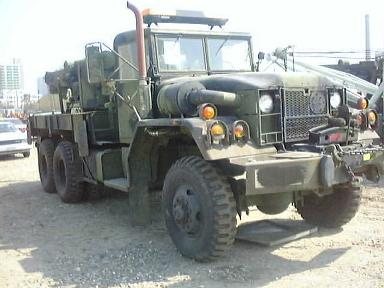
M543 Wrecker

== Operators ==
- Argentina
- Austria
- Belgium
- Bolivia
- Brazil
- Burma
- Cambodia
- Colombia
- Denmark
- Ethiopia
- West Germany
- Egypt
- Greece
- Guatemala
- Honduras
- Indonesia
- Iran
- Israel
- Italy
- Jordan
- South Korea
- Kuwait
- Lebanon
- Liberia
- Libya
- Morocco
- Netherlands
- Nicaragua
- Norway
- Pakistan
- Paraguay
- Peru
- Philippines
- Portugal
- Spain
- Taiwan
- Thailand
- Turkey
- United States
- Vietnam

== See also ==
- G-numbers (SNL G744)
- List of "M" series military vehicles
- M35 2½ ton cargo truck
