= List of the United States military vehicles by model number =

The following is a (partial) listing of vehicle model numbers or M-numbers assigned by the United States Army. Some of these designations are also used by other agencies, services, and nationalities, although these various end users usually assign their own nomenclature.

== M1 to M99 ==
For non-sequential numbers, like M1 Abrams, see bottom of list.

- M1 combat car, also known as the M1 light tank
- M1 light motorcycle
- M2 light tank, .5" MG or 37 mm gun, 11-ton
- M2 medium tank
- M2 combat car (G38), version of M1 with Guiberson diesel engine and trailing idler
- M3 Lee, (Lee/Grant), 28-ton, 37 mm and 75 mm gun
- M3 Stuart, 12-ton
- M4 Sherman, 30-ton, 75/76 mm gun
- M5 Stuart, M3 derivative with twin Cadillac V8 engines and redesigned hull
- M6 heavy tank, 60-ton
- M7 medium tank (G137)
- M8 armored car (Greyhound)
- M22 Locust tank, light, airborne, 37 mm gun
- M24 Chaffee tank, light, 18-ton, 75 mm gun
- M26 Pershing tank, medium (originally classified as heavy), full-track, 47-ton, 90 mm
  - M26E1 Pershing tank, medium, full-track, 47-ton, 90 mm
  - M26E2 Pershing tank, medium, full-track, 48.5-ton, 90 mm
- M27 medium tank, Detroit Arsenal
- M28 cargo carrier (G154); initial version of M29
- M29 Weasel carrier, cargo, full-track, 1/2-ton, amphibious (G179)
- M30 cargo carrier (G158), based on M4 Sherman
- M31 tank recovery vehicle (M3 Grant)
- M32 tank recovery vehicle (M4 Sherman)
  - M32A1 recovery vehicle, medium, 16 1/2 inch full-track
    - M32A1B1 recovery vehicle, medium, 23 3/4 inch full-track (M4A1 chassis)
    - M32A1B2 recovery vehicle, medium, full-track
    - M32A1B3 recovery vehicle, medium, full-track
  - M32B1 recovery vehicle, medium, crane & a-frame, f-t, (M4A1 chassis)
  - M32B2 recovery vehicle, medium, 16 1/2 inch track, (M4A4 chassis)
- M33 tank, prime mover, medium, full-track, 31-ton (G222); based on M31
- M34 tank, prime mover, medium, full-track, 31-ton (M32B1 converted)
- M35 tank, prime mover, turret removed, full-track (M10A1 hull)
- M39 armored utility vehicle, full-track, converted M18
- M41 Walker Bulldog tank, light, 23.5-ton, 76 mm gun
  - M41A1 tank, combat, light, pintle mounted mg, full-track, 76 mm
  - M41A2 tank, combat, light, new turret traverse, full-track, 76 mm
  - M41A3 tank, combat, light, fuel injection engine, full-track, 76 mm
- M42 flame tank (M4 Sherman)
- M44 armored personnel carrier
- M45 medium tank, (G226)
- M46 Patton tank, combat, medium, full-track, 90 mm, 48.5-ton
  - M46A1 tank, combat, medium, slope side turret, full-track, 90 mm, 48.5-ton
- M46E1 tank, combat, medium, .30 cal mg fender kit, full-track, 90 mm
- M47 Patton tank, combat, M46 w/T42 turret, full-track, 90 mm, 48.5-ton
- M48 Patton tank, combat, full-tracked, 90 mm, 49-ton (1951)
  - M48A1 tank, combat, gun stabilized in elevation and azimuth, 90 mm
  - M48A1E1 tank, combat, full-track, British 105 mm (M48A1 chassis)
  - M48A1E2 tank, combat, full-track, diesel engine, 90 mm
  - M48A2 tank, combat, f-t, fuel injection engine, 90 mm, 50.75-ton (1956)
  - M48A2C tank, combat, improved fire control, full-track, 90 mm
  - M48A2E1 tank, combat, multi-fuel engine, full-track, 90 mm (1959)
  - M48A3 tank, combat, production version of M48A1E2, 90 mm (1960)
  - M48A4 tank, combat, f-t, M60 turret, 105 mm, (M48E3 chassis) (1965)
  - M48C tank, mild steel, 'C' for condemned embossed into right front hull
  - M48E1 tank, first with British gun, full-tracked, 105 mm
  - M48E2 tank, prototype of M48A2
- M49 Otter, carrier, cargo/troop, amphibious, full-tracked
- M51 recovery vehicle, full-track, heavy, 60-ton, 30 mph, 200 mi range
- M59 armored personnel carrier, full-track, 20-ton, (1955)
  - M59A1 carrier, armored personnel, machine gun cupola, f-t, 20-ton
- M60 main battle tank, full-tracked, 105 mm gun
  - M60A1 tank, full-tracked, 105 mm gun (1968)
    - M60A1E1 tank, combat, full-tracked, Zenon I/R, Shillelagh, new turret (1965)
    - M60A1E2 tank, combat, full-tracked, stabilized Shillelagh, 152mm
    - M60A1E3 tank, combat, full-tracked, experimental, 105 mm gun (1969)
    - M60A1E4 tank, experimental, f-t, remote controlled 20 mm, 105mm
  - M60A2 tank, full-tracked, remote controlled 20 mm, 152 mm Gun/Launcher (1970)
  - M60A3 tank, combat, full-tracked, laser rangefinder, 900 hp engine, 105mm
  - M60E1 tank, combat, full-tracked, British gun, 105mm
  - M60E2 tank, combat, full-tracked, Shillelagh 152 mm, remote controlled 20m
- M66 tank, combat, full-tracked, Zenon I/R, Shillelagh 152 mm,
- M67 tank, combat, full-tracked, flamethrower, range 200 m (M48A1 chassis)
  - M67A1 tank, combat, full-tracked, flamethrower, fuel capacity 378 gal (1961)
  - M67A2 tank, combat, full-tracked, flamethrower (M48A3 chassis)
- M70 reserved for German/American MBT-70
- M74 armored recovery vehicle, medium, full tracked (M4A3E8 chassis) (1952)
- M75 armored personnel carrier, medium, full-tracked
- M76 Otter carrier, cargo, amphibious, full-tracked, 1 1/4-ton
- M84 mortar carrier, self-propelled, full-track, 4.2-inch, (1956); derivative of M59
- M85 tractor, artillery towing, full-track, 23-ton
- M88 recovery vehicle, medium, full-tracked, 55-ton, gasoline engine
  - M88A1 recovery vehicle, improved, medium, full-tracked, 55-ton, diesel engine
  - M88A2 recovery vehicle, improved, heavy, full-tracked, 70-ton, diesel

=== Pre-consecutive "motor carriages" ===
- M1 mortar motor carriage 4.2 inch mortar on Cunningham T1E1 cargo carrier.
- M2 mortar motor carriage (T5E1), (G79) not to be confused with a halftrack
- M3 Gun Motor Carriage, (T12)
- M4 mortar motor carriage, (T19)
- M5 gun motor carriage, (T1), Cletrac
- M6 gun motor carriage, (T21),
- M7 howitzer motor carriage, (T32)
- M8 howitzer motor carriage, (T17E1), Scott
- M9 gun motor carriage, (T40)
- M10 gun motor carriage, (T35E1)
- M11 not used
- M12 Gun Motor Carriage, (T6)
- M13 Multiple Gun Motor Carriage
- M14 multiple gun motor carriage
- M15 Combination Gun Motor Carriage
- M16 Multiple Gun Motor Carriage
- M17 multiple gun motor carriage
- M18 gun motor carriage (T70)
- M19 Multiple Gun Motor Carriage (T65E1)
- M20 ? motor carriage
- M21 mortar motor carriage
- M22 ? motor carriage
- M23 ? motor carriage
- M24 ? motor carriage
- M25 ? motor carriage
- M26 ? motor carriage
- M27 ? motor carriage
- M28 ? motor carriage
- M29 ? motor carriage
- M30 ? motor carriage
- M31 ? motor carriage
- M32 ? motor carriage
- M33 ? motor carriage
- M34 gun motor carriage 40 mm halftrack (T160)??
- M35 ? motor carriage
- M36 gun motor carriage (T71E1)
- M37 105 mm howitzer motor carriage (T76)
- M38 ? motor carriage (M38 Wolfhound, 37 mm, 6 × 6?)
- M39 ? motor carriage
- M40 Gun Motor Carriage
- M41 howitzer motor carriage
- M42 gun motor carriage (Duster)
- M43 Howitzer Motor Carriage
- M44 self-propelled howitzer (T99)
- M45 self-propelled ?
- M46 self-propelled ?
- M47 self-propelled ?
- M48 self-propelled ?
- M49 self-propelled ?
- M50 self-propelled gun (T165)
- M51 self-propelled ?
- M52 self-propelled howitzer (T98)
- M53 self-propelled howitzer (T97)
- M54 self-propelled ?
- M55 self-propelled howitzer
- M56 self-propelled gun (T101)

(Designation jumps to M100 series)

=== Armored cars ===
- M1 armored car (G29) Model T4 Cunningham (1934)
- M2 unknown
- M3 unknown
- M4 unknown
- M5 armored car (G134)
- M6 armored car (G122)
- M7 armored car (G133)
- M8 armored car (G136) (Greyhound) T22
- (M9 halftrack car)?
- M10 redesignated M20 Armored Utility Car T26 (G176)
- M38 Wolfhound, 37 mm, 6 × 6

=== Scout cars ===
- M1 scout car (G31)
- M2 scout car (G32)
- M3 scout car (G67)
- M4 scout car (G66)

=== Half-tracks ===
- M1 car, halftrack, (T1E1) 1933, Cadillac 8-cylinder, 115 HP. (33 produced)
- M2 half-track truck, (T9) (Ford)
- M2 half-track car, (T14) Autocar, White Motor Co.
- M3 half-track, Autocar, White Motor Co.
- M4 81 mm mortar carriage
- M5 half-track variant of M2 half-track car built by International Harvester
- M9 half-track car
- M15 half-track multiple gun carriage built by Autocar
- M21 mortar carrier, 81mm

=== Pre-consecutive tractors ===
- M1 light tractor
- M1 medium tractor
- M1 heavy tractor
- M2 light tractor
- M2 medium tractor
- M2 heavy tractor

Tractor cranes

- M1 tractor crane, 1-ton, (G108) – International Harvester, T-6
- M2 unknown
- M3 tractor crane, 2-ton, (G69) - Caterpillar D6
- M4 tractor crane, 6-ton, (G126) - Caterpillar D7
- M5 tractor crane, 2-ton, (G99) - International Harvester T-9

High-speed

- M1 unknown
- M2 high-speed tractor (G111)
- M3 unknown
- M4 tractor, full-track, high-speed, 18-ton (G150)
  - M4A1 tractor, full-track, high-speed, 18-ton
  - M4A1C tractor, full-track, high-speed, 18-ton
  - M4A2 tractor, full-track, high-speed, 18-ton
  - M4C tractor, full-track, high-speed, 18-ton
- M5 tractor, full-track, high-speed, 13-ton (G162)
  - M5A1 tractor, full-track, high-speed, 13-ton
  - M5A2 tractor, full-track, high-speed, 13-ton
  - M5A3 tractor, full-track, high-speed, 13-ton
  - M5A4 tractor, full-track, high-speed, 13-ton
- M6 tractor, full-track, high-speed, 38-ton (G184)
- M7 snow tractor, search & rescue, half-track (G194) (Allis-Chalmers)
- M8 tractor (G266)
  - M8A1 tractor, full-track, high-speed
  - M8A2 tractor, full-track, high-speed

=== Pre-consecutive trucks ===
- M1 AA prime mover (Corbitt), (GMC T95), 1931 (G28)
- M1 1/2-ton, 4 × 2, Bomb service
- M1 1-ton, 4 × 2, Bomb service, (G85)
- M1 6-ton, 6 × 6, heavy wrecker, (G116)
- M1 artillery repair, COE, van, 1 1/2 to 3-ton, 4 × 4 (G82)
- M1 automotive repair, COE, van, 1 1/2 to 3-ton, 4 × 4 (G83)
- M1 Bomb service, (G85)
- M1 chemical service, GMC CCKW 2½-ton 6×6 truck
- M1 earth auger,
- M1 emergency repair (G61) – Dodge WC-41
- M1 light machine shop, (G16)
- M1 small arms repair, COE, van, 1 1/2 to 3-ton, 4 × 4 (G72)
- M1 spare parts, COE, van, 1 1/2 to 3-ton, 4 × 4 (G84)
- M1 tank maintenance, COE, van, 1 1/2 to 3-ton, 4 × 4 (G91)
- M1 heavy wrecking, (G63)
- M2 artillery repair, COE, van, 1 1/2 to 3-ton, 4 × 4 (G82)
- M2 automotive repair, COE, van, 1 1/2 to 3-ton, 4 × 4 (G83)
- M2 emergency repair (G61) – Dodge WC-60
- M2 spare parts, COE, van, 1 1/2 to 3-ton, 4 × 4 (G84)
- M2 tool and bench, COE, van, 1 1/2 to 3-ton, 4 × 4 (G58)
- M2 welding, COE, van, 1 1/2 to 3-ton, 4 × 4 (G59)
- M3 light machine shop, COE, van, 1 1/2 to 3-ton, 4 × 4 (G57)
- M3 welding, COE, van, 1 1/2 to 3-ton, 4 × 4 (G59)
- M4 machine shop, COE, van, 1 1/2 to 3-ton, 4 × 4 (G57)
- M5 unknown
- M6 1 1/2-ton, bomb service truck (G85)
- M7 small arms repair, GMC CCKW 2½-ton 6×6 truck
- M8 automotive repair, GMC CCKW 2½-ton 6×6 truck
- M9 artillery repair, GMC CCKW 2½-ton 6×6 truck
- M10 instrument repair, GMC CCKW 2½-ton 6×6 truck
- M11 not used
- M12 welding, GMC CCKW 2½-ton 6×6 truck
- M13 tool and bench, GMC CCKW 2½-ton 6×6 truck
- M14 spare parts, GMC CCKW 2½-ton 6×6 truck
- M15 unknown
- M16 machine shop, GMC CCKW 2½-ton 6×6 truck
- M17 unknown
- M18 electrical repair, GMC CCKW 2½-ton 6×6 truck
- M19 tank transporter (G159); M9 trailer and M20 tractor
- M20 prime mover, 12-ton, Diamond T, (G159) – M19 tank transporter
- M21 unknown
- M22 lift, (G161)
- M23 instrument bench, GMC CCKW 2½-ton 6×6 truck
- M24 unknown
- M25 tank transporter, tank transporter/recovery vehicle, nicknamed "Dragon Wagon:. M26 tractor + M15 trailer. Used from 1944 to 1945
- M26 tractor, 12-ton, armored cab. Tractor component of the "Dragon Wagon" tank transporter
- M27 bomb service, GMC CCKW 2½-ton 6×6 truck
- M28 unknown
- M29 unknown
- M30 signal corps repair, GMC CCKW 2½-ton 6×6 truck
- M31 signal corps repair, GMC CCKW 2½-ton 6×6 truck
- M32 tire repair, GMC CCKW 2½-ton 6×6 truck
- M33 unknown
- M34 truck, cargo, long wheelbase, 11.00×20", 6ea, 6 × 6 (M44 chassis) (G742) – M35 series 2½-ton 6×6 cargo truck
- M35 truck, cargo, 2 1/2-ton, 6 × 6, (G742) – M35 series 2½-ton 6×6 cargo truck
  - M35A1 truck, cargo, 2 1/2-ton, 6 × 6
  - M35A2 truck, cargo, 2 1/2-ton, 6 × 6
  - M35A3 truck, cargo, 2 1/2-ton, 6 × 6
- M36 truck, cargo, 2 1/2-ton, 6 × 6, XLWB (G742) – M35 series 2½-ton 6×6 cargo truck
- M37 truck, cargo, 3/4-ton, 4 × 4 (G741) – Dodge M37
  - M37B1 truck, cargo, 3/4-ton, 4 × 4 (G741)
- M38 truck, 3/4-ton, 4 × 4, Utility, (G740) – Willys M38
- M39 truck, chassis, 5-ton, 6 × 6 (G744) – M39 series 5-ton 6×6 truck
- M40 truck, chassis, 5-ton, 6 × 6 (G744) – M39 series 5-ton 6×6 truck
- M41 truck, cargo, 5-ton, 6 x 6 (G744) – M39 series 5-ton 6×6 truck
- M42 truck, command, 3/4-ton, 4 × 4 (G741) – Dodge M37
- M43 truck, ambulance, 3/4-ton, 4 × 4 (G741) – Dodge M37
- M44 truck, chassis, 2 1/2-ton, 6 × 6 (G742) – M35 series 2½-ton 6×6 cargo truck
- M45 truck, chassis, 2 1/2-ton, 6 × 6 (G742) – M35 series 2½-ton 6×6 cargo truck
- M46C truck, chassis, 2 1/2-ton, 6 × 6 (G742) – M35 series 2½-ton 6×6 cargo truck heating and tie down unit for Honest John
- M47 truck, dump truck chassis (G742) – M35 series 2½-ton 6×6 cargo truck
- M48 truck, tractor (G742) – M35 series 2½-ton 6×6 cargo truck
- M49 truck, tank, 6 × 6, Fuel Servicing (G742) – M35 series 2½-ton 6×6 cargo truck
  - M49C truck, tank, 6 × 6, Fuel Servicing
  - M49A1C truck, tank, 6 × 6, Fuel Servicing
  - M49A2C truck, tank, 6 × 6, Fuel Servicing
- M50 truck, tank, 2 1/2-ton, 6 × 6, Water, 1,000 Gal (G742) – M35 series 2½-ton 6×6 cargo truck
- M51 truck, dump, 5-ton, 6 × 6 (G744) – M39 series 5-ton 6×6 truck
- M52 truck, tractor, 5-ton, 6 × 6 (G744) – M39 series 5-ton 6×6 truck
- M53 chassis, truck, 3/4-ton 4 × 4 (G741) – Dodge M37
- M54 truck, cargo, 5-ton, 6 × 6 (G744) – M39 series 5-ton 6×6 truck
- M55 truck, cargo, XLWB, 5-ton, 6 × 6 (G744) – M39 series 5-ton 6×6 truck
- M56 chassis, truck, 3/4-ton 4 × 4 (G741) – Dodge M37 (emergency repair)
  - M56B1 truck, chassis, 3/4-ton, 4 × 4 (G741)
  - M56C truck, chassis, 3/4-ton, 4 × 4 (G741)
- M57 truck chassis (G742) – M35 series 2½-ton 6×6 cargo truck
- M58 truck chassis (G742) – M35 series 2½-ton 6×6 cargo truck
- M59 truck, dump (G742) – M35 series 2½-ton 6×6 cargo truck
- M60 truck, wrecker, light (G742) – M35 series 2½-ton 6×6 cargo truck
- M61 truck, chassis, 5-ton, 6 × 6 (G744) – M39 series 5-ton 6×6 truck
- M62 truck, wrecker, 5-ton, 6 × 6 (G744) – M39 series 5-ton 6×6 truck
- M63 truck, chassis, 5-ton, 6 × 6 (G744) – M39 series 5-ton 6×6 truck
- M64 truck, cargo van, 5-ton, 6 × 6 (G744) – M39 series 5-ton 6×6 truck
- M65 unknown
- M66 unknown

=== Pre-consecutive trailers ===
- M1 instrument trailer, (G26) for director or generator (3 inch AA)
- M1 searchlight trailer (G221)
- M1 chemical /bomb trailer 4-ton (G74)
- M2 instrument trailer, (director only), (3 inch AA)
- M2A1 generator trailer, (generator only), (3 inch AA)
- M2 chemical /bomb trailer 4-ton (G74)
- M3 unknown
- M4 artillery plotting room trailer (G155)
- M5 bomb trailer, 2 1/2-ton, 3-wheel (G74)
- M6 tractor crane (G117)
- M7 2-ton generator trailer (G221)
- M8 armored ammunition, (G157)
- M9 trailer, tank, 45-ton with integrated dolly (G159) – M19 tank transporter
- M10 trailer, ammunition, 2-wheel (G660)
- M11 unknown
- M12 tractor crane
- M13 2-ton directors, soft top (G221)
- M14 2-ton directors, hard top (G221)
- M15 semi-trailer, transporter, 40-ton, 8-wheel (G160) – M25 tank transporter "Dragon Wagon"
  - M15A2 semi trailer, tank transport, 50-ton, 8-wheeled
- M16 clamshell bucket, for M2 crane (G201)
- M17 2-ton, quadmount (G221)
- M18 2-ton, generator (G221)
- M19 snow trailer, 1-ton (G195); trailer for M7 snow tractor
- M20 quadmount (G220)
- M21 trailer, ammunition, 4-ton, 2-wheel (G213)
- M22 2-ton directors hard top (G221)
- M23 trailer, ammunition, 8-ton, 4-wheel (G216)
- M24 ammunition – Ben Hur trailer
- M25 tire repair – Ben Hur trailer
- M26 semitrailer, 7-ton (G713)
- M27 unknown
- M28 unknown
- M29 bomb trailer, 3/4-ton, 1-axle (G240)
- M30 semitrailer, 6-ton payload, 10-ton gross, 2-wheel (F2B semitrailer, 2,000 gal. guel servicing, HeilCo) (G678)
- M31 unknown

=== Tankdozer kits ===
- M1 La Plant bulldozer for M4 Sherman (G228)
- M2 La Plant bulldozer for M4 Sherman (G228)
- M3 bulldozer for M46 Patton (G246)
- M4 bulldozer for M24 Chaffee (G265)
- M5 bulldozer for T8E4, and M8 high speed tractor
- M6 bulldozer for M47 Patton (G286)
- M7 unknown
- M8 bulldozer for M48 Patton (G278)
- M9 bulldozer for M60 (G306)

== M100 to M199 ==
- M100 trailer, 2-wheel, cargo, 1/4-ton (G747, 1951)
- M101 trailer, cargo, 3/4-ton, 2-wheel (G748)
  - M101A1 trailer, cargo, 3/4-ton, 2-wheeled
  - M101A2 trailer, cargo, 3/4-ton, 2-wheeled
  - M101A3 trailer, cargo, 3/4-ton, 2-wheeled
- M102 chassis, trailer, 1 1/2-ton, 2-wheel (G754)
  - M102A1 chassis, trailer, 1 1/2-ton, 2-wheeled
  - M102A2 chassis, trailer, 1 1/2-ton, 2-wheeled
- M102 Vehicle, engineer armored, front mount crane, (M47 chassis), (1955)
- M103 chassis, trailer, 1 1/2-ton, 2-wheeled (G754)
  - M103A1 trailer, cargo, 2-wheeled
  - M103A2 trailer, generator, 60-cycle × 2, 2-wheeled
- M103 tank, combat, full-track, 120 mm, 60-ton
  - M103A1 tank, combat, full-track, gun w/bore evacuator, 120 mm, 63-ton
  - M103A1E1 tank, experimental, f-t, M60 engine, transmission, fire control
- XM104 self-propelled gun, combat, full-track, 105 mm, 4-ton, (1961)
- M104 trailer, cargo, 1 1/2-ton, 2-wheeled (M102 chassis) (G754)
  - M104A1 trailer, cargo, 1 1/4-ton, 2-wheeled
  - M104A2 trailer, cargo, 1 1/4-ton, 2-wheeled
- M105 trailer, cargo, 1 1/2-ton, 2-wheeled (M102 chassis) (G754)
  - M105A1 trailer, cargo, 1 1/2-ton, 2-wheeled
  - M105A2 trailer, cargo, 1 1/2-ton, 2-wheeled
- M106 mortar carrier, self-propelled, full-track, 4.2-inch
  - M106A1 mortar carrier, self-propelled, improved, diesel engine, f-t, 4.2-inch
- M106 trailer, tank: water, 1 1/2-ton, 2-wheeled, 400 Gal (M102 chassis) (G754)
  - M106A1 trailer, tank: water, 1 1/2-ton, 2-wheeled, 400 Gal
  - M106A2 trailer, tank: water, 1 1/2-ton, 2-wheeled, 400 Gal
- M107 field artillery, self-propelled, f-t, 175 mm, air-transportable
  - M107E1 field artillery, S-P, f-t, improved cooling, hydraulic, 175 mm
- M107 trailer, tank: water, 1 1/2-ton, 2-wheeled, 400 Gal (M102 chassis) (G754)
  - M107A1 trailer, tank: water, 1 1/2-ton, 2-wheeled, 400 Gal
  - M107A2 trailer, tank: water, 1 1/2-ton, 2-wheeled, 400 Gal
- M108 howitzer, self-propelled, light, 105 mm, range 15,000 m
- M108 truck, crane, 2 1/2-ton, 6 × 6 (G742) – M35 series 2½-ton 6×6 cargo truck
- M108 truck, radio repair, 2 1/2-ton, 6 × 6
- M109 howitzer, S-P, full-track, 155 mm, range 18,500 m, (1962)
  - M109A1 howitzer, self-propelled, medium, f-t, 8 ft longer barrel, 155 mm
  - M109A2 howitzer, self-propelled, medium, f-t, 8 ft longer barrel, 155 mm
  - M109G howitzer, S-P, horizontal sliding breech, (export to Switzerland)
- M109 truck, van, 6 × 6, shop (G742) – M35 series 2½-ton 6×6 cargo truck
- M109 truck, shop van, REO OA331 gas, 2 1/2-ton, 6 × 6
  - M109A1 truck, shop van, LDS-427 multifuel, 2 1/2-ton, 6 × 6
  - M109A2 truck, shop van, LDT-465 multifuel, 2 1/2-ton, 6 × 6
  - M109A3 truck, shop van, LDT-465, multifuel,2 1/2-ton, 6 × 6
- M110 howitzer, S-P, heavy, f-t, 8-inch, nuclear ammo, (1961)
  - M110E1 howitzer, S-P, improved engine cooling, hydraulic, 8-inch
  - M110E2 howitzer, self-propelled, extended tube, 8-inch
- M113 carrier, personnel, full-track, armored, 40 mph, range 300 mi
  - M113A1 carrier, personnel, diesel engine, full-track, armored, (1962)
  - M113C carrier, prototype, smaller version, remote controlled gun, 20 mm
  - M113C+R carrier, export, sold to Netherlands, (1965)
  - M113C+R carrier, export, sold to Canada, (1969)
  - M113E1 carrier, personnel, GE gas turbine engine, full-track, armored
  - M113E2 carrier, personnel, diesel engine, full-track, armored
  - M113 1/2 (Lynx reconnaissance vehicle)
- M113 trailer, chassis, 3-ton, (G842) PGM-19 Jupiter
- M114 trailer, low bed, 3-ton, (G842) PGM-19 Jupiter
- M114 carrier, command and reconnaissance, f-t, armored, air-droppable, (1962)
  - M114A1 carrier, command and reconnaissance, f-t, armored, side skirts eliminated, remote-controlled M2HB cupola, .50 cal
  - M114A1 carrier, reconnaissance, f-t, remote-controlled HS 120 gun, 20 mm, (1968)
  - M114A1 carrier, reconnaissance, f-t, new engine, transmission, torsion, (1973)
  - M114A1E1 carrier, reconnaissance, f-t, HS 820 gun, 20 mm, (1965)
  - M114A2 carrier, reconnaissance, f-t, modified gun cupola, 20 mm. (1965)
- M115 trailer, chassis, 1/4-ton, 2-wheel (G747); chassis version of M100 trailer
- M116 chassis: trailer, 3/4-ton, 2-wheel (G748); chassis version of M101 trailer photos m116 trailer.php
- M116 carrier, cargo, f-t, soft skin, amphibious, Husky
- M116 carrier, personnel, full-track, steel armor not aluminum
- M117 chassis, semitrailer, 6-ton, single axle (G751)
- M118 semitrailer, stake, 6-ton, single axle (M117 chassis) (G751)
  - M118A1 semitrailer, Stake, 6-ton, single axle
- M119 semitrailer, van, 6-ton, single axle, 2-wheel (M117 chassis) (G751)
  - M119A1 semi trailer, van, 6-ton, 2-wheeled
- M123 truck, tractor, 10-ton, 6 × 6 (G792)
  - M123A1 truck, tractor, diesel, 10-ton, 6 × 6
  - M123A1C truck, tractor w/w 45,000 lb, Cummins V8 diesel, 10-ton, 6 × 6
- M124 truck, radio repair shop, 2 1/2-ton, 6 × 6
- M125 truck, cargo, 10-ton, 6 × 6 (G792)
- M125 carrier, self-propelled, full-track, mortar, 81 mm
- M125A1 carrier, self-propelled, diesel engine, full-track, mortar, 81 mm
- M126 chassis, semitrailer, 12-ton, 4-wheel (G750)
- M127 semitrailer, stake, 12-ton, 4-wheel (M126 chassis) (G750)
- M127A1 semi trailer, cargo, 12-ton, 4-wheel
- M128 semitrailer, van, 12-ton, Cargo, 4-wheel (M126 chassis) (G750)
  - M128A1 semitrailer, van, 12-ton, Cargo, 4-wheel
  - M128A1C semitrailer, van, 12-ton, Cargo, 4-wheel
  - M128A2C semitrailer, van, 12-ton, Cargo, 4-wheel
- M129 semitrailer, van, 12-ton, cargo, 4-wheel (M126 chassis) (G750)
  - M129A1 semitrailer, van, 12-ton, cargo, 4-wheel
  - M129A1C semitrailer, van, 12-ton, cargo, 4-wheel
  - M129A2C semitrailer, van, 12-ton, cargo, 4-wheel
- M131A2 semitrailer, tank, fuel servicing, 5000 gal, 12-ton, 4-wheel (G755 & G888)
- M132 truck, medical van (G742) – M35 series 2½-ton 6×6 cargo truck
- M132 flame thrower, self-propelled, full-track, (M113 chassis)
  - M132A1 flame thrower, self-propelled, f-t, range 170 m, (M113A1 chassis)
  - M132E1 flame thrower, self-propelled, full-track, 11 3/4-ton
- M133 truck, kitchen, 2 1/2-ton, 6 × 6, (Only made for Canadian Army. Kitchen Truck)
- M135 truck, cargo, 2 1/2-ton, 6 × 6 (G749)
- M139 truck, Bridging, 5-ton, 6 x 6 (G744) – M39 series 5-ton 6×6 truck
- M139 truck, chassis, 5-ton, 6 x 6 (G744) – M39 series 5-ton 6×6 truck
- XM142 truck, bomb handling, (G741) – Dodge M37
- M143A1 trailer, bomb-transport, 2-ton, 4-wheeled
- M146C semitrailer, van, shop, 6-ton, 2-wheel (G824)
- XM147 truck, amphibious, 2 1/2-ton, 6 × 6, "Super DUKW" (G814); based on M135
- XM148 truck, amphibious, 5-ton, 6 × 6, "Gull" (ACF-Brill)
- M149 trailer, water, 400 gal, 2-wheeled (Water Buffalo) (G877)
  - M149A1 trailer, water, 400 gal, 2-wheeled
  - M149A2 trailer, water, 400 gal, 2-wheeled
- M151 Jeep, utility, 1/4-ton, 4 × 4, 65 mph (G838)
  - M151A1 Jeep, utility, 1/4-ton, 4 × 4, (1963)
  - M151A1C Jeep, utility, 1/4-ton, 4 × 4, with M40A1 (Recoilless rifle, 106 mm)
  - M151A2 Jeep, utility, 1/4-ton, 4 × 4, (1970)
- M152 truck, panel, utility, 3/4-ton, 4 × 4, (Limited procurement by USAF. Radio/Command Truck), (G741) – Dodge M37
- XM157 truck, amphibious, 8-ton, 8 × 8, "Drake", GMC
- M160 tank transporter, trailer, 60-ton, (G791)
- M162 carrier, self-propelled, Vulcan gun, f-t, armored, (M113A1)
- M163 carrier, self-propelled, Vulcan gun, f-t, armored, (M113)
- M164 semitrailer, office van, 6-ton, (G751)
- XM166 AA gun (from M42 Duster) mounted on M548
- M170 truck, ambulance, front line, 1/4-ton, 4 × 4 (G758)
- M172 semitrailer, low bed, 15-ton, 4-wheel (G797)
  - M172A1 semitrailer, low bed, 25-ton, 4-wheel
- M173 tank transporter, trailer, 25-ton (G790)
- M179 self-propelled howitzer, 155mm,
- M185 truck, van, 2 1/2-ton, 6 × 6, Shop (G742) – M35 series 2½-ton 6×6 cargo truck
- M185A3 truck, repair shop van, 2 1/2-ton, 6 × 6
- M190 truck, cargo, 10-ton, 8 × 8, Sterling,
- M193 truck, cargo, 15-ton, 8 × 8, Sterling
- M194 truck, tractor, 15-ton, 8 × 8, Kenworth
- XM195 truck, cargo, 3/4-ton, 4 × 4, (compact M37) – Dodge M37
- M195E1 howitzer, self-propelled, full-track, 105 mm
- M197 dolly, trailer converter, 6-ton, 2-wheel (G800)
- M198 dolly, trailer converter, 8-ton, 2-wheel (G800)
- M199 dolly, trailer converter, 18-ton (G811)

== M200 to M299 ==
- M200 chassis: trailer 2 1/2-ton, single axle (G756)
- M201 truck, telephone maintenance, 3/4-ton, Dodge M37
- M207 truck, chassis, 2 1/2-ton, 6 × 6, (G749)
- M209 truck, chassis, 2 1/2-ton, 6 × 6, (G749)
- M211 truck, cargo, 2 1/2-ton, 6 × 6, dual wheel (G749)
- M215 truck, dump, 2 1/2-ton, 6 × 6 (G749)
- M216 truck, gasoline tank, 2 1/2-ton, 6 × 6
- M217 truck, gasoline tank, 2 1/2-ton, 6 × 6 (G749)
- M217C truck, tank, fuel serving, 2 1/2-ton, 6 × 6
- M220 truck, shop van, 2 1/2-ton, 6 × 6 (G749)
  - M220C truck, shop van, 2 1/2-ton, 6 × 6
  - M220D truck, shop van, 2 1/2-ton, 6 × 6
- M221 truck, tractor, 2 1/2-ton, 6 × 6 (G749)
- M222 truck, water tank, 2 1/2-ton, 1000 gal, 6 × 6 (G749)
- M238 truck, instrument repair shop, (G749)
- M242 trailer, M33 fire control, radar dish mount, 2-ton, (G789) Nike Ajax
- M243 trailer, M33 fire control, antina hauler, 2-ton, (G789) Nike Ajax
- M244 trailer, M33 fire control, computer van, 2-ton, (G789) Nike Ajax
- M246 truck, tractor, wrecker, 5-ton, 6 × 6 (G744) – M39 series 5-ton 6×6 truck
  - M246A1 truck, tractor, wrecker, 5-ton, 6 × 6
  - M246A2 truck, tractor, wrecker, 5-ton, 6 × 6
- (Note for M247 Sergeant York see M988)
- M249 truck, gun-lifting, heavy, (front), M65 Atomic Cannon
- M250 truck, gun-lifting, heavy, (rear), (G268) M65 Atomic Cannon
- M254 truck, missile rocket motor, Nike Ajax
- M255 truck, body section, Nike Ajax
- M256 truck, inert, Nike Ajax
- M257 truck, inert, Nike Ajax
- M258A1 trailer, radar-tracking van, 4-dual wheels (G789)
- M259A1 trailer, Nike Hercules director station, 4-dual wheels (G789)
- M260 trailer, drop bed, antenna mount, Nike (G789)
- M261A1 trailer, guided-missile flatbed, booster, 4-dual wheels (G789)
- M262 trailer, launch control van, (G789) Nike
- M268 truck, propellant servicing, 5-ton, 6 × 6, MGM-5 Corporal
- M269 semitrailer, low bed, 12-ton, wrecker, 4-wheel (G802)
- M270 semitrailer, low bed, 12-ton, wrecker, 4-wheel (G802)
- (for M270 launcher see M993)
- M271 trailer, pole transporter, 3 1/2-ton (K-36), (G782)
- M273 truck, 5-ton, 6 × 6,
- M274 carrier, light weapons, Infantry, 4-cylinder Willys, 1/2-ton
  - M274A1 carrier, light weapons, Infantry, 106 mm platform, 1/2-ton, 25 mph
  - M274A2 truck, platform, utility, magnesium frame, 1/2-ton, 4 × 4
  - M274A3 truck, platform, utility, 2-cylinder 2AO42, M274 upgrade
  - M274A4 truck, platform, utility, 2-cylinder 2AO42, M274A1 upgrade
  - M274A5 truck, platform, utility, aluminum frame replacing magnesium, 4 × 4
- M275 truck, tractor, 2 1/2-ton, 6 × 6 (G742) – M35 series 2½-ton 6×6 cargo truck
  - M275A1 truck, tractor, 2 1/2-ton, 6 × 6 (G742)
  - M275A2 truck, tractor, 2 1/2-ton, 6 × 6 (G742)
- M278 semitrailer, water tank, 2000 gal. (G817)
- M280 truck, servicing platform, (M39 truck) MGM-5 Corporal
- M282 truck, cargo, 5-ton, 8 × 8, REO
- M283 truck, cargo, export, LWB, 3/4-ton, 4 × 4, (LWB M37)
- M284 truck, fire control system, test shop, (G749)
- M289 truck, missile launcher, 5-ton 6 x 6 (G744), Honest John (note – for vehicle mounted rocket launchers see List of U.S. Army rocket launchers)
- M291 truck, van, expandable, 5-ton, 6 × 6 (G744) – M39 series 5-ton 6×6 truck
- M292 truck, van, 2 1/2-ton, Expansible (G742) – M35 series 2½-ton 6×6 cargo truck
  - M292A1 truck, van, extendable, 2 1/2-ton, 6 × 6
  - M292A2 truck, extendable, 2 1/2-ton, 6 × 6
- M295 chassis, semitrailer, 6-ton, 4-wheel (G819)
- M296 trailer, utility, 2 1/2-ton,

== M300 to M399 ==
- M301 truck, air compressor, Corporal missile
- M304 trailer, electronic shop, Nike Ajax
- M305 bicycle, men's, (G519)
- M306 bicycle, women's, (G519)
- M308 semitrailer, tank, water, 1000 gal, 4-wheeled (G750)
- M310 cable reel trailer, 3 1/2-ton (K-37B), 2-wheel, 1955 (G813)
- M311 trailer, warhead guided missile, 4-wheel. MGM-5 Corporal
- M313 semitrailer, van, expansible, 6-ton, two-axle, 4-wheel (G819)
- M323 semi trailer, tracking station van, AN/MPQ-12, MGM-5 Corporal
- M324 trailer, Doppler station van, AN/MRQ-7, MGM-5 Corporal
- M325 trailer, computer station van, AN/MSA-6, MGM-5 Corporal
- M328 truck, bridging, 5-ton, 6 × 6, (G744) – M39 series 5-ton 6×6 truck
- M329 trailer, rocket transporter, (G821) Honest John
- M332 trailer, ammunition: 1/2-ton, 2-wheel (G660)
- M342 truck, dump, 2 1/2-ton, 6 × 6, (M35A2 chassis) – M35 series 2½-ton 6×6 cargo truck
- M345 flat-bed trailer, 10-ton, 2-Axle, 4-wheel (G816)
- M346 semitrailer, tank transporter, 60-ton, 8-wheel, Dorsey
- M347 semitrailer, refrigerator, 15-ton, (G856)
- M348 semitrailer, van, electronic, tactical, 6-ton, 28-foot, 2-wheel, (G833 & G848) V-189 trailer, for AN/MSC-25
- M349 semitrailer, van, refrigerator, 7 1/2-ton, single-axle, 2-wheel (G815 & G820)
- M350 truck, air servicer, MGM-5 Corporal
- M353 trailer, chassis, GP, 3 1/2-ton, 2-wheeled, NSN 2330-00-542-2831 (G854)
- M354 dolly, trailer converter, 18-ton, 4-wheel (G872)
- M357 truck, cargo, 4-ton, 8 × 8, Teracruser, FWD
- M359 trailer, electronic shop van, 3-ton, (G789) Nike
- M363 dolly, trailer converter, 7 1/2-ton
- M364 dolly, trailer converter, 6-ton,
- M365 dolly, trailer converter, 10-ton (G676)
- M367 trailer, maintenance, telephone cable splicer, 1/4-ton (K-38), 2-wheel (G747) – Jeep trailer
- M373 semitrailer, van, electronic, tactical, 6-ton, 30-foot, 4-wheel (G833 & G878)
- M375 truck, tractor, 25-ton, 8 × 8, REO
- M376 truck, tractor, 25-ton, 8 × 8, Detroit Arsenal
- M377 truck, tractor, 25-ton, 8 × 8, Detroit Arsenal
- M381 truck, cargo, 2-ton, 4 × 4, (G742)
- M382 trailer, electronic shop van, (G789) Nike
- M383 trailer, electronic shop van, (G789) Nike
- M384 truck, cargo, 1-ton, 8 × 8, (G838)
- M386 truck, missile launcher, 5-ton, 6 x 6, Honest John – M39 series 5-ton 6×6 truck
- M387 truck, guided missile launcher, 2 1/2-ton 6 x 6 (based on M44), MGM-18 Lacrosse
- M388 semi trailer, tank, 3,000 gal, 2-wheeled, alcohol, PGM-11 Redstone
- M389 trailer, w/missile test body kit, 1-ton, 2-wheeled, (G840)
- M390C trailer, chassis, 2-ton, 2-wheeled, (G839)
- M394 semitrailer, medical van, 3-ton, (G833)
- M398 truck, guided missile launcher, 2 1/2-ton 6 x 6 (based on M45), MGM-18 Lacrosse

== M400 to M499 ==
- XM401, truck, 4-ton, FWD; development of XM357, later known as MM-1
- M405 handling unit, trailer-mounted, MGR-1 Honest John
- M406 antenna trailer, Nike
- XM408 truck utility, 3/4-ton, 6 × 6; based on the M151 ¼-ton 4×4 utility truck
- XM409 truck, 10-ton, 8 × 8, International Harvester
- XM410 truck, 2 1/2-ton, 8 x 8, Chrysler
- M411 truck shop van, MGM-18 Lacrosse
- M412 truck shop van, MGM-18 Lacrosse
- M416 trailer, cargo, 1/4-ton, 2-wheeled (G857) (1962)
  - M416A1 trailer, cargo, 1/4-ton, 2-wheeled, (1976)
  - M416B1 trailer, cargo, 1/4-ton, 2-wheeled
- M417 trailer, cargo, 1-ton (G875)
- M420 trailer, MGR-3 Little John
- M422 'Mighty Mite' truck, utility, lightweight, 1/4-ton, 4 × 4 (G843) (1959)
  - M422A1 'Mighty Mite' truck, utility, lightweight, 1/4-ton, 4 × 4, (1960), 6 inch longer
- M423 ambulance, 1 1/2-ton 4 × 2, (G731)
- M424 trailer van, directors station (G789) Nike
- M425 truck, 5-ton, tractor, 4 x 2 (G671)
- M426 truck, 5-ton, tractor, 4 x 2 (G671)
- M427 truck, cargo, 2 1/2-ton, 18-foot GMC (G508) – AFKWX-353
- M428 trailer van, radar tracking station, Nike
- M429 dolly, for Nike trailers
- M430 dolly, trailer, rear, for Nike trailers
- M431 dolly, trailer, front, for Nike trailers
- M432 dolly, trailer, rear, for Nike trailers
- M434 truck, cargo, 3 1/2-ton, 6 × 6
- XM437 truck, cargo, 15-ton Le Tourneau-Westinghouse (G860) – M520 Goer
- XM438 truck, fuel tanker, 5000-Gal, Le Tourneau-Westinghouse (G860) – M520 Goer
- M442 truck, guided missile, rocket motor, Nike Hercules
- M443 truck, cargo, 3/4-ton, 4 × 4, Willys mule
- M447 semitrailer, van, shop, folding sides, 4-wheel (G819)
  - M447C semitrailer, van, shop, folding sides, 4-wheel
- M448 trailer, shop van (M103A3 chassis) (G754)
- M451 truck, guided missile test set, Nike Hercules
- XM453E1 truck, cargo, 5-ton, 8 × 8, GMC
- XM453E2 truck, cargo, 5-ton, 8 × 8, Ford
- XM453E3 truck, cargo, 5-ton, 8 × 8, REO
- M454 trailer, chassis (G849)
- M455 trailer, low bed, 5-ton, (G842) PGM-19 Jupiter
- M456 trailer, chassis, 5-ton (G842) PGM-19 Jupiter
- M457 semitrailer, maintenance, weapon mechanical unit (G751)
- M458 semitrailer, maintenance, weapon electrical unit (G751)
- M459 semitrailer, maintenance, weapon connecting unit (G751)
- M460 trailer van, electronic, 5-ton (G842) PGM-19 Jupiter
- M461 trailer van, electronic, 3-ton (G842) PGM-19 Jupiter
- M463 trailer air conditioned, 1 1/2-ton (G871)
- M465 cart assembly, transport, 762mm rocket, MGR-1 Honest John
- M472 truck, van, missile firing data computer (G742) PGM-11 Redstone
- M473 truck, guided missile body section Nike Hercules
- M474 tracked carrier, guided missile equipment, Pershing 1 (G294)
- M477 truck, pneumatic shop, missile system, PGM-11 Redstone
- M478 truck, erector, guided missile, PGM-11 Redstone
- M479 trailer, missile battery shop, PGM-11 Redstone
- M480 trailer, missile body aft section, PGM-11 Redstone
- M481 semitrailer, missile warhead, PGM-11 Redstone
- M482 semitrailer, missile thrust unit, PGM-11 Redstone
- M483 trailer, air servicer, PGM-11 Redstone
- M484 semitrailer, supply office, PGM-11 Redstone
- M486 truck, missile repair parts, PGM-11 Redstone
- M487 trailer, missile repair parts, PGM-11 Redstone
- M488 truck, missile repair parts, PGM-11 Redstone
- M489 truck, missile nose section, Nike Hercules
- M499 semitrailer, van

== M500 to M599 ==
- M501 loader transporter, MIM-23 Hawk
- M503 truck, shop van, MGM-18 Lacrosse
- M504 semitrailer, launch station, MGM-29 Sergeant
- M506 truck, hydrogen peroxide servicer, PGM-11 Redstone – Dodge M37
- M508 semitrailer, shop van, 6-ton, (G751)
- M512 truck, shop van, 2 1/2-ton, 6 × 6 (G742)
- M513 truck, shop van, MGM-18 Lacrosse
- M514 trailer, chassis, 1-ton, 2-wheeled (G839)
- M515 truck, shop van, MGM-18 Lacrosse
- M518 trailer, transporter (G842)
- M520 'Goer', truck, cargo, 8-ton, 4 × 4, articulated (G861)
  - M520E1 carrier, cargo, full-track, 8-ton
- M521A1 howitzer, self-propelled, full-track, air transportable, 105 mm
- XM523E2 truck, tractor, 25-ton, Kenworth (G868)
- M524 semitrailer, 55-ton, 8-wheel (G869)
- M527 semitrailer, low bed, 6-ton (G859)
- M528 dolly, load divider, 35-ton (G870)
- M529 trailer, low bed, 7-ton, missile, Nike (G858)
- M530 truck, fire, 6 × 6, (Kaiser jeep)
- M531 truck, amphibious, 3/4-ton, 4 × 4, AMC, muskrat
- M532 trailer, field laundry
- M533 trailer bakery oven, 2 1/2-ton
- M535 truck, shop van (G508) – GMC CCKW 2½-ton 6×6 truck
- M536 trailer, laundry, 1 1/2-ton (G867)
- M537 trailer, bakery, 2 1/2-ton (G867)
- M538 trailer, dough mixer (G867)
- M539 trailer, chassis, 6-ton (G859)
- M543 truck, wrecker, medium, 5-ton, 6 × 6, Gas Engine (G744) – M39 series 5-ton 6×6 truck
  - M543A1 truck, wrecker, medium, 5-ton, 6 × 6, Mack Engine
  - M543A2 truck, wrecker, medium, 5-ton, 6 × 6, Continental Engine
- XM545 trailer, chassis, 1-ton 2 wheel (G839)
- M546 carrier tracked, guided missile, MIM-46 Mauler
- M548 carrier, cargo, full-tracked, amphibious, 6-ton, (M113 power train)
  - M548A1 carrier, cargo, full-tracked, 6-ton (M113 power train)
- M548E1 Recovery vehicle, with welder kit, full-track, 6-ton (1968)
- M549 quad trac, Michigan Equipment
- M551 'Sheridan' armored airborne reconnaissance assault vehicle, f-t, 152 mm gun or Shillelagh, (entered US service 1969)
- M553 'Goer', truck, wrecker, 10-ton, 4 × 4, articulated, W/W (G861)
  - M553E1 truck, wrecker, 10-ton, 6 × 6
- XM554 truck, wrecker, 20-ton, 4 × 4, Le Tourneau-Westinghouse (G860)
- M555 semitrailer electronics van, 6-ton, 1-axle
- M556 semitrailer electronics shop van, 6-ton, 1-axle
- M557 semitrailer electronics van, 10-ton, 2-axle
- M558 semitrailer electronics van, 10-ton, 2-axle
- M559 'Goer', truck, fuel servicing, 2500 gal., 4 × 4, articulated (G861)
- M561 'Gama Goat' truck, cargo, 1 1/4-ton, 6 × 6 (G874)
- M564 trailer van, electronic shop, 9-ton (G789)
- M565 dolly, trailer, front, for M564 van
- M566 dolly, trailer, rear, for M564 van
- M567 truck van, electronic shop, 2 1/2-ton (G742)
- M569 trailer, chassis, 1/4-ton, (G857)
- M571 carrier, utility, F-T, articulated, (G879), Canadair, Dynatrac
- M572 rocket handler, with M36 truck
- M573 dolly, front, launch control station, (G789) Nike
- XM574 semitrailer, van: electronic, 10-ton, 2 axle, 4 wheel (G883)
- M577 carrier, command post, light, full-track
- M578 light recovery vehicle
- M580 trailer, chassis, 1-ton (G881)
- M581 trailer, chassis, 1 1/2-ton (G881)
- M582 trailer, van, 2-ton (G789)
- M583 trailer, van, 2-ton (G789)
- M584 dolly, trailer, front (G789)
- M585 trailer, cargo, 1/4-ton
- M586 semitrailer, water tank, 2,000-Gal. (G882)
- M589 dolly, trailer, front, electronic (G789)
- M595 dolly, trailer, front, antenna (G789)
- M598 tracked cargo carrier (G295) – M107 self-propelled gun

== M600 to M699 ==
- M600 dolly, trailer, electric shop, rear
- M601 truck, power wagon, US/CANADA air force use, 1-ton, 4 × 4 (G834)
- M602 truck, cargo, 2 1/2-ton, 6 × 6; modified M35
- M603 truck, 1/4-ton, utility 4 × 4 (G847)
- M604 truck, cargo, 3/4-ton (G845)
- M605 truck, cargo 2 1/2-ton (G846)
- M606 truck, utility, 1/4-ton, 4 × 4, modified CJ3B, (G395)
  - M606A2 truck, utility, 1/4-ton, 4 × 4, modified CJ5
  - M606A3 truck, utility, radio, auxiliary 24v power supply, 1/4-ton, 4 × 4
- M607 truck, tractor, 2 1/2-ton, (G835)
- M608 truck, dump, 2 1/2-ton (G835)
- M609 truck, shop van, 2 1/2-ton (G835)
- M610 truck, water tank, 1000 gal. 2 1/2-ton (G835)
- M611 truck, gasoline tanker, 1,200-gal (G835)
- M612 truck, van expansible (G835)
- M613 truck, instrument repair shop (G835)
- M614 truck, dump (G835)
- M615 truck, ambulance, 1-ton, 4 × 4 (G834)
- M616 truck, chassis, 2 1/2-ton, 6 × 6, (G835)
- M617 truck, chassis, 2 1/2-ton, 6 × 6, (G835)
- M618 truck, chassis, 2 1/2-ton, 6 × 6, (G835)
- M619 truck, chassis, 2 1/2-ton, 6 × 6, (G835)
- M620 truck, chassis, 2 1/2-ton, 6 × 6, (G835)
- M621 truck, cargo, export to Norway, 2 1/2-ton, 6 × 6, 11:00 × 20 (G900) – M35 series 2½-ton 6×6 cargo truck
- M622 truck, fuel tank, export to Norway, engine flame heater kit, 6 × 6 (G900)
- M623 truck, van, export to Norway, compressed air diff-lock on 3 axles (G900)
- M624 truck, dump, export to Norway, (details apply to all 4 trucks) (G900)
- M625 trailer, water tank, 400-Gal. (G877)
- M626 truck, tractor 10-ton, (G792)
- M627 semitrailer, tank transporter, jointed, 52 1/2-ton, (G902)
- XM654 semitrailer, van: telemetry equipment, 10-ton, 2-axle, 4-wheel (G883)
- M656 truck, cargo, 5-ton, 8 × 8, Ford (G852)
- M657 trailer, van radar simulator test station, (G789) Nike
- M667 launcher-transporter, Lance guided missile, f-t, armor, (1964) MGM-52 Lance
- M671 semitrailer, van, maintenance, 6-ton (G859)
- M672 semitrailer, van, maintenance, 6-ton (G859)
- M674 semitrailer, low-bed, 15-ton, 4-wheel (G884) Nike system
- M676 truck, cargo, pickup, Kaiser Jeep – FSN 2320-889-2004
- M677 truck, cargo, pickup, 4-door, Kaiser Jeep – FSN 2320-889-2005
- M678 truck, carry all, Kaiser Jeep – FSN 2320-889-2006
- M679 truck, ambulance, Kaiser Jeep – FSN 2320-889-2007
- XM680 semitrailer, van: electronic equipment, 10-ton, 2-axle, 4-wheel (G883)
- M681 semitrailer, van, 15-ton, 4-wheel
- M682 semitrailer, van, transmittal radar, 15-ton, 4-wheel, (G884)
- M683 semitrailer, van, control radar, 15-ton, 4-wheel, (G884)
- M684 semitrailer, van, heat exchanger, 15-ton, 4-wheel, (G884)
- M688 loader transporter, MGM-52 Lance
- M689 dolly set, lift, transportable shelter (G889); includes M690 and M691
- M690 dolly, trailer, front
- M691 dolly, trailer, rear
- M696 tracked recovery vehicle, light, (M548 chassis)
- M699 dolly trailer, rear, (G789) Nike

== M700 to M799 ==
- M701 mechanized infantry combat vehicle, Pacific Car and Foundry
- M705 truck, cargo, 1 1/4-ton, (G905), Chevrolet
- M706 car, armored, light, (V-100 Cadillac Gage Commando)
- M707 dolly, set transportable shelter
- XM708 truck, dump, 3/4-ton (G741) – Dodge M37
- M709 trailer, stake/platform, 3/4-ton
- M710 scooter, rough terrain
- XM711 truck, wrecker, 3/4-ton, (G741) – Dodge M37
- M712 trailer, aircraft loading, 3 1/2-ton
- M713 motor scooter,
- M714 tractor, flat bed, tilt loading, 6-ton
- M715 truck, cargo, troops, 1 1/4-ton, 4 × 4 (G890)
- M716 trailer, maintenance: telephone cable splicer, 1/4-ton (G857)
- M718 truck, ambulance, front-line, 1/4-ton, 4 × 4
  - M718A1 truck, ambulance, front-line, 1/4-ton, (1970)
- M720 dolly set, lift, transportable shelter: 3-ton (G898); includes M721, M722
- M721 dolly, front
- M722 dolly, rear
- M723 mechanized infantry combat vehicle, (FMC)
- M724 truck, cab and chassis, 1 1/4-ton, 4 × 4, (G890)
- M725 truck, ambulance, 1 1/4-ton, 4 × 4, w/o winch (G890)
- M726 truck, maintenance, 1 1/4-ton, NSN 2320-921-6379, w/winch (G890)
- M727 carrier, guided missile, Hawk missile
- M728 combat engineer vehicle
- M729 tank, combat assault vehicle, (M116 Husky)
- M730 carrier, self-propelled, guided missile, MIM-72 Chaparral, Sidewinder × 4
- M732 carrier, self-propelled, Vulcan gun, f-t, armor, (M113A1 chassis)
- M733 carrier, cargo, amphibious, f-t, (M116 Husky)
- M734 mechanized infantry combat vehicle, (FMC)
- M737 truck, ambulance, 1 1/4-ton, Chevrolet (G905)
- XM738 semitrailer, van: telephone equipment, 6-ton, 4-wheel (G883)
- XM739 semitrailer, van: switchboard equipment, 6-ton, 4-wheel (G883)
- M740 trailer, missile launcher, MGM-52 Lance
- M741 carrier, M163 VADS
- M742 armored recovery vehicle, (MBT-70)
- M743 armored vehicle-launched bridge, (MBT-70)
- M745 combat engineer vehicle, (MBT-70)
- M746 truck, tractor, heavy equipment transporter (HET), 22 1/2-ton, 8 × 8 (G903) – HETT
- M747 semi-trailer, low bed, heavy equipment transporter, 60-ton (G904) – HETT
- M748 truck, bolster (or logging), 5-ton, 6 × 6 (G744) – M39 series 5-ton 6×6 truck
- M749 semitrailer, shop van, 6-ton, (G819)
- M750 semitrailer, van, repair parts storage, 6-ton, 4-wheel (G819)
- M751A2 truck, bolster, 2 1/2-ton, 6 × 6
- M752 carrier, missile launcher, MGM-52 Lance
- M753 motor scooter, rough terrain
- M754 carrier, missile launcher, Hawk missile
- M755 carrier, 81-mm mortar: (M116 Husky)
- M756 truck, maintenance, 2 1/2-ton, 6 × 6, pipeline construction, with winch (G742) – M35 series 2½-ton 6×6 cargo truck
  - M756A2 truck, maintenance, 2 1/2-ton, 6 × 6, pipeline construction, with winch (multifuel) – M35 series 2½-ton 6×6 cargo truck
- M757 truck, tractor, 5-ton, 8 × 8, (G852)
- M759 carrier, cargo, 1 1/2-ton, f-t (G353)
- M761 truck, cargo, 2 1/2-ton, 6 × 6, U.S. Steel
- M762 trailer, chassis, 3/4-ton, 2-wheeled, (1970)
- M763 truck, maintenance, telephone (G742) – M35 series 2½-ton 6×6 cargo truck
- M764 truck, maintenance, 2 1/2-ton, 6 × 6, Earthboring Machine & Pole Sitter with Winch (G742) – M35 series 2½-ton 6×6 cargo truck
- M765 mechanized infantry combat vehicle, (FMC)
- M766 truck, chassis, 2 1/2-ton, 6 × 6 (G901)
- M767 truck, chassis, 2 1/2-ton, 6 × 6, (G901)
- M768 truck, chassis, 2 1/2-ton, 6 × 6, (G901)
- M769 truck, chassis, 2 1/2-ton, 6 × 6, (G901)
- M770 truck, cargo, 2 1/2-ton, 6 × 6, (G901)
- M771 truck, cargo, 2 1/2-ton, 6 × 6, (G901)
- M772 truck, cargo, 2 1/2-ton, 6 × 6, (G901)
- M773 truck, cargo, 2 1/2-ton, 6 × 6, (G901)
- M774 truck, cargo, 2 1/2-ton, 6 × 6, (G901)
- M775 truck, cargo, 2 1/2-ton, 6 × 6, (G901)
- M776 truck, tanker, 2 1/2-ton, 6 × 6, (G901)
- M777 truck, chassis, 2 1/2-ton, 6 × 6, (G901)
- M778 truck, cargo, dropside, 2 1/2-ton, 6 × 6, (G901)
- M779 truck, fuel tanker, 2 1/2-ton, 6 × 6, (G901)
- M780 truck, water tanker, 1000-Gal. 2 1/2-ton, 6 × 6, (G901)
- M781 truck, shop van, 2 1/2-ton, 6 × 6, (G901)
- M782 truck, instrument repair shop, 2 1/2-ton, 6 × 6, (G901)
- M783 truck, tractor, 2 1/2-ton, 6 × 6, (G901)
- M784 truck, dump, 2 1/2-ton, 6 × 6, (G901)
- M785 truck, bolster, 2 1/2-ton, 6 × 6, (G901)
- M786 truck, pole derrick, 2 1/2-ton, 6 × 6, (G901)
- M787 truck, telephone maintenance, 2 1/2-ton, 6 × 6, (G901)
- M788 truck, auger, 2 1/2-ton, 6 × 6, (G901)
- M789 trailer, flat bed tilt loading, 3/4-ton (G907)
- M790 trailer Erector Launcher Guided Missile, Pershing 1a
- M791 Truck, Expandable Van, 5-ton, 8 × 8 (G852)
- M792 truck, Ambulance, 1 1/4-ton, 4 × 4 (G874) – M561 Gama Goat
- M793 semitrailer, tank transporter, jointed, 52.5-ton, HETT
- M794 trailer, field laundry, 4-ton,
- M795 trailer, dough mixer, 4-ton,
- M796 trailer, bolster, 4-ton (G882)
- M798 trailer, Bolster

== M800 to M899 ==
- XM800 Armored Reconnaissance Scout Vehicle, (Lockheed-6 × 6.), (FMC-tracked)
- M802 trailer, electric shop, radar course direct central, Nike Hercules
- M803 tank combat, 152mm gun
- M805 Dolly set, (used by M802)
- M806 tank recovery vehicle, (M113 chassis)
- M807 tank recovery vehicle, (M113 chassis)
- M808 combat vehicle, articulated, Twister, Lockheed
- M809 truck, chassis: 5-ton, 6 × 6 LWB, AM General (G908) – M809 series 5-ton 6×6 truck
- M810 truck, chassis: 5-ton, 6 × 6 SWB (G908) – M809 series 5-ton 6×6 truck
- M811 truck, chassis: 5-ton, 6 × 6 XLWB (G908) – M809 series 5-ton 6×6 truck
- M812 truck, chassis: 5-ton, 6 × 6 XLWB (G908) – M809 series 5-ton 6×6 truck
- M813 truck, cargo: 5-ton, 6 x 6 LWB (G908) – M809 series 5-ton 6×6 truck
  - M813A1 truck, cargo dropside, 5-ton, 6 × 6 (G908) – M809 series 5-ton 6×6 truck
- M814 truck, cargo: 5-ton, 6 × 6, XLWB (G908) – M809 series 5-ton 6×6 truck
- M815 truck, bolster: 5-ton, 6 × 6 (G908) – M809 series 5-ton 6×6 truck
- M816 truck, wrecker: 5-ton, 6 × 6, Cummins 250 Engine (G908)
- M817 truck, dump: 5-ton, 6 × 6 (G908) – M809 series 5-ton 6×6 truck
- M818 truck, tractor: 5-ton, 6 × 6 (G908) – M809 series 5-ton 6×6 truck
- M819 truck, tractor: 5-ton, 6 × 6, wrecker (G908) – M809 series 5-ton 6×6 truck
- M820 truck, van: 5-ton, 6 × 6, expansible (G908) – M809 series 5-ton 6×6 truck
- M821 truck, Stake: Bridge Transporter, 5-ton, 6 × 6 (G908) – M809 series 5-ton 6×6 truck
- XM822 semitrailer, van: petroleum testing laboratory, 10-ton, 4-wheel
- XM823 semitrailer, van: teletype equipment, 10-ton, 4-wheel (G883)
- XM824 semitrailer, van: cryptographic equipment, 10-ton, 4-wheel (G883)
- M825 truck, recoilless rifle, 106 mm, 1/4-ton, 4 × 4, (1970)
- M829 dolly set (G889); includes M830 and M831
- M830 dolly set, front
- M831 dolly set, rear
- M832 dolly set, lift, transportable shelter: 5 1/4-Ton
- M840 dolly set, lift, transportable shelter: 4 1/2-Ton
- XM844 semitrailer, van: on-line electronic equipment, 10-ton, 4-wheel
- XM845 semitrailer, van: off-line electronic equipment, 10-ton, 4-wheel
- XM847 semitrailer, van: digital terminal No. 1 equipment, 10-ton, 4-wheel
- XM848 semitrailer, van: digital terminal No. 2 equipment, 10-ton, 4-wheel
- XM849 semitrailer, van: secure voice-electronic equipment, 10-ton, 4-wheel
- XM850 semitrailer, van: voice switch equipment, 10-ton, 4-wheel
- M857 semitrailer, tank, fuel, 5,000 gal, 4-wheel
- M860 semitrailer, flat bed, radar set, and M901 launcher MIM-104 Patriot
- M869 semitrailer, launcher, MIM-104 Patriot
- M870 semitrailer, low bed, 40-ton
- M871 semitrailer, tactical, dual-purpose breakbulk / container transporter, 22 1/2-ton
- M872 semitrailer, tactical, dual-purpose breakbulk / container transporter, 34 ton; extended M870
- M876 telephone truck, auger/derrick
- M877 'Goer', truck, cargo, 8-ton, 4 × 4, articulated, with crane
- M878 truck, tractor, 5-ton, 4 × 2, tard type
- M880/M890 pickups (1976, early CUCV)
  - M880 – Standard 4×4 pickup
  - M881 – M880 fitted with additional 100-amp 24-volt generator
  - M882 – M881 fitted with additional 60-amp 24-volt generator and communications equipment
  - M883 – M881 fitted with slide-in shelter kit
  - M884 – M880 fitted with 100-amp 24-volt generator and slide-in shelter kit with tie-downs
  - M885 – M880 fitted with slide-in shelter kit with tie-downs
  - M886 – M880 ambulance model
  - M887 – M880 maintenance model
  - M888 – M880 telephone maintenance model
  - M890 – Standard 4 × 2 pickup
  - M891 – M890 fitted with additional 60-amp 24-volt generator
  - M892 – M890 fitted with additional 60-amp 24-volt generator and communications kit
  - M893 – M890 ambulance version

== M900 to M999 ==
- M901 ITV vehicle, improved TOW, full track
- M911 truck, tractor, commercial, heavy equipment transporter (C-HET), 22 1/2-ton, 8 x 6 – HETT
- XM912 semitrailer, van: computer equipment, 10-ton, 4-wheel
- XM913 semitrailer, van: computer equipment, 10-ton, 4-wheel
- M915 truck, tractor, line haul, 14-ton, 6 × 4 – M915 (truck)
- M916 truck, tractor, light equipment transporter (LET), 6 × 6 w/winch – M915 (truck)
- M917 truck chassis, 8 × 6 (for 20-ton dump truck) – M915 (truck)
- M918 truck chassis, 6 × 6 (for 1500 gal bituminous distributor) – M915 (truck)
- M919 truck chassis, 8 × 6 (for concrete mobile mixer) – M915 (truck)
- M920 truck, tractor, medium equipment transporter (MET), 20-ton, 8 × 6 w/winch – M915 (truck)
- M923 truck, cargo: 5-ton, 6 × 6 dropside - M939 series 5-ton 6×6 truck
- M924 truck, cargo: LWB, 5-ton, 6 × 6 (w/o winch) - M939 series 5-ton 6×6 truck
- M925 truck, cargo: 5-ton, 6 × 6 dropside (w/winch) - M939 series 5-ton 6×6 truck
- M926 truck, cargo, longbed, 5-ton, 6 × 6 - M939 series 5-ton 6×6 truck
- M927 truck, cargo: 5-ton, 6 × 6 XLWB- M939 series 5-ton 6×6 truck
- M928 truck, cargo: 5-ton, 6 × 6 XLWB (w/winch) - M939 series 5-ton 6×6 truck
- M929 truck, dump: 5-ton, 6 × 6 - M939 series 5-ton 6×6 truck
- M930 truck, dump: 5-ton, 6 × 6 (w/winch) - M939 series 5-ton 6×6 truck
- M931 truck, tractor: 5-ton, 6 × 6 - M939 series 5-ton 6×6 truck
- M932 truck, tractor: 5-ton, 6 × 6 (w/winch) - M939 series 5-ton 6×6 truck
- M933 truck, tractor: 5-ton, 6 × 6 (w/winch) - M939 series 5-ton 6×6 truck
- M934 truck, van, expansible: 5-ton, 6 × 6 XLWB - M939 series 5-ton 6×6 truck
- M935 truck, van, expansible: 5-ton, 6 × 6 XLWB, w/hydraulic lift gate - M939 series 5-ton 6×6 truck
- M936 truck, medium wrecker: 5-ton, 6 × 6 (w/winch) - M939 series 5-ton 6×6 truck
- M939 truck, chassis: 5-ton, 6 × 6 (w/winch)
- M940 truck, chassis: 5-ton, 6 × 6 (w/winch) - M939 series 5-ton 6×6 truck
- M941 truck, chassis: 5-ton, 6 × 6 - M939 series 5-ton 6×6 truck
- M942 truck, chassis: 5-ton, 6 × 6 (XLWB) - M939 series 5-ton 6×6 truck
- M943 truck, chassis: 5-ton, 6 × 6 (XLWB W/winch) - M939 series 5-ton 6×6 truck
- M944 truck, chassis: 5-ton, 6 × 6 - M939 series 5-ton 6×6 truck
  - M944A1 truck, chassis, 5-ton, 6 × 6 mobile shop equipped
- M945 truck, chassis: 5-ton, 6 × 6 - M939 series 5-ton 6×6 truck
- M963 truck, cargo, 2 1/2-ton, 6 × 6,
- M966A1 truck, missile carrier, TOW, armor, 1 1/4-ton, 4 × 4, w/o winch (HMMWV)
- M967 semitrailer, tank, bulk haul, 5000 gal., self load/unload
- M969 semitrailer, tank, fuel dispensing, 5000 gal. automotive
- M970 semitrailer, tank, fuel dispensing, 5000 gal. under/over wing aircraft
- XM971 semitrailer, van: satellite terminal, 10-ton, 4-wheel
- M972 semitrailer, tanker, water, 5,000-gal.
- M973 carrier, cargo, f-t, (SUSV)
- M974 semitrailer, low bed, 12-ton, MIM-104 Patriot
- M975 carrier, launcher, f-t,
- M976 semitrailer, missile transport, MIM-104 Patriot
- M977 truck, cargo: 10-ton, 8 × 8, with materiel handling crane – HEMTT
- M978 truck, tank: 10-ton, 8 × 8, fuel servicing, 2500 gallon – HEMTT
- M981 FISTV carrier, infantry, armored, full-track, (M113 chassis)
- M983 truck, tractor: 10-ton, 8 × 8 – HEMTT
- M984 truck, wrecker: 10-ton, recovery, 8 × 8 – HEMTT
  - M984A1 HEMTT truck, wrecker, 10-ton, 8 × 8, recovery
  - M984E1 HEMTT truck, wrecker, 10-ton, 8 × 8, recovery
- M985 truck, cargo: 10-ton, 8 × 8, with HD materiel handling crane – HEMTT
  - M985W1 HEMTT truck, cargo, 10-ton, 8 × 8, with HD materiel handling crane
- M986 semitrailer, transporter, erector/launcher, ground-launched cruise missile
- M987 fighting vehicle system carrier
- M988 chassis, self-propelled, (M48A5), M247 Sergeant York
- M989 heavy expanded mobility ammunition trailer (HEMAT), 11-ton
- M990 semitrailer, van, 6-ton,
- XM991 semitrailer, van: repair facility, 10 ton, 2 axle, 4 wheel
- M992 carrier, ammunition, (FAASV), (M109A2 chassis)
- M993 M270 multiple launch rocket system
- XM995 semitrailer, van: test station, 10 ton, 2 axle, 4 wheel
- M996 truck, ambulance, 4 × 4, armored, 2-litter,(HMMWV)
- M997 truck, ambulance, 4-litter, armor, 1 1/4-ton, 4 × 4 (HMMWV)
  - M997A1 truck, ambulance, 4-litter, armor, 1 1/4-ton, 4 × 4 (HMMWV)
- M998 truck, cargo, personnel, 1 1/4-ton, 4 × 4, w/o winch (HMMWV)
  - M998A1 truck, cargo, personnel, 1 1/4-ton, 4 × 4, w/o winch (HMMWV)

== M1000 to M1099 ==
- M1000 semitrailer, low bed, 70-ton, rear loading – HETT
- M1001 truck, tractor, 10-ton, 8 × 8, MAN (w/crane)
- M1002 truck, wrecker, 10-ton, 8 × 8, MAN w/crane
- M1005 semitrailer, electronic, 6-ton, 1-axle Roland missile
- M1006 semitrailer, van, electronic NBC, 6 Ton
- M1007 semitrailer, van, electronic, 6-ton Pershing II
- M1008 truck, cargo, 1 1/4-ton, 4 × 4, NSN 2320-01-123-6827 (CUCV)
  - M1008A1 truck, cargo, communications kit, 100amp/24v, 1 1/4-ton, 4 × 4 (CUCV)
- M1009 truck, utility, 3/4-ton, 4 × 4, NSN 2320-01-123-2665 (CUCV)
- M1010 truck, ambulance, 1 1/4-ton, 4 × 4, NSN 2320-01-123-2666 (CUCV)
- M1013 truck, tractor, 10-ton, 8 × 8, MAN (w/crane)
- M1014 truck, tractor, 10-ton, 8 × 8, MAN (w/o crane), NSN 2320-12-191-5425
- M1015 carrier, cargo, f-t, ballistic protected shelter
- M1022 dolly set, lift, transportable shelter: 7 1/2-Ton
- M1025A1 truck, armament carrier, armor, 1 1/4-ton, 4 × 4, w/o winch (HMMWV)
- M1026A1 truck, armament carrier, armor, 1 1/4-ton, 4 × 4, w/winch (HMMWV)
- M1028 truck, shelter carrier, 1 1/4-ton, 4 × 4, NSN 2320-01-123-5077 (CUCV)
  - M1028A1 truck, shelter carrier, 1 1/4-ton, 4 × 4, PTO capability
  - M1028A2 truck, shelter carrier, 1 1/2-ton, 4 × 4, PTO, dual rear wheels
  - M1028A3 truck, shelter carrier, 1 1/4-ton, 4 × 4, dual rear wheels
  - M1028FF truck, firefighting, 1 1/4-ton, 4 × 4, dual rear wheels
- M1030M1 Motorcycle
- M1031 truck, chassis, 1 1/4-ton, 4 × 4, PTO capability (contact truck) (CUCV)
- M1032 semitrailer van guided missile repair parts: (PATRIOT)
- M1034 trailer, flatbed, 5-ton
- M1035A1 truck, ambulance, 2-litter, soft-top, 1 1/4-ton, 4 × 4 (HMMWV)
- M1036 truck, truck, missile carrier, TOW, supplemental armor, 4 × 4, w/winch (HMMWV)
- M1037 truck, shelter carrier, 4 × 4, (S-250 shelter)
- M1038A1 truck, cargo, personnel, 1 1/4-ton, 4 × 4, w/o winch (HMMWV)
- M1040 Fast Attack Vehicle, 4 × 2
- M1041 Fast Attack Vehicle, 4 × 2, w/TOW
- M1042 truck, shelter carrier, 4 × 4, w/winch, (S-250 shelter)
- M1043A1 truck, armament carrier, supplemental armor, 4 × 4, w/o winch (HMMWV)
- M1044A1 truck, armament carrier, supplemental armor, 4 × 4, w/winch (HMMWV)
- M1045A1 truck, missile carrier, TOW, supplemental armor, 4 × 4, w/o winch (HMMWV)
- M1046A1 truck, missile carrier, TOW, supplemental armor, 4 × 4, w/winch (HMMWV)
- M1047 armored car, 8 × 8, LAV-25
- M1048 trailer, flatbed, 6-ton
- M1050 carrier, ammunition, FAASV
- M1059 carrier, smoke generator, (M113 chassis)
- M1060 remote engineer vehicle, ROBAT (modified M60 tank)
- M1061 trailer, flatbed, 5 ton, 4 × 4, XM1061A1
- M1062 semitrailer, tank: fuel, 7500 gal., 2-axle
- XM1063 semitrailer, Van: Electronic Tactical, 12-ton, 4-wheel
- M1064 mortar carrier, equipped with M121 120 mm mortar
- M1065 carrier, command post, f-t, 1.5-ton (M973 series)
- M1066 carrier, ambulance, f-t, 1.5-ton (M973 series)
- M1067 carrier, cargo, f-t, 1.5-ton (M973 series)
- M1069 truck, tractor, prime mover, light artillery,(M119 105mm)
- M1070 tractor, 8 × 8, HETT
- M1073 trailer, flat bed, general purpose, 7.5-ton
- M1074 truck, palletized loading, 10 × 10 with material handling crane and 20K winch – Palletized Load System
- M1075 truck, palletized loading, 10 x 10 w/o material handling crane – Palletized Load System
- M1076 palletized load system trailer (PLST) – Palletized Load System
- M1077 truck, flatrack, Palletized Load System, (PLST)
- M1078 2.5-ton cargo truck, (LMTV)
- M1079 2.5-ton van
- M1080 2.5-ton chassis
- M1081 2.5-ton cargo truck LVAD LAPES/AD
- M1082 2.5-ton trailer
- M1083 5-ton cargo truck
- M1084 5-ton cargo truck with MHE
- M1085 5-ton long-wheelbase cargo truck
- M1086 5-ton long-wheelbase cargo truck with MHE
- M1087 5-ton expansible van
- M1088 5-ton tractor
- M1089 5-ton wrecker
- M1090 5-ton dump truck
- M1091 5-ton fuel truck
- M1092 truck, chassis 5-ton
- M1093 5-ton cargo truck LVAD LAPES/AD
- M1094 5-ton dump truck LVAD LAPES/AD
- M1095 5-ton trailer
- M1096 5-ton long-wheelbase chassis
- M1097A1 truck, HMMWV, variant, heavy, 1 1/4-ton, 4 × 4
- M1097A2 truck, HMMWV, maintenance, heavy, 1 1/4-ton, 4 × 4
- M1097 Avenger, short-range air defense system
- M1098 5000 gallon semitrailer

== M1100 to M1199 ==
- M1100 trailer, for M120 120 mm mortar
- M1101 trailer, cargo, light, (for HMMWV)
- M1102 trailer, cargo, heavy, (for HMMWV)
- M1103 trailer, chassis, (for HMMWV)
- M1108 universal carrier, armored carrier based on the M113
- M1109 HMMWV 4 × 4 weapon carrier
- M1112 trailer, tank, water: 400 gallon, 1 1/2-ton, 8-wheel (Water Buffalo)
- M1113 HMMWV 4 × 4 utility vehicle
- M1114 HMMWV 4 × 4 weapon carrier with improved armour protection
- M1115 HMMWV 4 × 4 self-propelled TOW missile launcher
- M1116 4 × 4 armored security vehicle
- M1117 armored security vehicle, Guardian, 4 × 4 armored security vehicle based on the V-100 Commando,
- M1120 HEMTT Load Handling System (LHS)
- M1121 HMMWV 4 × 4 self-propelled TOW missile launcher
- M1123 HMMWV 4 × 4 utility vehicle,
- M1124
- M1125
- M1126 ICV version of the Stryker
- M1127 RV version of the Stryker
- M1128 MGS version of the Stryker
- M1129 MC version of the Stryker
- M1130 CV version of the Stryker
- M1131 FSV version of the Stryker
- M1132 ESV version of the Stryker
- M1133 MEV version of the Stryker
- M1134 ATGM version of the Stryker
- M1135 NBCRV version of the Stryker
- M1136
- M1137
- M1138
- M1139
- M1140 FMTV 5-ton truck version for the HIMARS launcher system
- M1141
- M1142 HEMTT Tactical Fire Fighting Truck based on the (M1120)
- M1143
- M1144
- M1145 HMMWV version for USAF FAC duties
- M1146
- M1147 FMTV load handling system trailer
- XM1148 FMTV 8.8-ton load handling system truck
- M1149
- M1150 Assault breacher vehicle based on the M1 Abrams
- M1151 Up-Armored Capable HMMWV Enhanced Armament Carrier
- M1152 Up-Armored Capable HMMWV Enhanced Troop/Cargo/Shelter Carrier
- M1153
- M1154
- M1155
- M1156
- M1157 FMTV 10-ton dump truck
- M1158 HEMTT water tender version of the (M1120)
- M1159
- M1160 FMTV 10-ton truck variant for MEADS system
- M1161 Growler (vehicle) light support vehicle,
- M1162 Growler (vehicle) trailer, canceled
- M1163 Growler (vehicle) light support vehicle, Prime mover,
- M1164 ammunition trailer
- M1165 Up-Armored HMMWV
- M1166
- M1167 TOW HMMWV
- M1168
- M1169
- M1170
- M1171
- M1172
- M1173
- M1174
- M1175
- M1176
- M1177
- M1178
- M1179
- M1180
- M1181
- M1182
- M1183
- M1184
- M1185
- M1186
- M1187
- M1188
- M1189
- M1190
- M1191
- M1192
- M1193
- M1194
- M1195
- M1196
- M1197 HMMWV Field Litter Ambulance (Air Force)
- M1198
- M1199

== M1200 to M1299 ==
- M1200 Armored Knight
- M1201 FCSMGV RSV
- M1202 FCSMGV MCS
- M1203 FCSMGV NLOS-C
- M1204 FCSMGV NLOS-M
- M1205 FCSMGV RMV
- M1206 FCSMGV ICV
- M1207 FCSMGV ME-V
- M1208 FCSMGV ME-T
- M1209 FCSMGV C2V
- M1210
- M1211 ECV 2 command and control
- M1212 ECV 2 armament carrier
- M1213 ECV 2 shelter/troop carrier
- M1214 ECV 2 TOW weapons carrier
- M1215
- M1216 small unmanned ground vehicle
- M1217 multifunctional utility/logistics and equipment
- M1218 multifunctional utility/logistics and equipment
- M1219 armed robotic vehicle
- M1220 Caiman 6X6 MRAP MRPV
- M1221 RG-33L USMC 6X6 MRAP
- M1222
- M1223
- M1224 MaxxPro
- M1225 ECV 2 ambulance
- M1226 RG-33L 6x6 MMPV Panther mine resistant vehicle engineer
- M1227 RG-33L 6X6 MMPV Panther mine resistant vehicle EOD
- M1228
- M1229 RG-33L 6X6 MMPV Prophet Signals Intelligence vehicle
- M1230 Caiman TVS
- M1231 Husky VMMD
- M1232 RG-33L 6X6 MRAP
- M1233 RG-33L 6X6 Ambulance MRAP
- M1234 MaxxPro Plus MRAP
- M1235 MaxxPro Dash/Dash DXM MRAP
- M1236 RG-31A3 (EM) MRAP
- M1237 RG-33L Plus MRAP 6X6
- M1238 RG-33 SOCOM MRAP 4X4
- M1239 RG-33L SOCOM AUV 6X6
- M1240 M-ATV
- M1241 RG-31 Mk5E MRAP
- M1242
- M1243
- M1244
- M1245 SOCOM M-ATV SOCOM version of the M1240
- M1246
- M1247
- M1248 6X6 MTV Caiman
- M1249 Maxxpro 6X6 MaxxPro 6X6 recovery vehicle
- M1250 Tilt Deck Recovery trailer (TDRT)
- M1251 FSVV
- M1252 MCVV
- M1253 ATVV
- M1254 MEVV
- M1255 CVV
- M1256 ICVV
- M1257 ESVV
- M1258
- M1259
- M1260
- M1261
- M1262
- M1263
- M1264
- M1265 M-SHORAD
- M1266 MaxxPro Long Wheel Base (LWB) Ambulance
- M1267
- M1268 Light Engineer Utility trailer (LEUT) Type I
- M1269 LEUT Type II
- M1270 RG-31 Mk5E Medium Mine Protected Vehicle (MMPV) Type II
- M1271 Hydrema 910 mine clearing vehicle
- M1272 Buffalo A2
- M1273 FMTV 10-ton chassis
- M1274 M-ATV Key Leader Vehicles (KLV), WIN-T Soldier Network Extension (SNE)
- M1275
- M1276 M-ATV Key Leader Vehicles (KLV), WIN-T Point of Presence (PoP)
- M1277 M-ATV fitted with M153 CROWS
- M1278 Joint Light Tactical Vehicle (JLTV) Heavy Guns Carrier (HGC)
- M1279 Joint Light Tactical Vehicle (JLTV) Utility (Utl)
- M1280 Joint Light Tactical Vehicle (JLTV) General Purpose (GP)
- M1281 Joint Light Tactical Vehicle (JLTV) Close Combat Weapons Carrier (CCWC)
- M1282
- M1283 General Purpose (GP)
- M1284 Medical Evacuation Vehicle (MEV)
- M1285 Medical Treatment Vehicle (MTV)
- M1286 Mission Command (MCmd)
- M1287 Mortar Carrier Vehicle (MCV)
- M1288 Ground Mobility Vehicle (GMV 1.1)
- M1289 Joint Light Tactical Vehicle (JLTV) trailer
- M1290
- M1291
- M1292
- M1293
- M1294
- M1295
- M1296 Dragoon (ICVD)
- M1297 Army Ground Mobility Vehicle (AGMV 1.1)
- M1298
- M1299 Extended Range Cannon Artillery

== M1300 to M1399 ==
- M1300 tractor, 8 × 8, EHETS
- M1301 Infantry Squad Vehicle (ISV)
- M1302 semi-trailer, tank transporter EHETS 8-axles, 85-ton
- M1304 ICVD A1

== Non-consecutive numbers ==
- M1 Abrams tank, main battle, full-track, 105 mm gun, 58-ton
  - M1A1 Abrams tank, main battle, full-track, 120 mm gun, 58-ton
  - M1A2 Abrams tank, main battle, full-track, 120 mm gun w/2nd gun sight for TC
- M2 Bradley Vehicle, Infantry Fighting, full-track, armored, 25 mm chain-gun, 21 1/2-ton
  - M2A1 Vehicle, Infantry Fighting, full-track, armored, 25 mm chain-gun, 21 1/2-ton
  - M2A2 Vehicle, Infantry Fighting, full-track, armored, 25 mm chain-gun, 21 1/2-ton
- M3 Bradley Vehicle, Cavalry Fighting, full-track, armored, 25 mm chain-gun, 21 1/2-ton
  - M3A1 Vehicle, Cavalry Fighting, full-track, armored, 25 mm chain-gun, 21 1/2-ton
  - M3A2 Vehicle, Cavalry Fighting, full-track, armored, 25 mm chain-gun, 21 1/2-ton
- M3 CROP Palletized Load System
- M4 C2V battlefield command post
- M5 ground-based common sensor carrier
- M6 Linebacker anti-aircraft vehicle
- M7 Bradley fire support vehicle
- M8 armored gun system
- M9 ACE – armored combat earthmover
- M10 Booker
- M93 Fox, armored reconnaissance vehicle, 6 × 6
- M104 Wolverine (AVLB)
- M1975 Launcher, Heavy Dry Support Bridge
- M1977 HEMTT Common Bridge Transporter (CBT) – HEMTT
- XM2001 Crusader, self-propelled howitzer

== See also ==
- List of armored fighting vehicles
- List of land vehicles of the U.S. Armed Forces
- List of military vehicles
- List of U.S. military vehicles by supply catalog designation
- List of U.S. Signal Corps vehicles
- List of individual weapons of the U.S. Armed Forces
- Military technology and equipment
- United States Army Tank Automotive Research, Development and Engineering Center
- NATO Stock Number
