= M7 snow tractor =

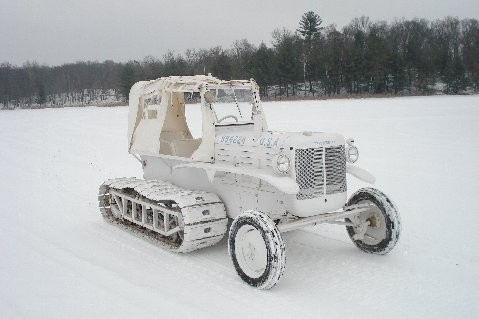

Overview
- Manufacturer: Allis-Chalmers
- Production: 291

Body and chassis
- Body style: open cab 2-seat
- Layout: Halftrack

Powertrain
- Engine: Gasoline, (Willys MB)
- Transmission: 3 speed, high and low range

Dimensions
- Length: 11 ft 4 in (3.45 m)
- Width: 5 ft 3 in (1.60 m)
- Height: 5 ft 4 in (1.63 m)
- Curb weight: 3,049 lb (1,383 kg)

The Allis-Chalmers M7 snow tractor was designed for use by the U.S. Army Air Corps as a rescue vehicle in remote northern bases.

== History ==
The M7 (T26E4) snow tractor was standardized in August 1943, and was downgraded to Limited standard in November 1944. It was intended to pull a one-ton M19 snow trailer (T48). The tractor used many Allis Chalmers farm tractor components. It also used many Willys MB jeep powertrain components to lessen the military's spare parts inventory requirements.

The distinguishing feature of the M7 was the track system (halftrack). The M7's track ran on two rubber belts with four steel cables inside. The machine had a tendency to have the tracks come off in use. Another feature of both the tractor and trailer is that the tires could be switched with skis.

Prototyping of the machine that eventually became the M7 included several machines by Emmett Tucker (of subsequent Tucker Sno-Cat fame). At least one of the prototypes, a T26E3, still exists.

Something over ten percent of production, over 30 units, still survive. The track system and track plate width (18") look to have been borrowed from the early versions of the Weasel, although the M7 tracks are shorter with fewer plates.

== M19 snow trailer ==
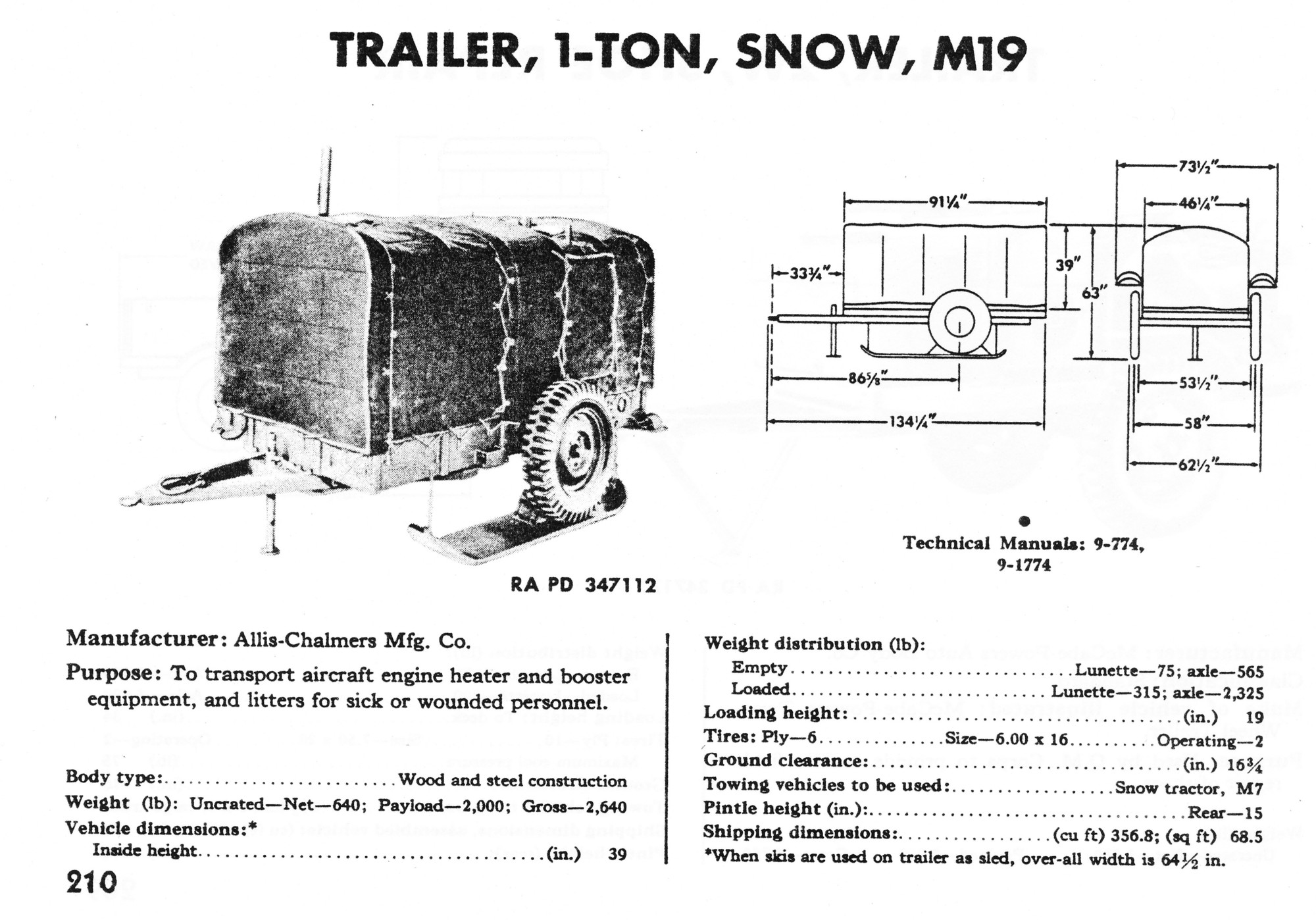
M19 1-ton snow trailer

Saginaw Products made the M19 ski-wheel trailers. Two production batches are known, one in 1944 and one in 1950.

The M19 trailer had a net weight of 640 lbs, and a payload of 2,000 lbs. It had a wooden body on a steel hollow-section frame, with hood, hoops, side and end panels all easily detachable, and it was normally equipped with a heater and two stretchers, plus a rear pintle hitch so that trailers could be doubled up. The two-bolt mounting pintle hitch was unique to the M7 and M19, and would not accommodate even an ordinary MB / GPW jeep trailer lunette.

They had three main functions;

Rescue and recovery, for which they were equipped with two stretchers and a personnel heater

Aircraft starting, for which they were outfitted with much larger aircraft engine heaters and slave power equipment

Cargo, for which they could be operated with or without canvas hood, top bows, side and end frames

Serial numbers for the 1950 units seem to start at 1,000 and were dated around November of that year, suggesting they were made to supplement a batch of 1944 originals that were going to Norway, and seem to top out around 1,150.

It is quite likely that the 1944 batch did not run to as much as 1,000 units, as 600 would have supplied two trailers for every M7 that Allis Chalmers built. Estimated total production would be around 750 ( 600 in 1944 and 150 in 1950 ) but many 1950 trailers seem to have survived due to careful use by the Norwegian Army.

The 1944 originals had several noted weak points which can all be attributed to the lightness of construction ( they were rated at 2,000 lbs, same as a Ben Hur trailer, but weighed only one third as much - 640 lbs )

The 1944 tow bar frames had holes for bolting through the drag chains - 1950 trailers had no holes and drag chain ends welded to the tow frame.

The 1944 skis were mostly wood / ply with metal brackets and strake - 1950 trailers had metal sheath underneath, with strake welded to it.

The 1944 front support legs were quite short - 1950 support legs were lengthened by a couple of inches.

The 1944 units came with ordinary MB / GPW split combat rims, 1950 units came with 15" solid rims, which were interchangeable and might have been from M series jeeps. (clarification needed)

In addition to those points they tried to recover as much weight as they could by lightening. The 1944 heavy rectangular bracket for mounting the heater was replaced by a much lighter flimsy unit on the 1950 production. The type of plug and socket for the lights and auxiliary power also looks to have been updated.

Despite this rework all M19s are very prone to damage. The trailer body will bend noticeably when loaded away from the axle line and normally stays out of flat. The tow frame is a fabrication work of art, being split, angled, and welded, but this results in a lot of work and since they appear not to have been coated internally when new, most are now quite weak as a result of internal rusting.

The canvas covers were insulated by quilting, and had one green side and one white side, plus flaps and reinforcement for the various heater and ventilation exhaust outputs - many of which were doubled to allow the covers to be reversible.

The low tow hitch position and small tow ring means they were really only suitable for towing behind an M7, as they dragged at quite an angle when hitched to a Weasel. An M7 tractor could tow two loaded M19 trailers on solid going such as an ice or snow-covered road, and when rougher ground was to be traversed it would drop one unit and shuttle them across the rougher ground one at a time.

== See also ==
- G-numbers (G194), trailer is G195
- M-numbers
- M29 Weasel
