= M520 Goer =

US Army heavy tactical truck, in service 1972-1982

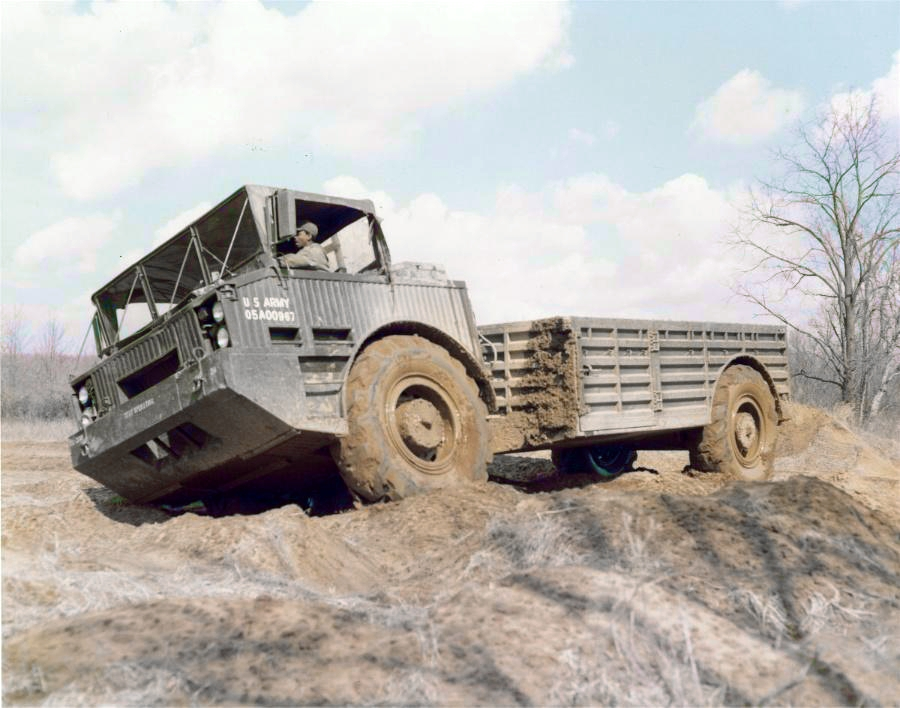

Overview
- Manufacturer: Caterpillar
- Also called: M553 / M559 / M877
- Production: 1972–1976, 1,300 units
- Assembly: Marinette Marine

Body and chassis
- Body style: drop-side truck
- Layout: engine behind driver; four-wheel drive
- Platform: Caterpillar earth-movers

Powertrain
- Engine: 8,603cc 6-cyl Diesel (192 hp)
- Transmission: six-speed

Dimensions
- Wheelbase: 235 inch / 5,97m
- Length: 380 inch / 9,65m
- Width: 108 inch / 2,74m
- Height: 96 inch / 2,44m (windshield down)
- Curb weight: 27,000 lbs / 12.000 kg

Chronology
- Successor: Oshkosh HEMTT truck system

The M520 "Truck, Cargo, 8-ton, 4x4", nicknamed Goer, truck series was formerly the US Army’s standard heavy tactical truck before its replacement by the Oshkosh HEMTT. As trucks go, the Caterpillar-made Goer stands out due to being articulated, much wider than other trucks, and lacking suspension on the wheels.

Some 1,300 of these trucks were built from 1972 to 1976. The majority were M520 Cargo Trucks. The tankers were designated M559 Fuel Servicing Tanker Truck, and the wreckers M553 Wrecker Truck. When fitted with its own crane, the cargo variant was designated M877 Cargo Truck with Material Handling Crane.

== Overview ==
In the mid-1950s, the US military were looking for a new, extreme off-road, tactical truck series, with substantially increased load-carrying capacity. According to a May 2006 article in Classic Military Vehicle magazine, the United States Armor Board began evaluating and testing commercially available, large, wheeled, articulated-steering, earth-moving equipment for potential tactical application in 1956 / 1957. This resulted in development contracts for 4x4 all-terrain vehicles of various weight classes being awarded to Clark Equipment, Le Tourneau-Westinghouse, and Caterpillar Tractor Company.

Clark provided a 5-short-ton (4.5 t) prototype, based on their Model 75 log-skidder, powered by a Cummins 6-cyl. diesel engine. Caterpillar's entries were in the eight-ton class and were designated: XM520 (8-ton cargo truck), XM553 (10-short-ton (9.1 t) wrecker recovering), and XM559 (8-short-ton (7.3 t), 2,500-US-gallon (9,500 L; 2,100 imp gal) tanker). Le Tourneau-Westinghouse offered three variants in the 15-short-ton (14 t) class: XM437 Cargo, XM438 Tanker, and XM554 Wrecker.

Without exception, the prototypes consisted of two segments: housing engine and driver's compartment in the front and using the rear part as main transport unit, whereby steering was accomplished by articulating the whole front unit relative to the rear, as opposed to pivot steering the front wheels conventionally. The large wheels with large, low-pressure tires were mounted without any suspension or steering mechanism, greatly simplifying the design. In order to keep the wheels on the ground on uneven terrain, the front and rear units could not only swivel around a vertical axis, but also along the vehicle's longitudinal axis, allowing significant articulation. In low gear ranges, the Goer had four-wheel drive capability, but on-road it was purely front-wheel drive.

The Caterpillar design did well in testing, and in 1960, the company was awarded a multimillion-dollar contract for developing eight 8-short-ton (7.3 t) cargo trucks, delivered in 1961 and 1962, as well as two 10-short-ton (9.1 t) wreckers and two 2,500-US-gallon (9,500 L; 2,100 imp gal) tankers in 1962. Another twenty-three units were ordered in 1963, then field-tested in West Germany in 1964 and in South Vietnam in 1966.

== Production of official variants ==
Not until 1971 did Caterpillar eventually receive a production contract for 1300 units: 812 M520 cargo-vehicles, 371 M559 tankers and 117 M553 wreckers. Production began in 1972 and lasted through June 1976. When fitted with its own crane, the cargo variant would be designated M877. All variants except the wrecker existed both with or without front winch, whereas all wreckers had winches both front and rear. Early units, with a Cat D333 engine, were multi-fuel, but later ones, with the D333C powerplant, were diesel only.

The M520 in water, showing both its articulation and buoyancy.

== Field performance ==
Not only did the Caterpillar offer extreme off-road ability, including 20° longitudinal articulation and 30° side-slopes, it was also fully amphibious, using the wheels for propulsion in the water. The rear cargo-bed tailgate and drop-side doors, that allowed rapid discharge of cargo, had watertight seals to preserve the unit's swimming capability. In the US's involvement in the Vietnam War, the Goer developed a reputation of being able to go where other trucks could not, and it was one of the preferred resupply vehicles after the pre-production units' introduction in 1966. They achieved a 90% availability rate, even though spare parts for the Goer were not an official part of the US Army inventory until 1972.

Nevertheless, the vehicle's lack of suspension made it too bouncy on hardened surfaces, making most drivers shy away from its 31 mph (50 km/h) top speed. The method for keeping bounce to a minimum on hard roads was to gently sway the vehicle left and right at top speed. The bilge pumps were often abused on hard road convoys as "super-squirters" by bored drivers as they would accumulate water in the hull, and drivers soon realized havoc could be raised by turning on the high volume pumps to douse passing and oncoming traffic. The oscillating cab was also dangerous as entering or exiting the vehicle with the engine off could put pressure on the steering wheel and when the engine was started the cab would turn without warning. Also, its oversize dimensions proved generally awkward, so in the 1980s it was replaced by the Oshkosh Heavy Expanded Mobility Tactical Truck series, that combined good on-road behavior with adequate off-road performance. As the Goers were surplused accordingly, it was done so under a demilitarization order similar to that of the M151 jeep. Core components in the steering and driveline were destroyed before the remains of the vehicle were sold off. Consequently, only very few vehicles remained in existence, in museums and private collections.

== See also ==
- G-numbers
- M-numbers
- Heavy Expanded Mobility Tactical Truck (replacement in U.S. Army service)

== Reference codes ==
- SNL G861 – Supply catalog standard nomenclature number (until late 1950s)
- FSN / NSN 2320 — various Federal Stock Numbers / National Stock Numbers, per variant, in the 1960s and 1970s
- TM 9-2320-233 technical manuals, dated 1972-1979
