= M1151 =

Light military vehicle

M1151 Enhanced Armament Carrier
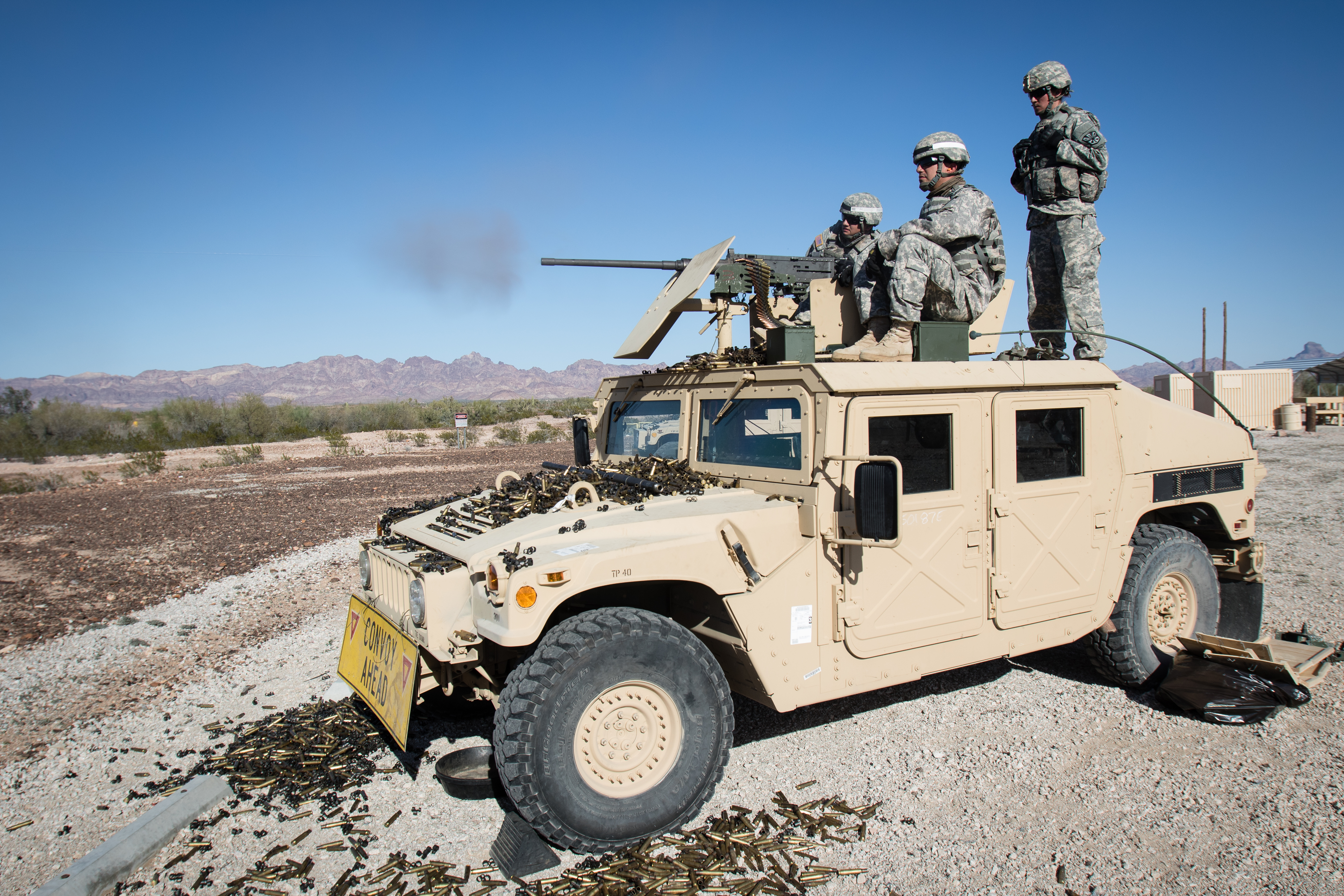
- M2 with gun shield mounted on top of the M1151's turret being fired by one of the Arizona Army National Guard troops at Yuma Proving Ground.
- Place of origin: United States

Service history
- Used by: United States

Production history
- Manufacturer: AM General

Specifications
- Mass: M1151: 7,500 lb (3,400 kg); M1151A1: 8,150 lb (3,700 kg); M1151A1 uparmored w/ B1 Kit: 10,300 lb (4,700 kg)
- Width: 7 ft 7 in (2.31 m)
- Engine: General Engine Products (GEP) V8, 6.5L Turbocharged Diesel; 190 hp (140 kW)
- Payload capacity: M1151: 4,000 lb (1,800 kg); M1151A1: 3,950 lb (1,790 kg); M1151A1 w/ B1 Armor Package: 1,800 lb (820 kg)
- Transmission: General Transmission Products (GTP) 4-Speed Automatic
- Suspension: Independent 4×4
- Ground clearance: 17.2 in (44 cm)
- Fuel capacity: 25 US gal (95 L)
- Operational range: 250 mi (220 nmi) Fuel consumption: 4 (offroad) miles per gallon - 8 (road) miles per gallon 1 gallon per hour on idle
- Maximum speed: 70 mph (61 kn)

The M1151 Enhanced Armament Carrier is an improved version of the standard Humvee (HMMWV) designed to replace the M1025A2 used by the United States Armed Forces as a response to United States Central Command requirements.

== History ==
AM General of South Bend, Ind., was awarded a $59,963,442 contract for 814 M1152s and 31 M1151s and a $19,617,847 contract to buy and install armor kits for the M1151.

== Design ==
The M1151 HMMWV has a heavier chassis and improved engine to handle add-on armor. It is built on an Expanded Capacity Vehicle chassis, which allows for more passengers or additional supplies (up to 2,300 lbs).

Its two- or four-seat variant is the M1152 Enhanced Troop/Cargo/Shelter Carrier, designed to replace the M1097A2 Heavy HMMWV and M1113 Expanded Capacity Vehicle.

== Variants ==
- M1151: Base model.
- M1151A1: M1151 with Integrated Armor Package installed at factory. Comes with "A-kit" by default; can add "B-kit" for increased protection. Also previously referred to as M1151P1.

== See also ==
- List of U.S. military vehicles by model number
