= Jeep trailer =

US Army cargo trailer

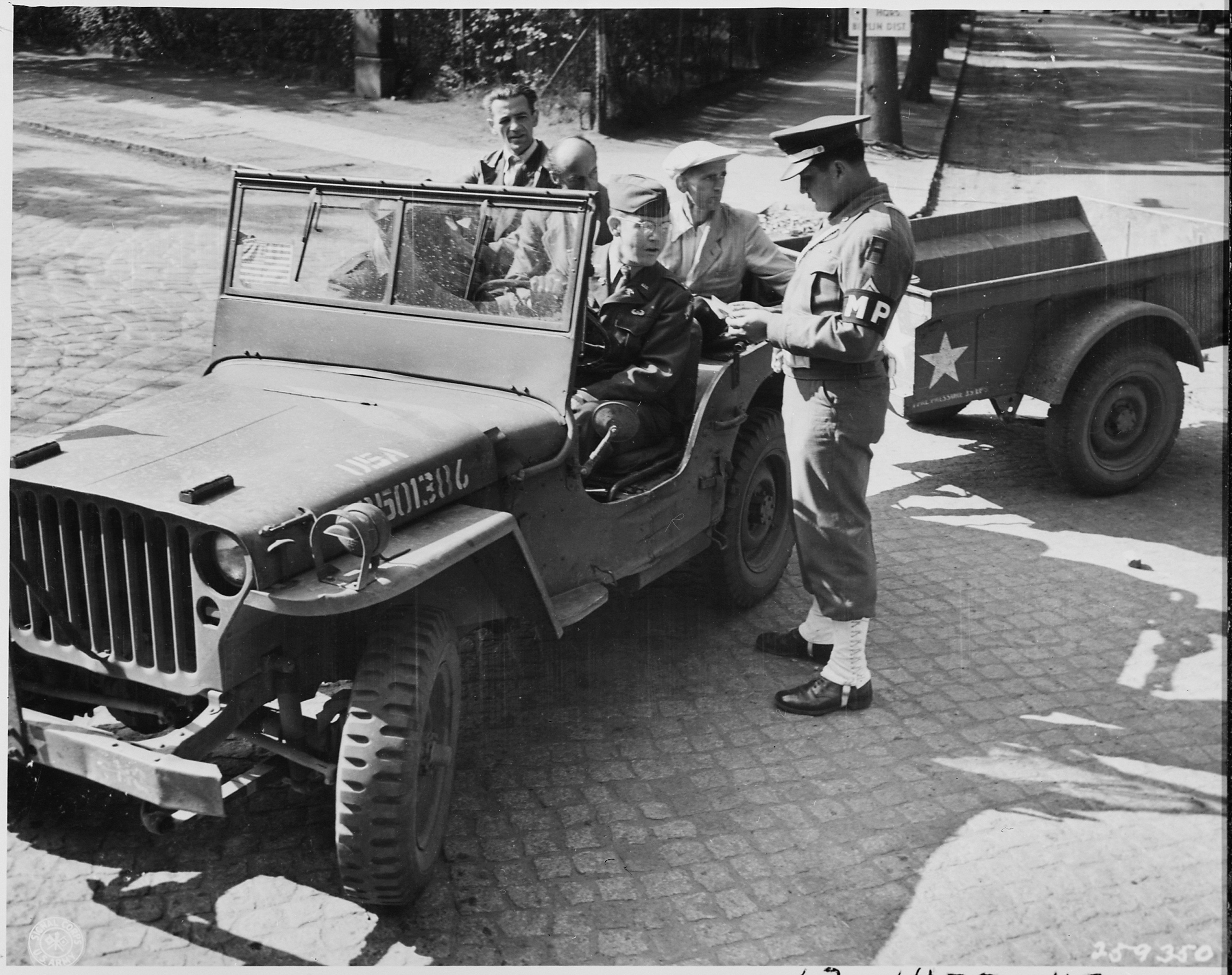
The 1/4-ton cargo trailer was first created for the World War II jeep

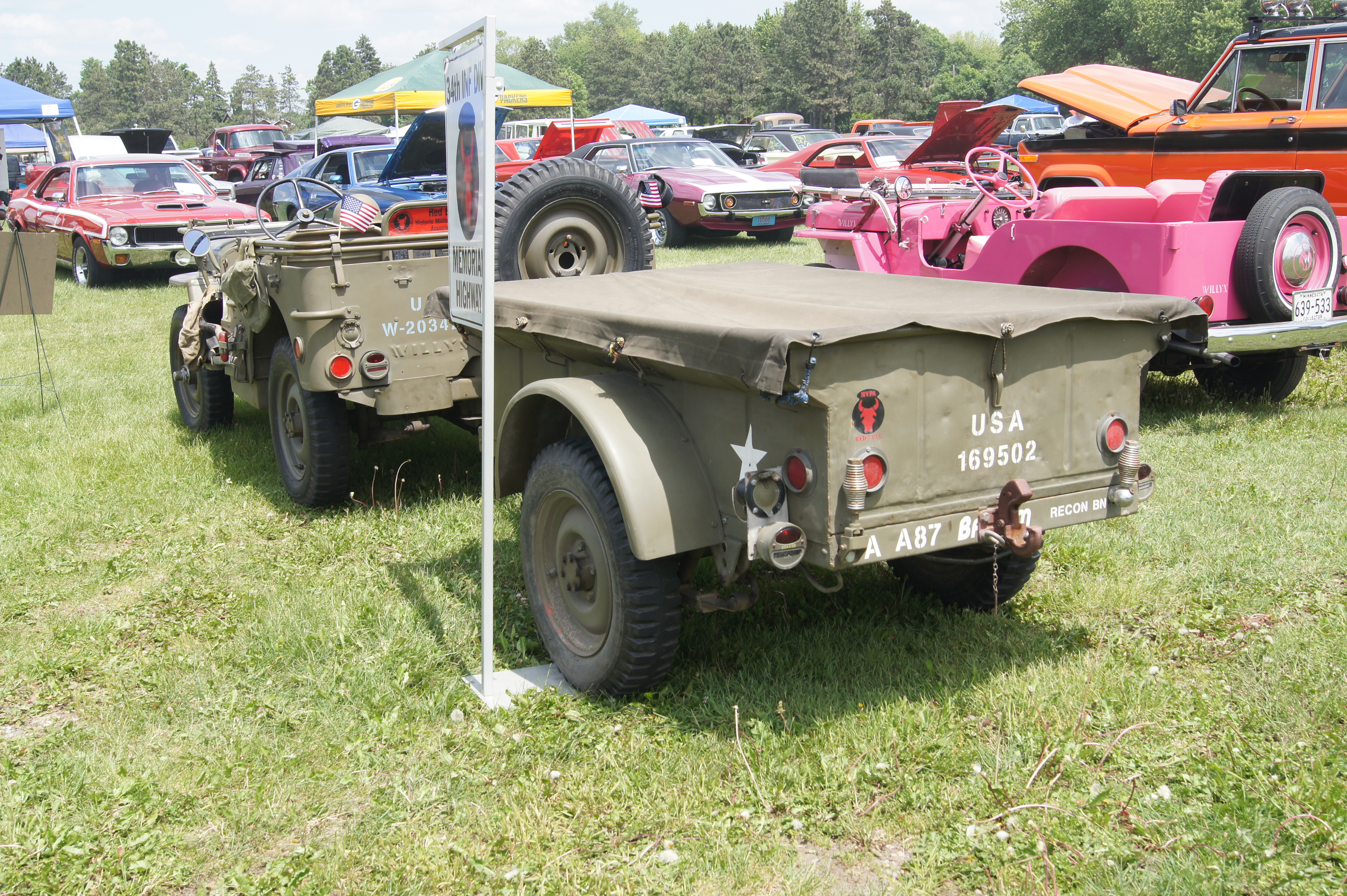
1941 jeep with trailer – rear

The Jeep trailer was a small, 1/4 short ton (0.22 long tons; 0.23 t) payload rated, cargo trailer, designed in World War II, tailored to be towed by 1/4-ton jeeps. Versions of the quarter-ton jeep trailer remained in military use, by the U.S. or other countries, at least through to the 1990s.

== History ==
When the jeep was developed, it needed a cargo trailer that would track behind the vehicle. The first trailer was called the "Trailer, 1/4-ton, 2-Wheel, Cargo, Amphibian". More than 150,000 jeep trailers were built by over ten different companies, during World War II alone. American Bantam built some 75,000 of their T-3, and kept building jeep trailers after the war. Willys-Overland also built more than 60,000 of their MBT units (Willys MB Trailers). Other manufacturers contributed only hundreds, or just a few thousand units. A special trailer was the Converto (Airborne) Dump Trailer, of which several thousand were built.

Later versions of the trailer were the M100 trailer for the Willys M38 jeep and the M416 trailer for the M151 jeep.

The World War II quarter-ton jeep trailer (picture 1 and 2 from manual; photo is WWII Bantam original)
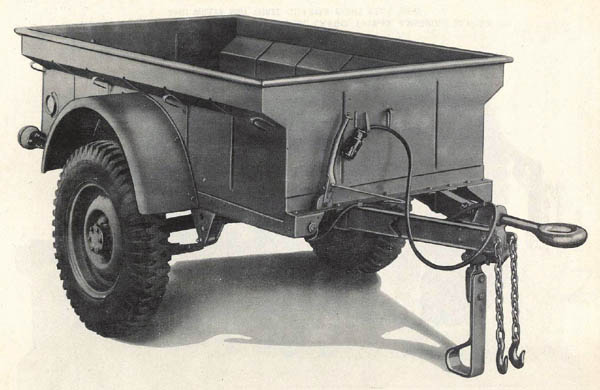
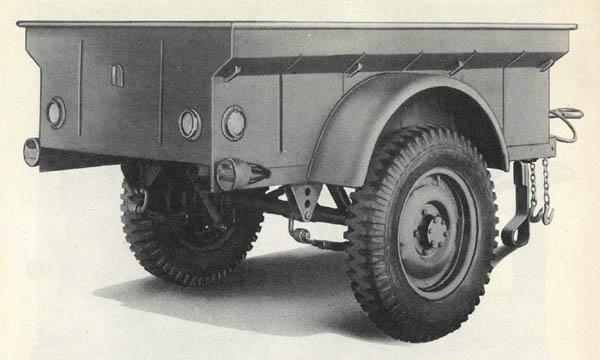
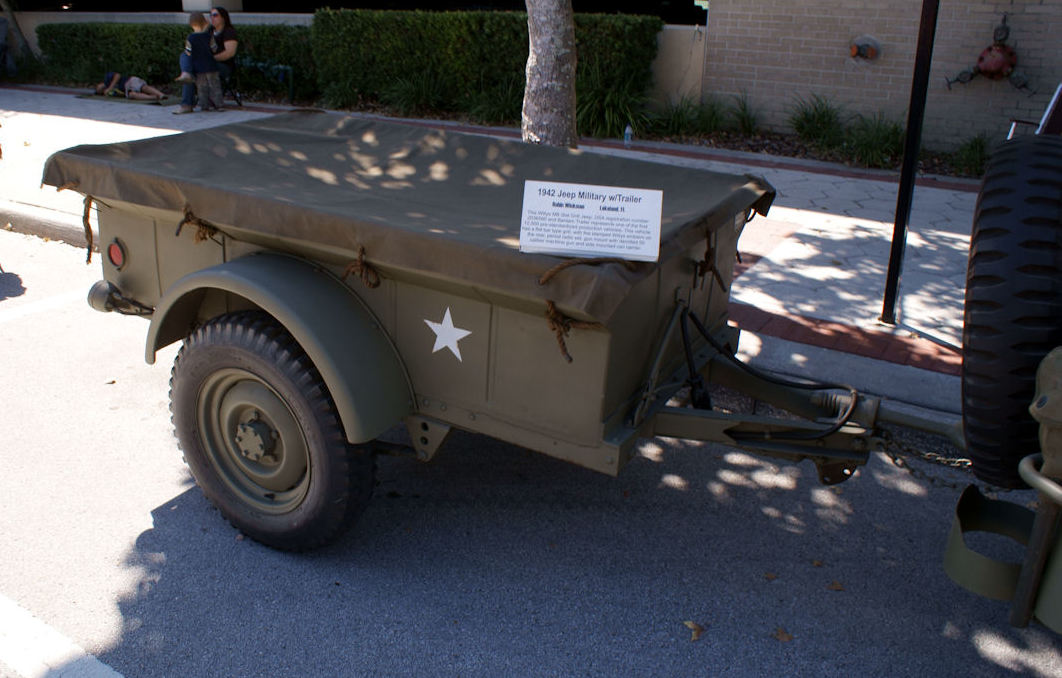

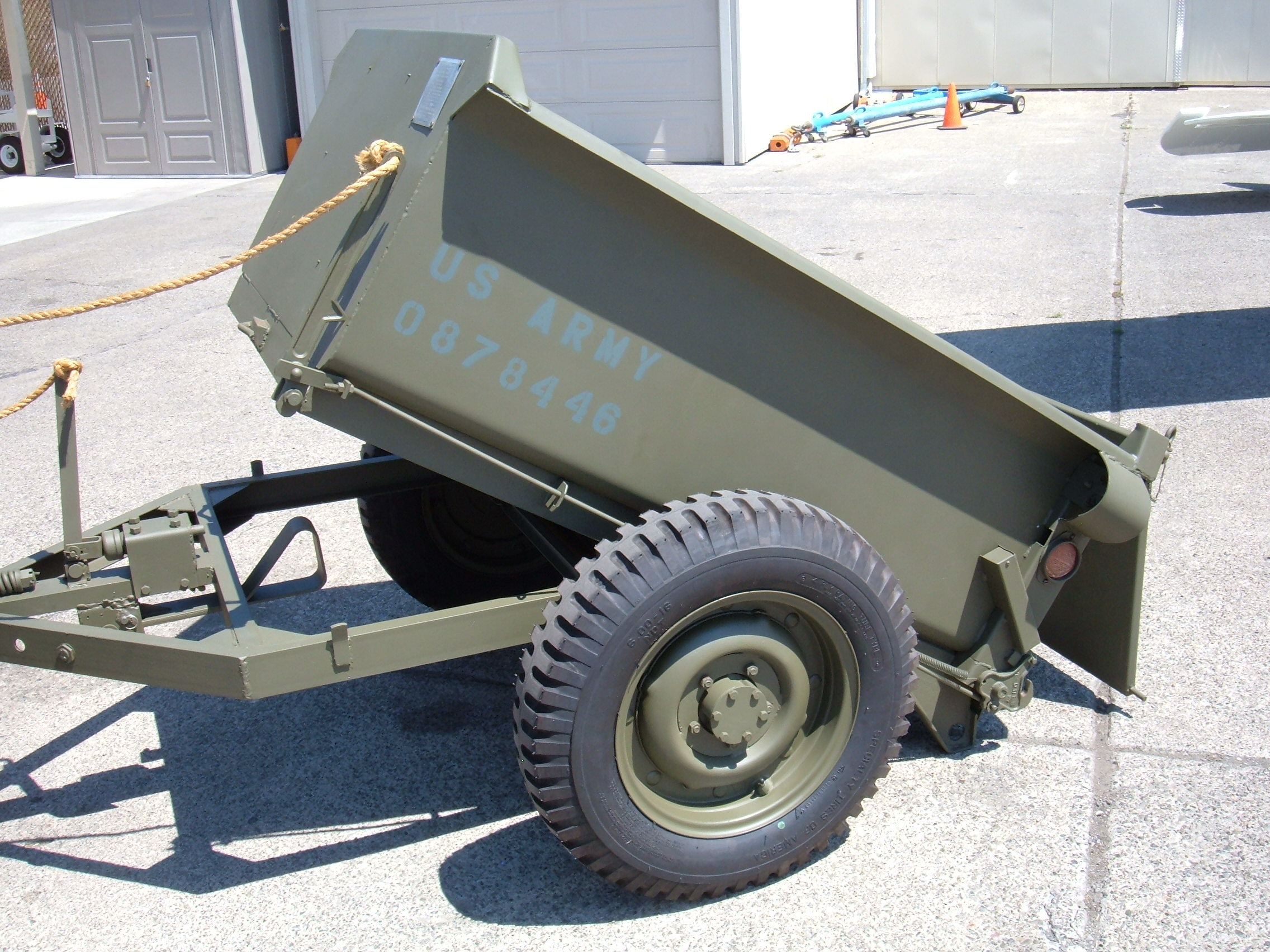
The 1945 Converto T6/T7 Airborne Dump Trailer for Willys MB Jeeps, was made in limited numbers.

== Versions ==
- The World War II version came in both the standard, and K-38A versions. the K-38A was a modification of the K-38 trailer for the U.S. Army Signal Corps
- The Korean War version, or M100 was also modified into the M367 trailer for the Signal corps. and also came in a plain chassis the M116.
- The Canadian Army version, or M100CDN very closely resembles the M100, except it was manufactured in Winnipeg at Motor Coach Industries (MCI) for the Canadian Army.
- The Vietnam War version, or M416 came in the following variants: M416 and M416A1 with square fenders, dedicated for the M151 jeep; the M416B1 towed by the USMC M422 'Mighty Mite' helicopter liftable jeep, the M569 chassis, and the V-498 trailer for AN/TTC-41.

== Post-World War II ==
After World War II, several companies went on to produce these trailers for the civilian market. The military trailers often were rated for 1/4 ton usage for the sake of amphibious operations, many trailer designs were in actuality built to handle 1/2 ton loads with ease. In the post-war civilian world, many trailers were marketed as able to handle 1/2 to 3/4 ton weight loads.

Notable companies were Bantam with the T3-C, Henry Spen with the Model S, as well as Converto, Knox, and David Bradley. While the trailers maintained utility and ruggedness, other features required by the military fell to the wayside for utility, cost, and simplicity such as tailgates, parking brakes and blackout lights. Bright colors were often favored on civilian trailers in respect to peace time markets.

Today these civilian Jeep trailers are highly sought after for camping, light duty utility, agriculture, and collections, as are the military ones. Jeep trailers also found favor with road departments, construction crews, fire departments, park departments, and many other civil services and local government in North America. Restoration data is often scant to non-existent on the civilian trailers, but military trailers often have full specifications that have been preserved and shared.

== See also ==
- List of U.S. Signal Corps vehicles
- List of U.S. military vehicles by supply catalog designation (G529),(G747), and (G857)
- List of U.S. military vehicles by model number
- Trailer (vehicle)
