= XM104 =

US self-propelled howitzer

External image
- Howitzer, self-propelled, 105 mm, XM104 prototype at the U.S. Army Artillery Museum, Fort Sill, Oklahoma.

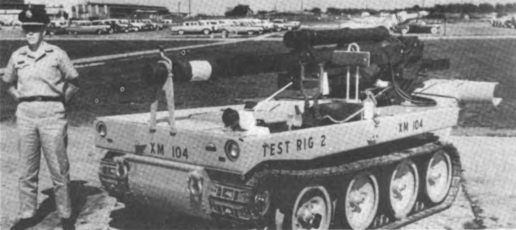
XM104 howitzer pilot model

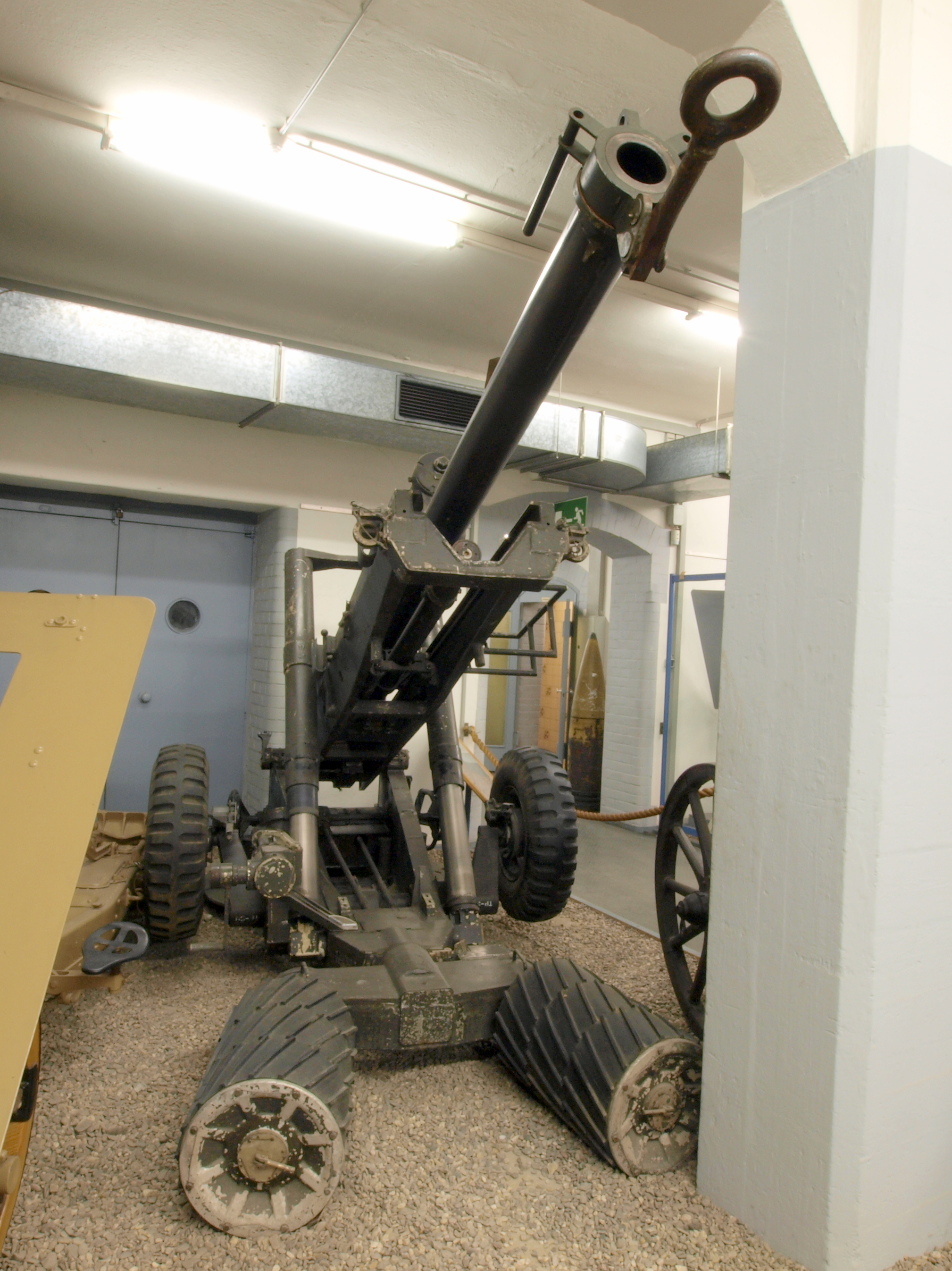
XM204 Soft Recoil Howitzer at the WTS Koblenz

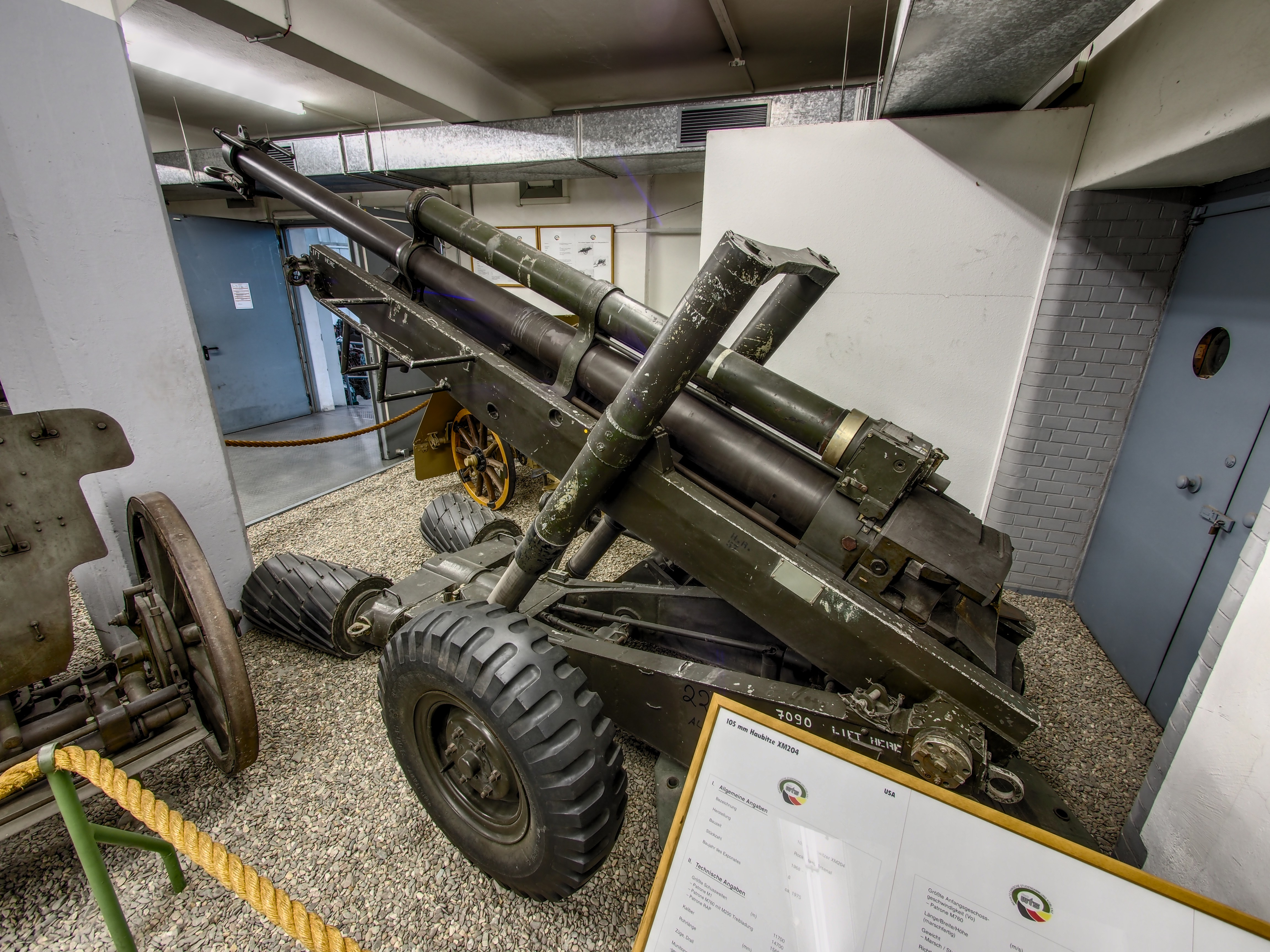
XM204 Soft Recoil Howitzer at the WTS Koblenz (Bundeswehr Museum of German Defense Technology)

The XM104 was a U.S.-developed self-propelled amphibious/air-droppable/heliborne 105 mm howitzer. Pilot models of the howitzer were built by the U.S. Army Ordnance Tank Automotive Command's Experimental Division at the Detroit Tank Arsenal shops, Warren, Mich. A follow-up model is known as XM204.

== Mobility ==
The vehicle represented a new concept of self-propelled artillery, it could be stripped for air delivery by helicopter, parachute drop or ground-landing by the Army's DHC-4 Caribou and Air Force C-130 Hercules. Brig. Gen. J. Frederick Thorlin, Commanding General of OTAC, said the full-tracked vehicle, designated the XM104, was developed in answer to the Army's urgent request for a "heavyweight puncher with featherweight mobility."

== Characteristics ==
XM104 had a 4-man crew, was to travel at 35 miles per hour, negotiate swamps and desert sand, cross rivers and lakes. Combat weight of the vehicle was around 6,400 pounds.

== Capabilities ==
The XM104 was designed to provide ground troops with a "scatback" artillery piece which could travel anywhere in the world with airborne combat troops. Once on line, it could follow right behind infantry or armour units.

== XM204 ==
A similar designation is known with the model XM204 Soft Recoil Howitzer, which had swamp-rollers and could be towed by trucks. With this artillery piece the army examined also an airborne version with Boeing CH-47 Chinook helicopters. The aerial artillery design Study is known as: Two Externally Mounted XM204 Howitzers on a CH-47C Helicopter
