= M425 and 426 tractor truck =

5-ton 4x2 tractor truck (C. O. E.)
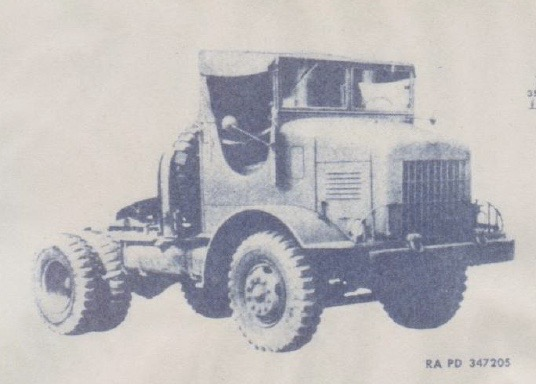
- M426 tractor truck
- Type: 5-ton 4x2 semi-tractor
- Place of origin: United States

Production history
- Designer: International Harvester
- Manufacturer: International, Kenworth; Marmon-Herrington
- Produced: 1944-1945
- No. built: M425: 4,640; M426: 10,978

Specifications (M426)
- Mass: 11,963 lb (5,426 kg) (empty)
- Length: 16 feet 8 inches (5.08 m)
- Width: 8 feet 2 inches (2.49 m)
- Height: 8 feet 11 inches (2.72 m)
- Engine: IHC RD 450D; 125 hp (93 kW)
- Transmission: 5 speed
- Suspension: Beam axles on leaf springs
- Operational range: 240 mi (386.2 km)
- Maximum speed: 38 mph (61 km/h)

The M425 and M426 tractor trucks (G671) were 5 ton (4,536kg) load rated 4x2 semi-tractors that were used from 1944 on by the US Army. They are famous for the use on the Red Ball Express from Normandy to the front, but were also used in the China Burma India Theater. After the war they were used in Europe, including during the Berlin Crisis, and in the Korean War.

== History ==
Designed and first manufactured by International Harvester, later Kenworth and Marmon-Herrington also built them. The official model number was 542, to which are added a prefix letter designating the manufacturer of the engine (thus 'H' from Harvester) and a suffix number relating to the tire size. The M426 was a heavier duty evolution of the M425. All model H-542-9 M425s were built by International, H542-11 M426s were built by all three companies. 1,200 M425s were upgraded to M426 standards.

== Engine and driveline ==
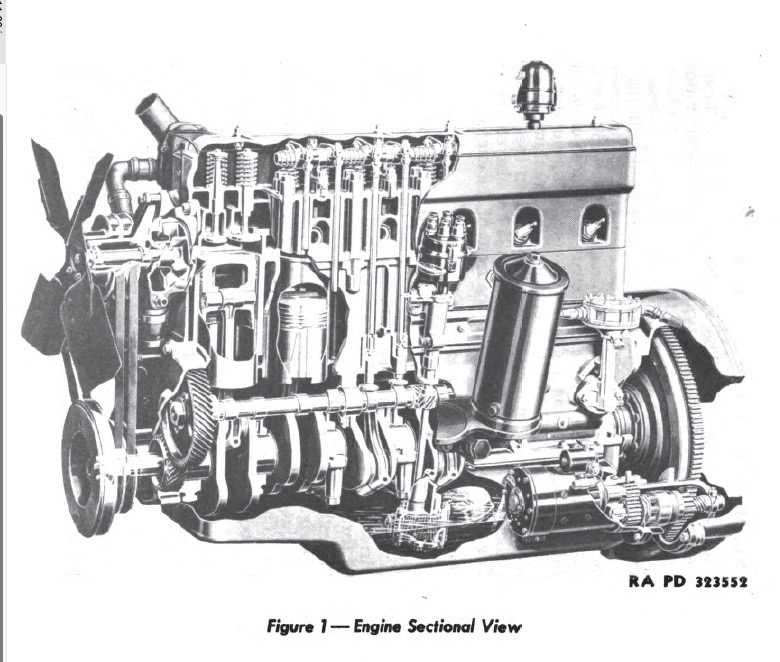
IHC Red Diamond 450D engine (cutaway view)

The engine in these vehicles was an International Red Diamond 450D, a 451 cu in (7.4 L) overhead valve inline 6 cylinder gasoline engine developing 125 hp (93 kW) at 2700 rpm.

The clutch was made by W.C. Lips, Model Z-32-S, and the transmission was an IHC Model F-54-D. This transmission had 5 forward and one reverse speed. The first speed was very low, fifth speed was direct.

== Chassis ==
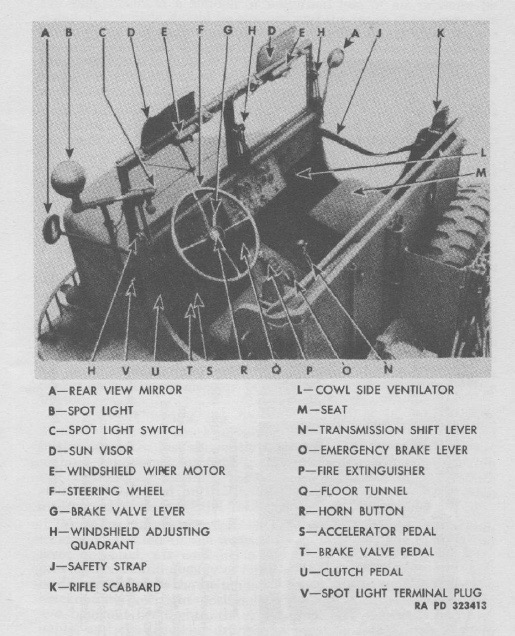
M425 cab interior view

All models had a ladder frame with two axles on semi elliptical leaf springs. A set back front axle allowed a wheelbase of only 9 feet 9 inches (2.97 m), allowing a very short turn radius.

The M425 and M426 were general service load carriers, designed to haul load over roads, so they didn't need to be 4 x 4. The front axle was an I-beam, the rear was a double reduction full floating type. International used their own front and rear axles, Kenworth and Marmon-Herrington used Timkens.

Brakes were full air with drum brakes on all wheels. Trailer brakes could be used independently of the tractor. A disk type hand brake was mounted on the propeller shaft.

M425s had 9.00x20 size tires, while M426s had larger 11.00x20s with stronger springs and a slightly longer 10 metres (32.81 ft) wheelbase. All had dual rear tires. Except for the difference in the size of the tires, and some minor details, all types are mechanically identical.

All models were a cab over engine design with a military style open cab.

== Trailers ==
The M425 towed a 7-ton (6,350kg) load rated trailer 16 ft (4.9 m) long, the M426 a 10-ton (9,072kg) trailer 25 ft (7.6 m) long. Both had a single axle with dual rear tires, and a stake-and-platform body.

== Gallery ==
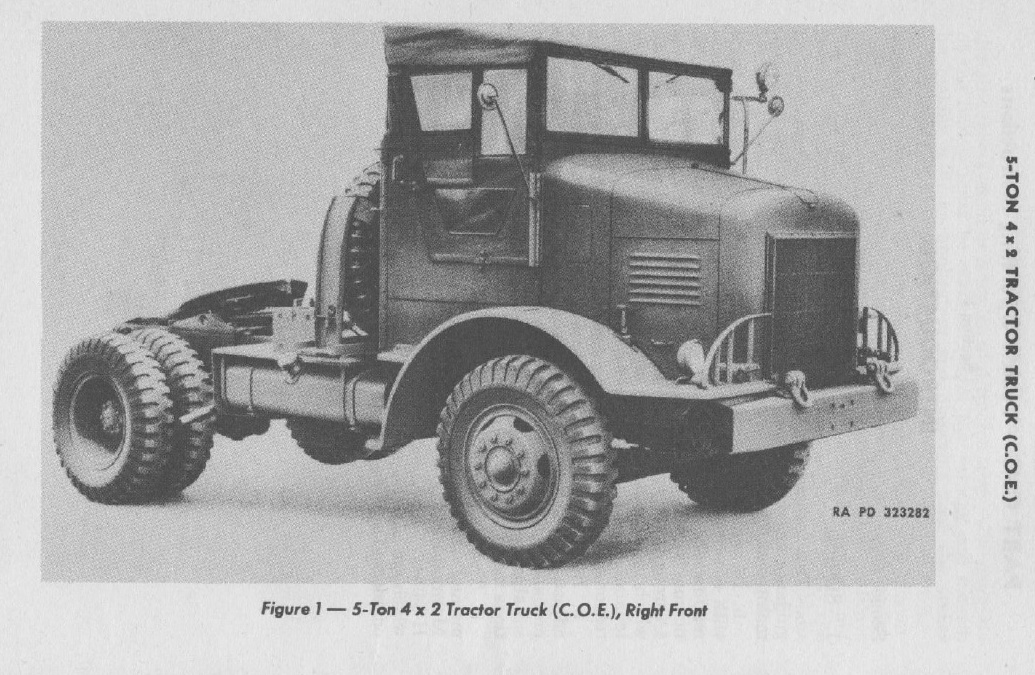
M425 with roof and doors

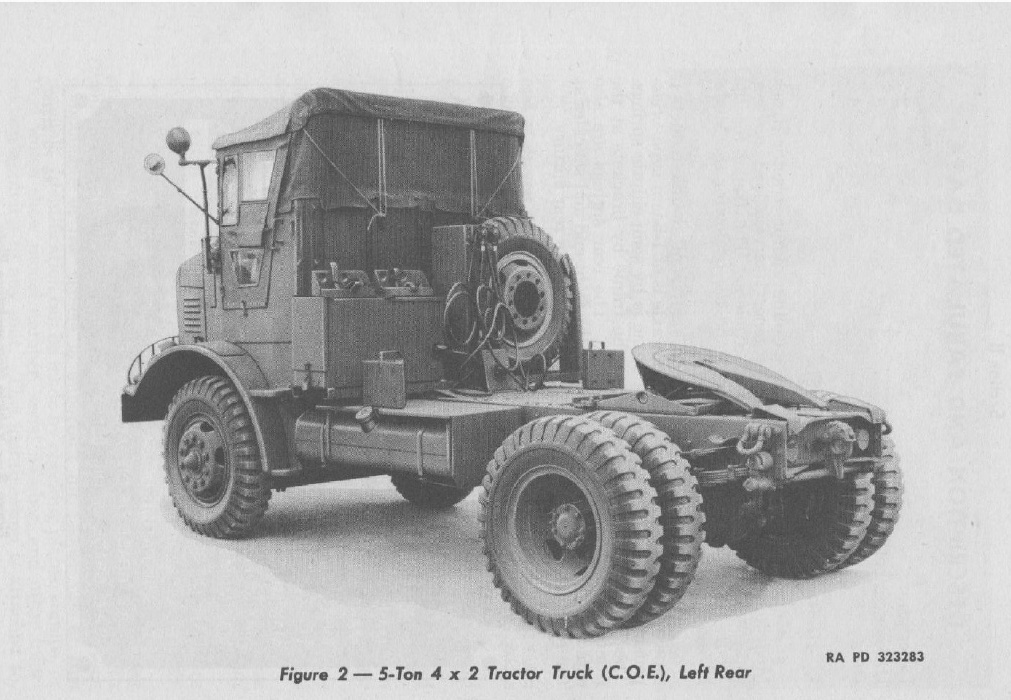
M425 with roof and doors

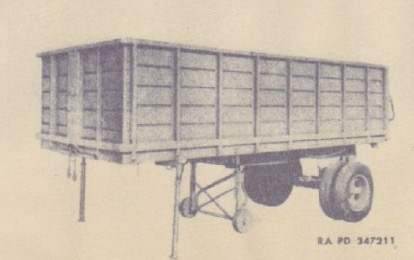
7 ton trailer

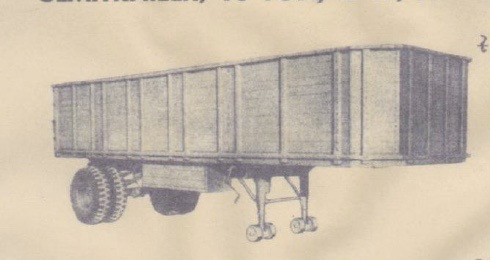
10 ton trailer
