= M416 =

Trailer, Cargo: 1/4-Ton, 2-Wheel M416
- Place of origin: United States

Service history
- Used by: United States

Specifications
- Mass: 670 lb (300 kg)
- Length: 108.5 in (2.76 m)
- Width: 60.5 in (1.54 m)
- Height: 42 in (1.1 m)
- Payload capacity: 500 lb (230 kg)
- Suspension: Multi-leaf spring suspension
- Maximum speed: Highway: 55 mph (48 kn); Improved roads: 50 mph (43 kn); Cross-country: 30 mph (26 kn)

The M416, the last of the military 1/4 ton Jeep trailers, can be distinguished from earlier 1/4 ton trailers by its squared fenders. There were two later versions, the M416A1 and the M416B1. The M416B1 used the smaller 6.00 X 16 tires on M422 wheels because it was designed to be towed by the USMC M422 'Mighty Mite' instead of the M151 that towed the M416's and M416A1's.

In addition to the smaller tires, the M416B1 also had lifting rings for airborne operations and jerry can mounts on each side. Approximately 2000 M416B1 trailers were built.

== See also ==
- G-numbers
