= Landing Vehicle, Tracked =

Amphibious transport vehicle family from World War II

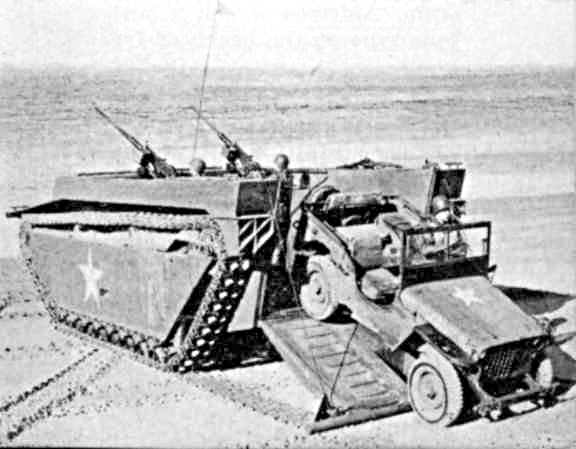
- LVT-4 unloading a Jeep
- Type: Amphibious vehicle
- Place of origin: United States

Production history
- Manufacturer: Borg-Warner; Food Machinery Corporation; Graham-Paige; Roebling; St. Louis Car Company
- Produced: July 1941 – August 1945
- No. built: 18,616 of all variants; LVT-1.......1,225; LVT-2.......2,960; LVT(A)-2..450; LVT-3.......2,962; LVT-4.......8,348; LVT-4(A)-1..509; LVT(A)-4..1,890; LVT(A)-5..269

Specifications (LVT-4)
- Mass: 36,400 lb (16,500 kg)
- Length: 26 ft 1 in (7.95 m)
- Width: 10 ft 8 in (3.25 m)
- Height: 8 ft 2 in (2.49 m)
- Crew: 2–3
- Passengers: Up to 24
- Armor: 1/4 to 1/2 inch (6.4 to 12.7 mm) if added
- Main armament: 2 × pintle-mounted 0.50 in Browning M2HB machine guns
- Secondary armament: 2 × pintle-mounted .30-06 Browning M1919A4 machine guns Various small infantry arms (when carrying assault troops)
- Engine: Continental W-670-9A; 7 cylinder, 4 stroke, air-cooled gasoline radial aircraft engine 250 hp (190 kW)
- Power/weight: 15.2 hp/t
- Payload capacity: 9,000 lb (4,100 kg) if unarmored
- Transmission: Spicer manual transmission, 5 forward and 1 reverse gears
- Suspension: Rubber torsilastic
- Fuel capacity: 140 US gallons (530 L)
- Operational range: 150 mi (240 km) on road, 75 mi (121 km) in water
- Maximum speed: 20 mph (32 km/h) on land, 7.5 mph (12.1 km/h) in water

LVT(A)-4
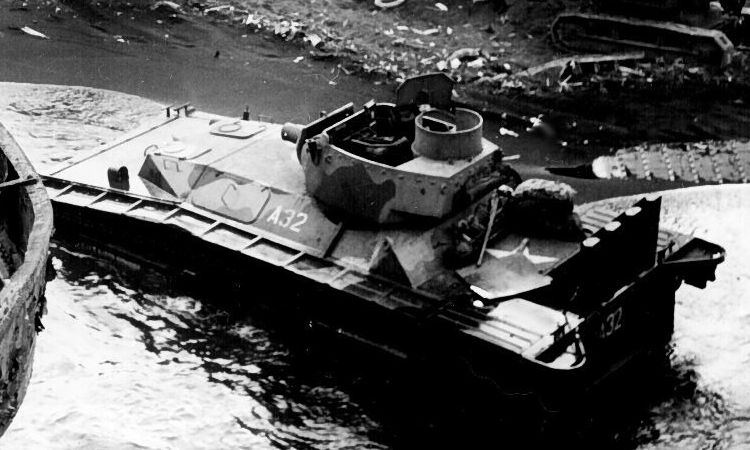
- LVT(A)-4 amtank at Iwo Jima beach, c. February/March 1945

Specifications
- Mass: 40,000 lb (18,000 kg)
- Length: 26 ft 1 in (7.95 m)
- Width: 10 ft 8 in (3.25 m)
- Height: 10 ft 2.5 in (3.112 m)
- Crew: 6 (commander, gunner, loader, assistant loader, driver, assistant driver)
- Armor: 1/4 to 1 1/2 in (6.4 to 38.1 mm)
- Main armament: 1× 75 mm M2/M3 Howitzer
- Secondary armament: 3× .30-06 Browning M1919A4 machine gun
- Engine: Continental W-670-9A; 7 cylinder, 4 cycle, radial gasoline 250 hp (190 kW)
- Power/weight: 13.9 hp/t
- Transmission: Spicer manual transmission, 5 forward and 1 reverse gears
- Suspension: Rubber torsilastic
- Fuel capacity: 106 US gallons (400 L)
- Operational range: 200 km (road), 120 km (water)
- Maximum speed: 40 km/h (25 mph), in water 11 km/h (6.8 mph)

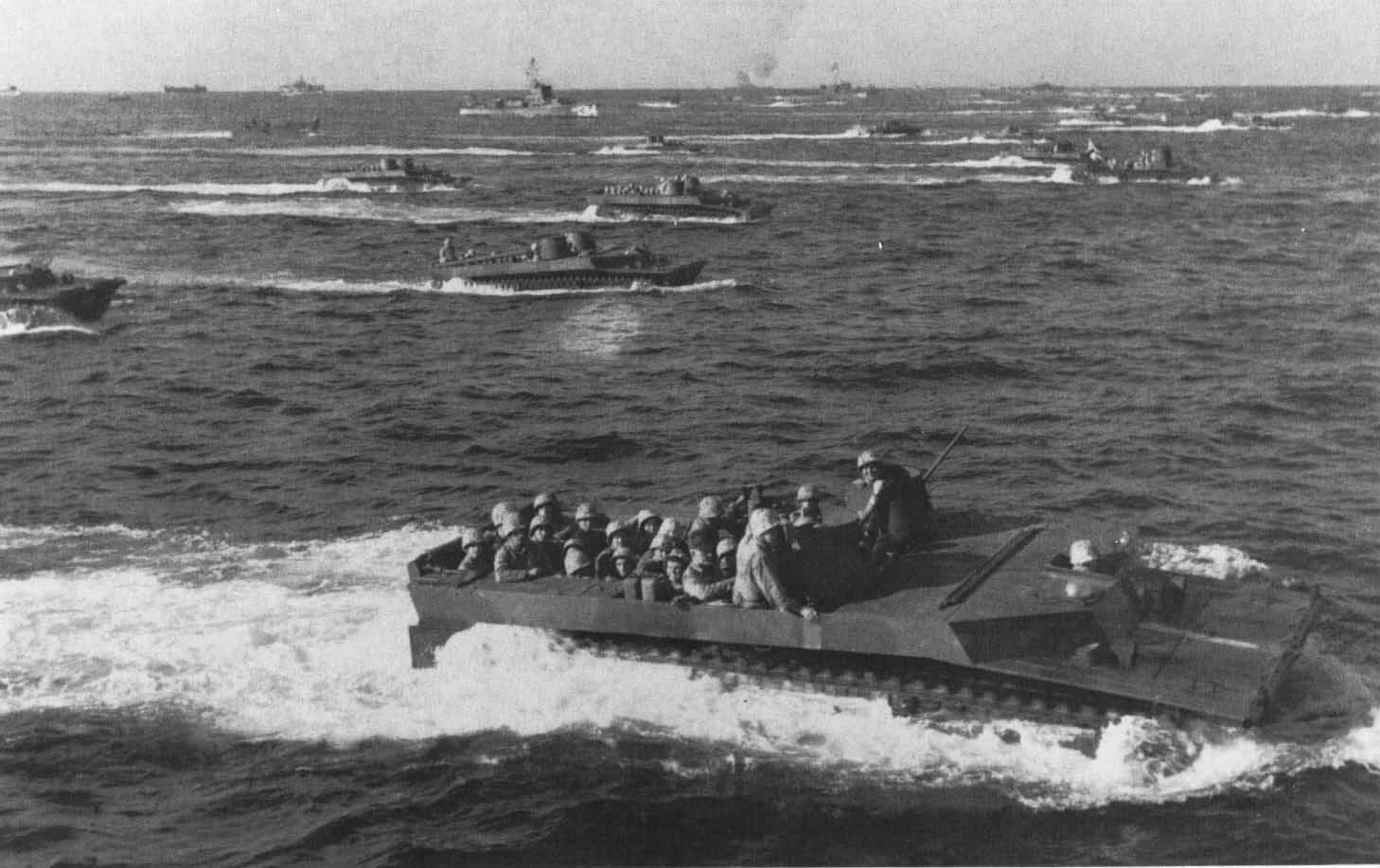
An LVT-4 approaches Iwo Jima.

The Landing Vehicle, Tracked (LVT) is an amphibious warfare vehicle and amphibious landing craft, introduced by the United States Navy. The United States Marine Corps, United States Army, and Canadian and British armies used several LVT models during World War II.

Originally intended solely as cargo carriers for ship to shore operations, they evolved into assault troop and fire support vehicles. The types were known as amphtrack, amtrak, amtrac, etc. (portmanteaus of amphibious tractor), alligator and gator.

== Development ==
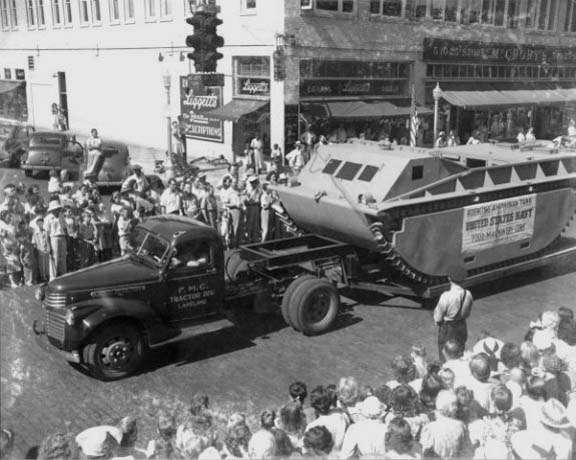
An LVT-1 exhibited by manufacturer FMC in a 1941 parade in Lakeland, Florida

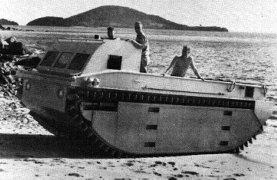
A prototype during testing, 1940

=== The Alligator ===
The LVT had its origins in a civilian rescue vehicle called the Alligator. Developed by Donald Roebling in 1935, the Alligator was intended to operate in swampy areas, inaccessible to both traditional cars and boats. Two years later, Roebling built a redesigned vehicle with improved water speed. The United States Marine Corps, which had been developing amphibious warfare doctrine based on the ideas of Lieutenant colonel Earl Hancock Ellis and others, became interested in the machine after learning about it through an article in Life magazine and convinced Roebling to design a more seaworthy model for military use.

Both the US Navy and Roebling resisted the idea of a military design; the US Navy because it felt conventional landing craft could do the job, and Roebling because he wished his invention to be used only for peaceful purposes. Roebling was persuaded after war broke out in Europe, and completed a militarized prototype by May 1940. The Bureau of Ships requested a second prototype with a more powerful engine, and the USMC tested the design in November 1940. Impressed by the second prototype, the Bureau of Ships placed a contract for production of 100 units of a model using all-steel construction, for a more rugged and easily produced design, and the first LVT-1 was delivered in July 1941. Another 200 units were ordered even before the first production units were delivered. After more improvements to meet requirements of the Navy, made difficult by Roebling's lack of blueprints for the initial designs, the vehicle was adopted as "Landing Vehicle Tracked" or LVT.

=== The LVT-1 design ===
The contract to build the first 200 LVTs was awarded to the Food Machinery Corporation (FMC), a manufacturer of insecticide spray pumps and other farm equipment, which built some parts for the Alligators. The initial 200 LVTs were built at FMC's factory in Dunedin, Florida, where most of the improvement work had been done as well. The first production LVT rolled out of the plant in July, 1941. Later, wartime LVT production was expanded by FMC and the Navy to four factories, including the initial facility in Dunedin; the new facilities were located in Lakeland, Florida, Riverside, California, and San Jose, California.

The LVT-1 could carry 18 fully equipped men or 4,500 pounds (2,000 kg) of cargo. Originally intended to carry replenishment from ships to shore, they lacked armor protection and their tracks and suspension were unreliable when used on hard terrain. However, the Marines soon recognized the potential of the LVT as an assault vehicle. A battalion of LVTs was ready for 1st Marine Division by 16 February 1942. The LVTs saw their first operational use in Guadalcanal, where they were used exclusively for landing supplies. About 128 LVTs were available for the landings.

=== LVT-2 Buffalo and other developments ===
As early as January 1940, Roebling had prepared preliminary sketches of an LVT with a gun turret to provide fire support to the landing waves. The concept languished until June 1941, when USMC recommended development of an LVT armed with a 37mm gun and three machine guns and armored against 0.50 (12.7mm) machine gun fire. Development was slow and ultimately involved a complete redesign of the LVT, the LVT-2 Buffalo. Armored versions were introduced as well as fire support versions, dubbed Amtanks, which were fitted with turrets from Stuart series light tanks (LVT(A)-1) and howitzer motor carriage M8s (LVT(A)-4).

Among other upgrades were a new powerpack (engine and cooling accessories), also borrowed from the Stuarts, and a rubber "torsilastic" suspension which improved performance on land. After Borg-Warner evaluated the LVT-1, Borg-Warner and FMC began work on new designs. FMC was assisted by faculty from Caltech and the University of California and developed the designs that became the LVT-2 and the LVT(A)-1. Interest in the LVT was enough that the Secretary of the Navy formed the Continued Board for the Development of the Landing Vehicle Tracked on 30 October 1943.

Production continued throughout the war, resulting in 18,616 LVTs delivered. 23 US Army and 11 USMC battalions were equipped by 1945 with LVTs. British and Australian armies also used LVTs in combat during World War II.

In the late 1940s, a series of prototypes were built and tested, but none reached production stage due to lack of funding. Realizing that acquisition of new vehicles was unlikely, the Marines modernized some of the LVT-3s and LVT(A)-5s under projects SCB-60B and SCB-60A respectively, and kept them in service until the late 1950s.

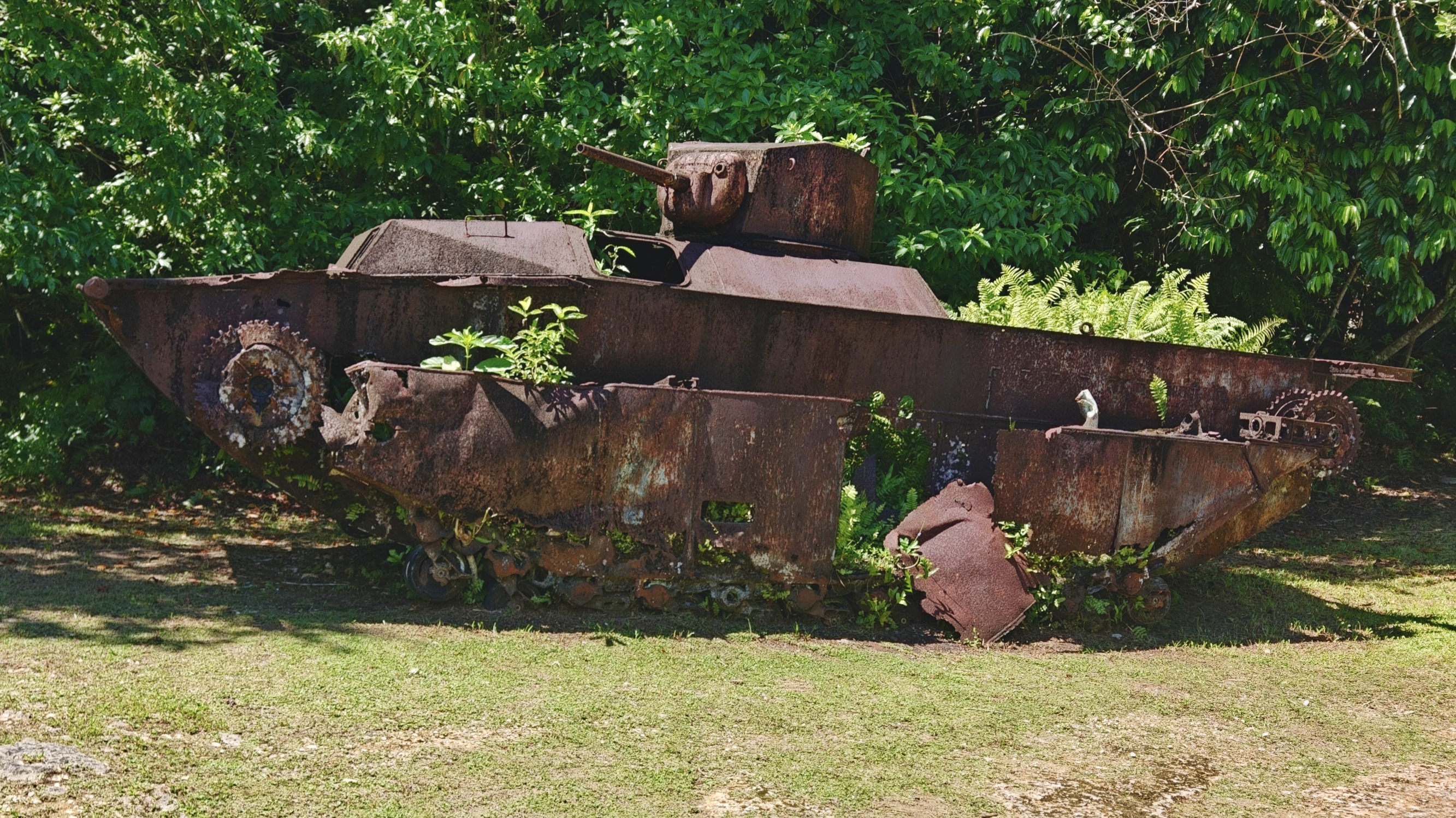
The Relic of an LVT-2 from the battle in 1944 on the Island of Peleliu, Relocated here from an unknown site

== Combat history ==
=== WWII Pacific Theatre ===
==== Guadalcanal ====
USMC LVT-1s were mainly used for logistical support at Guadalcanal. LVT-1 proved in this campaign its tactical capabilities, versatility and potential for amphibious operations.

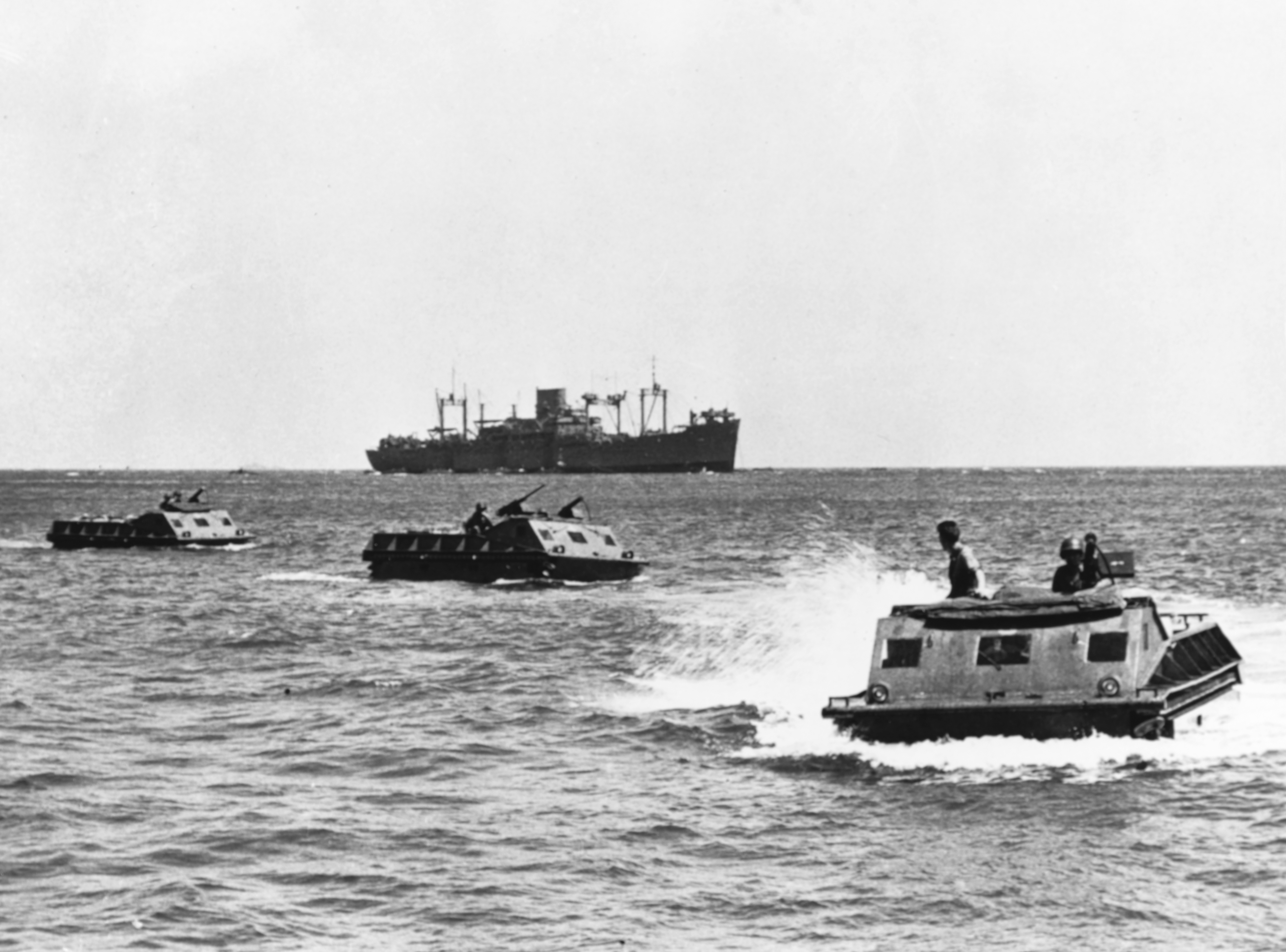
LVT-1s move toward the beach on Guadalcanal. The USS President Hayes (AP-39) is seen in the background.

As LVT-1s were unarmed, the Marines decided to arm them using any available machine gun. Each one was armed with three .30-caliber machine guns (sometimes water-cooled models) and a .50-caliber machine gun. Organization of LVTs of the Amphibian Tractor Battalions for the assault:

- Company "A" of 1st Battalion with thirty LVT-1 was assigned to the 5th Marines which was to land on Guadalcanal.
- A platoon of LVT-1s assigned to 2nd Marine Battalion went ashore on Tulagi.
- Company "B" was assigned to the 1st Marine Regiment.
- The remainder of the 1st Battalion remained with the 1st Division's support group.
- Company "A" of the 2nd Battalion was assigned to 2nd Marine Regiment, the landing force reserve.

==== Tarawa ====
In the amphibious assault on Tarawa in late 1943, the LVTs were first used for amphibious assault in order to negotiate the barrier reef, where several Higgins Boats had run aground and became stuck, and arrive to the most heavily defended beaches the Americans ever met in the Pacific. This was also the first use of the LVT-2 Water Buffalo in combat. 2nd Amphibian Tractor Battalion LVTs took part in the first, second, and third waves of landings and carried the continuous supply of ammunition, reinforcements, and ferrying back of the wounded. Of 125 vehicles used (50 new LVT-2s and 75 LVT-1s), only 35 remained operational by the end of the first day, continuing to ferry men and supplies across the coral reef and through the shallows to the beach.

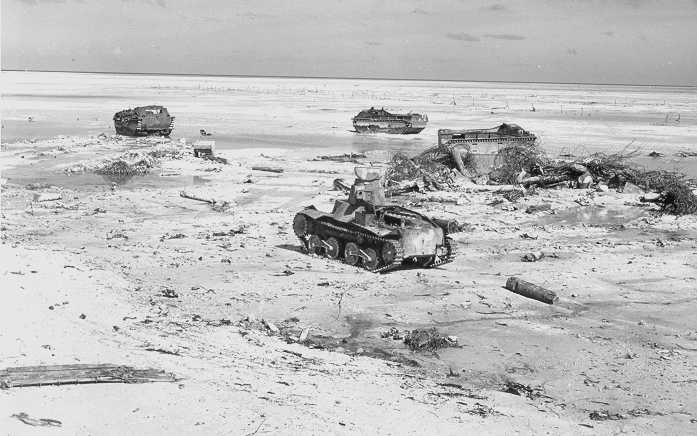
Disabled LVTs and a Type 95 light tank on Tarawa

The 2nd Amphibian Tractor Battalion had only about 79 LVT-1s and 50 LVT-2s (directly shipped from San Diego) available for the assault. Most of the troops had to disembark from LCVP "Higgins boats" and wade across the reef in chest-deep or higher water while under heavy enemy fire. American casualties were very heavy and many who made it to the beach alive had lost their rifles and other essential gear.

==== Design developments in the Pacific ====
After Tarawa, many changes were made. The USMC recommended that a battalion of armored LVTs, two companies of DUKWs and two battalions of cargo LVTs be assigned to each division in future amphibious operations. The number of LVTs by battalion was increased to 300; before Tarawa it was 100. Due to mechanical reliability problems after every landing, the Marines replaced all LVTs used in operations.

As a result of Tarawa experience, standardized armor kits were provided for the LVTs to be used in contested landings. Other improvements were made in the damage repair area, machine gun shields, and in the LVT design to increase crew and LVT survivability.

The gun-armed "amtank" LVT(A)-1 and LVT(A)-4 were developed to provide fire support. Armed with a 75mm howitzer, the latter was introduced in 1944 just before the Marianas campaign and was especially effective in this role as it was capable of destroying Japanese fortifications as it came ashore. Its howitzer complemented the 75mm gun of the M4 Sherman tanks used by the Marines. However, the LVT(A)-4 had an open-topped turret which left the crew vulnerable to artillery and infantry attack, especially to the latter, as it lacked any sort of machine gun armament. The lack of machine gun armament was eventually rectified, though the open-topped turret remained in order to save weight. Although usually used in a direct role during landings only (once inland the "amtanks" were assigned to artillery formations to augment their firepower), in the Marianas campaign "amtanks" were employed inland, much like regular tanks.

==== Bougainville, Marshall Islands and Saipan ====
In November 1943, US Marines landed on the island of Bougainville. 29 LVTs were landed on the first day, with a total of 124 LVTs operating with the Marines during the landing.

In the campaign for the Marshall Islands, the full range of the LVT models became available, including armed Amtrac LVTs based on the proven LVT-2 with a tank gun turret. This provided close-in firepower as the cargo LVTs neared the beach. The combination of armoured cargo LVT-2 and the armed LVT(A)-1 together helped to capture the Marshalls far ahead of schedule.

Saipan saw the massive use of the LVTs by the USMC with six battalions of cargo LVT, including the new ramped LVT-4, and two battalions of armored Amtracs, employing the new LVT(A)-4 with a 75 mm howitzer.

==== Tinian and Peleliu ====
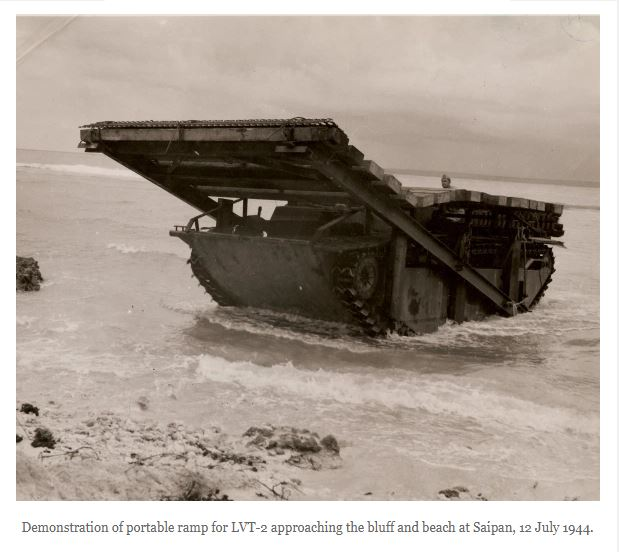
LVT-2 doodlebug in testing on Saipan

At Tinian a field variant of the LVT-2 was created by the Seabees of the 3rd Battalion 18th Marines and 3rd Battalion 20th Marines. V Amphibious Corps chose beaches abutted by coral embankments up to 15 feet. The Japanese thought the embankments made the beaches unsuitable for a landing. The CB engineers constructed detachable ramps mounted on LVTs to make such an assault possible. Salvaging iron beams from the damaged sugar factory on Saipan they fabricated 10 assault vehicles. Their commander, General Harry Schmidt, was skeptical and ordered a vehicle go up and down a ramp 100 times before approving their use in combat. The Tinian assault was a success. The defenders were quickly overwhelmed compromising the remainder of the defenses. The Seabees named their LVTs "doodlebugs".

From the Peleliu campaign on, a number of LVTs were fitted with a flamethrower for use against fortifications. The LVT was usually flanked by a pair of gun tanks for protection. A number of LVTs were converted to armored ambulances carrying a doctor and three corpsmen. LVTs were also employed as guide boats for tanks unloading onto submerged reefs.

==== Philippines ====
The largest use of LVTs was in the Leyte landing in October 1944, with nine US Army amtrac and two amtank battalions deployed by US Army Sixth Army. These US Army LVTs were later used in other Philippine islands landings. 54 LVT(4) tracked amphibious assault vehicles of the 672nd Amphibian Tractor Battalion as part of the raiding force on 23 February 1945 forged across Laguna de Bay and crashed the gates during the liberation of Los Baños Internment Camp. They ferried the weakened liberated civilians back behind the lines during the contested withdrawal.

The US Army 826th Amphibious Tractor Battalion provided Company A to land 43rd Infantry Division troops in first wave of this first American return to the Philippine Islands. Following the landing Company A "amphibs" were utilized to transport dead and wounded, carry supplies inland and provide support throughout the invasion and subsequent taking of Leyte. Company A vehicles brought troops for the second major landing on Leyte at Ormoc. The Battalion provided vehicles for the landing at Luzon as well and during the conquest of Luzon personnel were heavily involved in clean-up operations of Japanese troops left behind the advance.

==== Volcano and Ryukyu Islands campaign ====
The LVT-4 played a crucial role both as the assault vehicle to carry troops and as the chief logistical vehicle in the first days of Battle of Iwo Jima. Ashore, the LVTs were used to rescue wheeled vehicles that could not navigate Iwo Jima's soft volcanic ash and steep terraces. In addition, American troops used the LVTs to transport casualties from the front lines to evacuation sites on the beaches. The 75 mm howitzer on the LVT-4 provided important fire support as the Marines slowly advanced across the island.

Okinawa was the largest landing in the Central Pacific drive. The new LVT-3, which featured a redesign of the arrangement of the powertrain, was used successfully through the long Battle of Okinawa. Over 1,000 LVTs took part in the campaign.

=== Europe ===
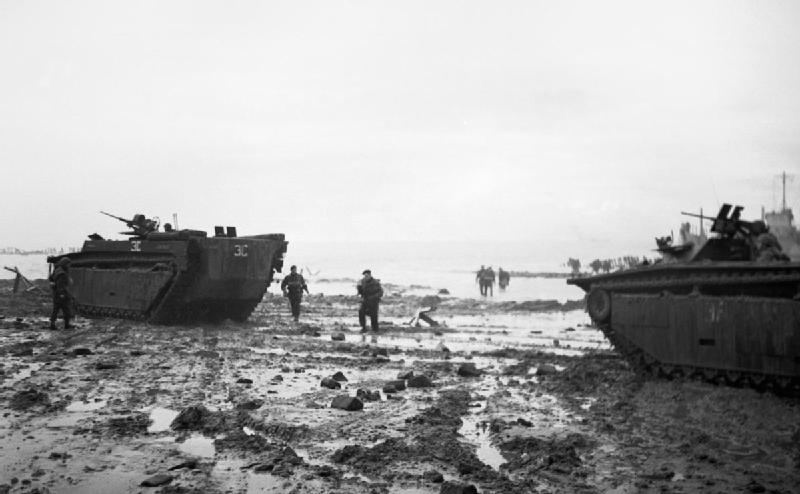
Buffalo amphibians at Westkapelle during the invasion of Walcheren Island, 1 November 1944

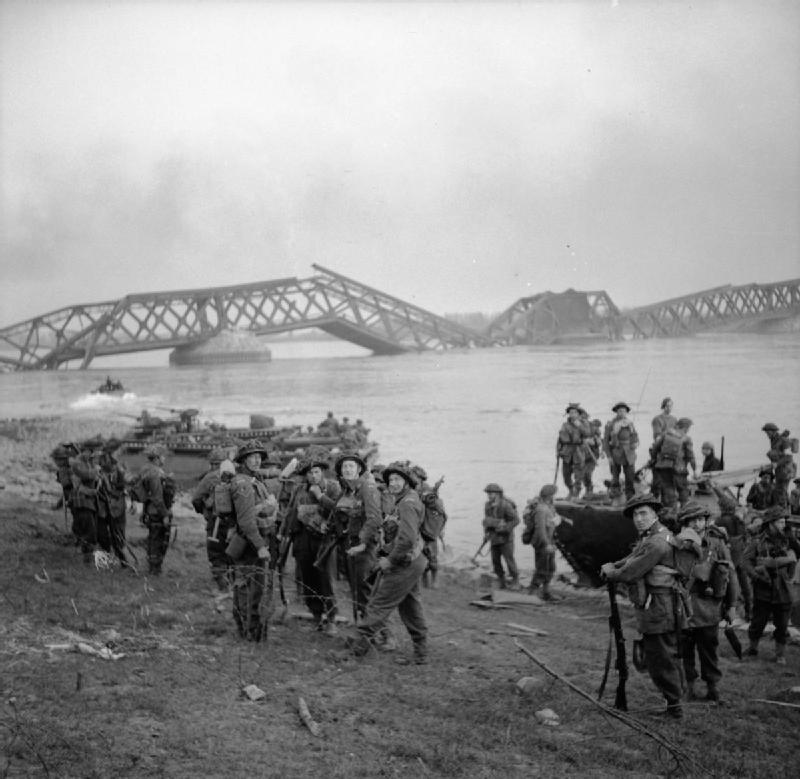
Soldiers of the Cheshire regiment ferried across the Rhine near the Wesel railway bridge.

In Europe, LVTs were mainly used for landings and river crossing operations as well as assaults in swampy zones. By the end of 1943, 200 LVT-1s had been delivered to the British Army for training in preparation for future operations in Europe. The U.S., British, and Canadian armies used the Buffalo in the 1944 Battle of the Scheldt in the Low Countries, during Operation Plunder crossing of the Rhine in March 1945, along the Po River in Italy, across the river Elbe, and in a number of other river crossing operations.

LVTs were used in the Normandy landings, but their use by the United States was limited as the US Army doctrine in Europe viewed the Sherman DD as the answer to assault on heavily defended beaches. LVT-2s were used to help unload supplies after the landings on Utah Beach from the cargo ships off the coast to the beach and through the nearby swamps.

For the Rhine crossing, the British 21st Army Group had some 600 Buffalos available, most of them used to transport the assault infantry. As mud was expected to hamper the Sherman DD tanks, some LVTs were armed with a 20 mm cannon and two machine guns to give fire support until bridges could be constructed across the river. The "Specials" were under the 79th Armoured Division (which operated and coordinated the use of all specialist assault vehicles), that also provided Buffalos fitted with "Bobbin" carpets to create temporary roadways over the mud.

The US Army used LVT-2s and LVT-4s in Europe in small numbers in 1944–45 for river crossing operations. LVT-2s and LVT-4s were used by US troops on the Roer River crossing in 1945. US Army LVT-4's were also used by 752nd Tank Battalion to ferry 88th Infantry Division troops across the Po River in Italy in April 1945.

Five LVT-4s were supplied through Lend-Lease to the Soviet Red Army, which used them when assaulting the well-defended west banks of the Oder and Danube rivers.

=== North Africa ===
The first operational use of the LVT in North Africa was in November 1942. A small number of LVT-1s were used during the landings on the coast of North Africa during Operation Torch. Four LVT-1s and two bulldozers were assigned to each shore party engineer company. Their tasks were towing vehicles and boat salvage operations. LVT-1s proved useful in getting stranded landing craft afloat, but they also experienced many mechanical failures.

=== South East Asia ===
Some of the reconnaissance units of the British Fourteenth Army in Burma operated LVT-1s. Although originally planned to fight against the Japanese on the Burmese coast at the end of 1943, this part of the operations plan was cancelled and no LVT-1s were used in combat. In 1945, the Royal Marines Amphibious support unit was created. Its LVT-4s and LVT(A)-4s supported Royal Marines landings in Burma and Malaya.

=== Post-World War II ===
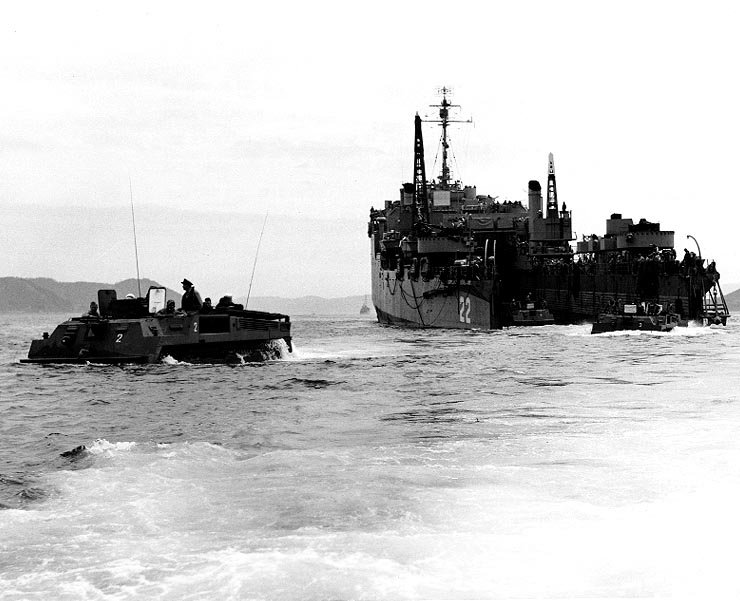
LVTs embarking Royal Marine commandos leave the dock landing ship USS Fort Marion for the beach at Sorye Dong, North Korea, on 7 April 1951.

Some LVT-3s, LVT-3Cs, and modified LVT(A)-5s saw action in the Korean War. The French Army used the U.S.-supplied LVT-4s and LVT(A)-4s in the Indochina War and in the Suez Crisis. During the Korean War, LVT(3)Cs and LVT(A)s were used for the landing in Incheon and subsequent Han River crossing to re-take Seoul. It was also used in the evacuation of Hungnam Harbour when Chinese forces attacked. The LVT(3)C was used by USMC in Korea as both an amphibious vehicle, and in the role of an armored personnel carrier while on land. Nationalist China (ROC) forces used some US-provided LVT-4s and LVT(A)-4s during China's civil war against communist Chinese troops. Many were captured by communist Chinese forces, with at least several dozen refitted with a Soviet ZiS-2 57 mm anti-tank gun in place of the original US 75 mm howitzer-gun following their successful capture of mainland China from the Chinese Nationalists in 1949.

=== French Indochina ===
French armored units developed the use of amphibious tracked vehicles in Indochina: The amphibious C model of the M29 Weasel (armed either with FM1924/29, Bren or Browning M1919 machine guns and with 57mm M18A1 recoilless guns), LVT-4s (equipped with two M2 and two M1919 machine guns, and sometimes equipped with 40mm Bofors guns or 57 mm recoilless guns) and LVT(A)-4 (with 75 mm howitzer) were used to great effect by 1er Régiment Etrangers de Cavalerie. In 1950, the French Army received a number of LVT-4s and LVT(A)-4s from the US to supplement M29Cs. In September 1951, the first French mixed unit (1er Groupement Autonome) was created, consisting of two squadrons of Weasels (33 each), three squadrons of LVT-4 (11 each) and one fire support platoon of 6 LVT(A)-4. Later a second group was created in Tonkin when more LVTs were received. Both these groups participated in Mekong and Red River delta operations and in landing operations on Vietnam shores. The 1er régiment de chasseurs à cheval also deployed a platoon of LVTs. LVTs were known as "alligators" in French armed forces.

=== Suez ===
During the 1956 Suez Canal crisis, 40 and 42 Commando of the Royal Marines made a landing in Port Said in LVTs, supported by a number of Centurion tanks from the Royal Tank Regiment. The French Navy assigned 13 LVT-4s to the Force H, to be used by the 1ère compagnie du 1er R.E.P. and 3eme Marine Commando during their assault on Port Fuad.

== Other operators ==
At the end of the war, the oldest LVT versions were disposed as surplus and sold to other countries. Only LVT-3 and LVT(A)-5s remained in operational use in the US armed forces. In 1947 a dozen Buffalo LVTs were used by the British Army to fix a breach in the flood defenses at Crowland in Lincolnshire fens following the terrible winter that year. Five LVTs were swept away and lost in flood waters. On 29 April 2021 one of the missing vehicles was excavated from 30 feet below the surface after being located in an English field. (See also #Preservation.) During Operation Highjump, the United States Navy Antarctic Developments Program from 1946 to 1947, LVT-3s and LVT-4s were tested in Antarctic conditions.

== Modern descendants ==
In the 1950s, LVTs still in service were replaced by the LVTP-5 family of vehicles (which prevailed in a competition over the LVT-6, a navalized M59); the LVTP-5 in turn were followed by the LVT-7 family, eventually redesignated Amphibious Assault Vehicle (AAV). The AAV is manufactured by BAE Systems Land and Armaments, which is the successor company to FMC.

In 1958, the US Navy tested the largest LVT ever produced, the LVT(U)X2 Goliath produced by Pacific Car and Foundry. The Goliath was large enough to transport any load the conventional Landing Craft Utility could carry, including a 60-ton main battle tank, from a landing dock ship to shore and across beach barriers. Only one Goliath was built and it never became operational.

Currently, many of the world's militaries employ more modern versions of the amtrack. One of the latest is the now cancelled United States Marine Corps Expeditionary Fighting Vehicle, that was slated to begin replacing the AAV in 2015 but was cancelled in 2011 after going significantly over budget.

== Variants ==
The US Army used a different naming system from the Navy but instead of using the usual Army system of Model (M)-numbers, they referred to the LVTs by Mark number using Roman numerals rather than Arabic numerals. Hence the LVT-4 was the "Mark IV". In British service LVTs were given service names and mark numbers to distinguish them.

=== LVT-1 ===
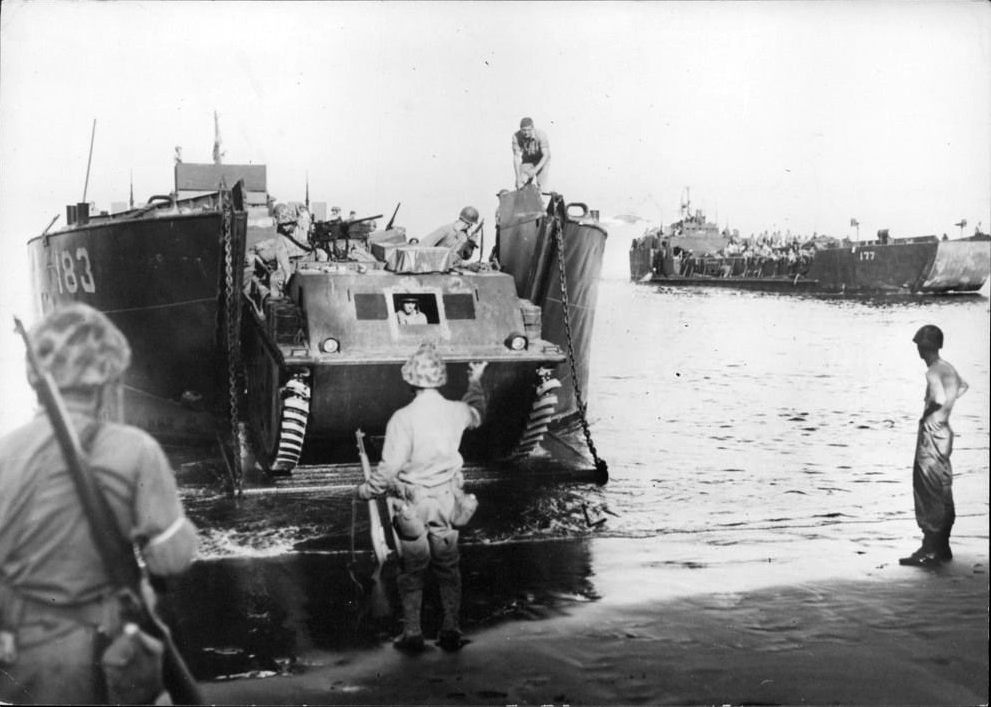
An LVT-1

The first military model. Traveling at a respectable 4 knots (7.4 km/h; 4.6 mph) laden in the water and 15 miles per hour (24 km/h) on land, it could deliver 20 fully equipped assault troops to the beach and supply supporting fire from two .30 M1919 Browning machine guns though it was only intended for delivering supplies inland until wheeled vehicles could be brought ashore. It was powered by a Hercules WXLC 146 bhp (109 kW) six-cylinder petrol engine, mounted in a housing in the rear cargo hold. The LVT-1 was propelled on both land and water by tracks which were fitted with Roebling patented oblique shoes that gave good grip on land as well as good drive in the water. A part of the forward driver's compartment, the bulk of the unarmoured steel hull was given over to a cargo area 21 ft 6 in by 9 ft 10 in which could be laden to 4,500 pounds (2,000 kg). The hold was divided into several watertight compartments. 1,225 LVT-1s were built between 1941 and 1943, 485 were transferred to the US Army and 200 to the British Army. The LVT-1 had a maximum speed of 12 mph (19 km/h) on land or 6.9 mph (11.1 km/h) in water; and a range of 210 miles (340 km) on land or 60 miles (100 km) in water.

No armor or weapons were included in its design as its role was cargo transport from ship to shore. Many vehicles were refitted prior to the Tarawa landing to hold two .50 Browning heavy machine guns forward, with the .30 guns aft. The vehicle was not armored and its thin steel hull offered virtually no protection, although prior to Tarawa some vehicles received 9 mm (0.35 in) of armor plating to the cab. Tracks performed well on sand, but not on tough surfaces. The rigid suspension threw tracks and roller bearings corroded in salt water. Proper maintenance of the new machine was often an issue, as few Marines were trained to work on it, and early models suffered frequent breakdowns. As LVT-1 vehicles experienced many breakdowns they were gradually phased out of operational use before 1945.

=== LVT-2 Water Buffalo, British designation Buffalo II ===
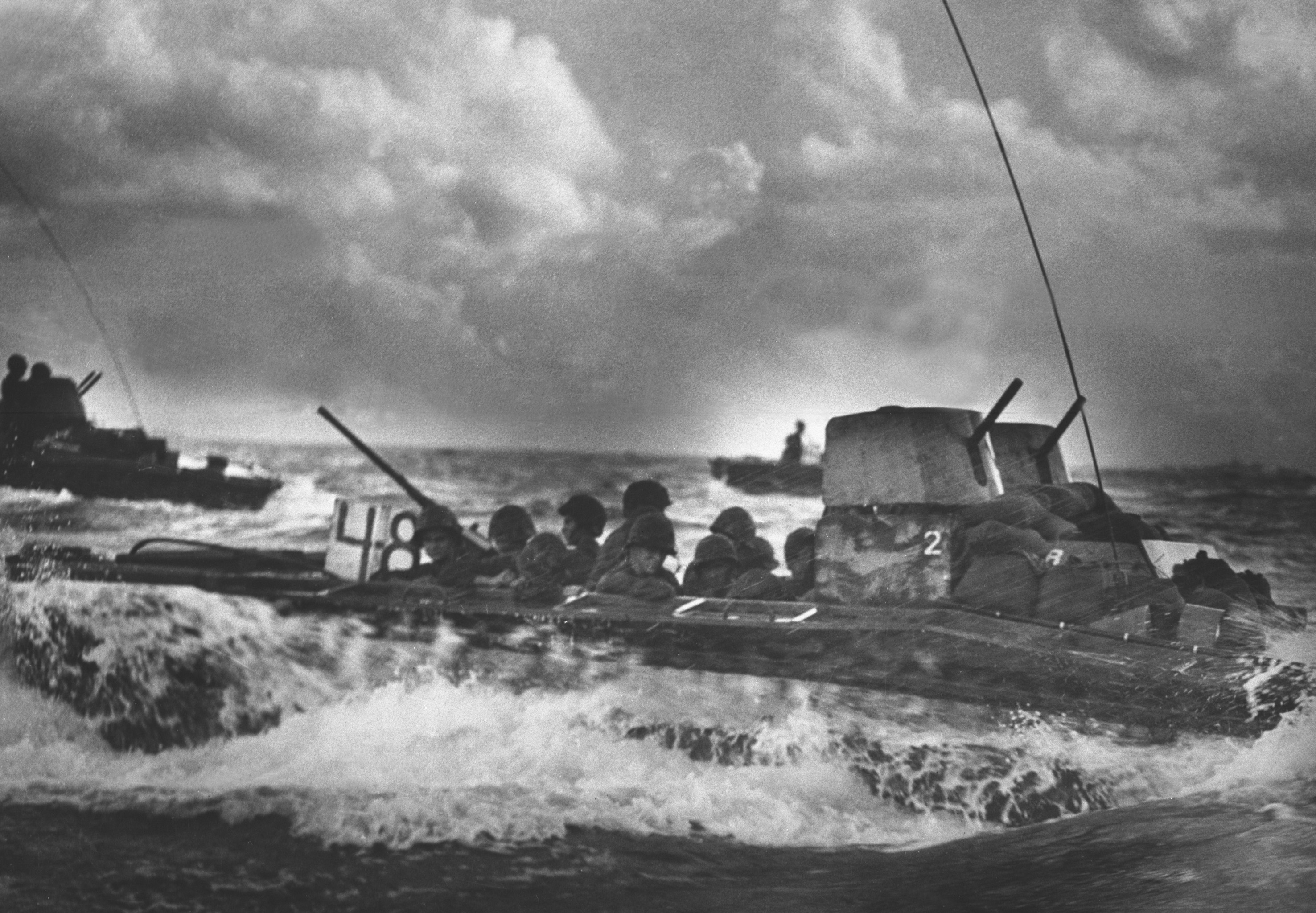
An LVT-2 Water Buffalo with Marines bound for the beaches of Tinian Island, 1944

This was an improved version of LVT-1. It featured a new powertrain (to save time and to simplify production it was the same Continental radial 7-cylinder engine as that in the M3A1 Stuart light tank) in the rear of the hull with a propshaft along the centreline to the transmission at the front, and torsilastic suspension. The aluminium track grousers were bolted on, making changes much easier since they wore out quickly on land and even more so on coral. Hard terrain performance was much better compared to the LVT-1. 2,962 units were produced for the US Navy, who then proceeded to transfer 1,507 to the US Army and 100 to the British Army. With a maximum speed of 20 mph (32 km/h) on land and 5.4 kn (10.0 km/h; 6.2 mph) on water) and an operational endurance of 150 miles on land (or 75 mi (121 km) on water) the LVT-2 could carry a normal payload of 6,500 lb (2,900 kg) or 24 fully equipped troops. Portable plating of "10 lb" rating on the sponson sides and hull rear and '20 lb' on the front and cab could be fitted.

Rails for mounting machine guns ran round the sides and rear of the cargo space and across the back of the cab.

LVT-2s participated in more campaigns than any other LVT variant, including Tarawa, Roi-Namur, Cape Gloucester, Northern Kwajalein, Saipan, Guam, Tinian, Peleliu, Iwo Jima, Okinawa and in some parts of Europe, such as the Rhine crossing of Operation Plunder.

=== LVT(A)-1 ===
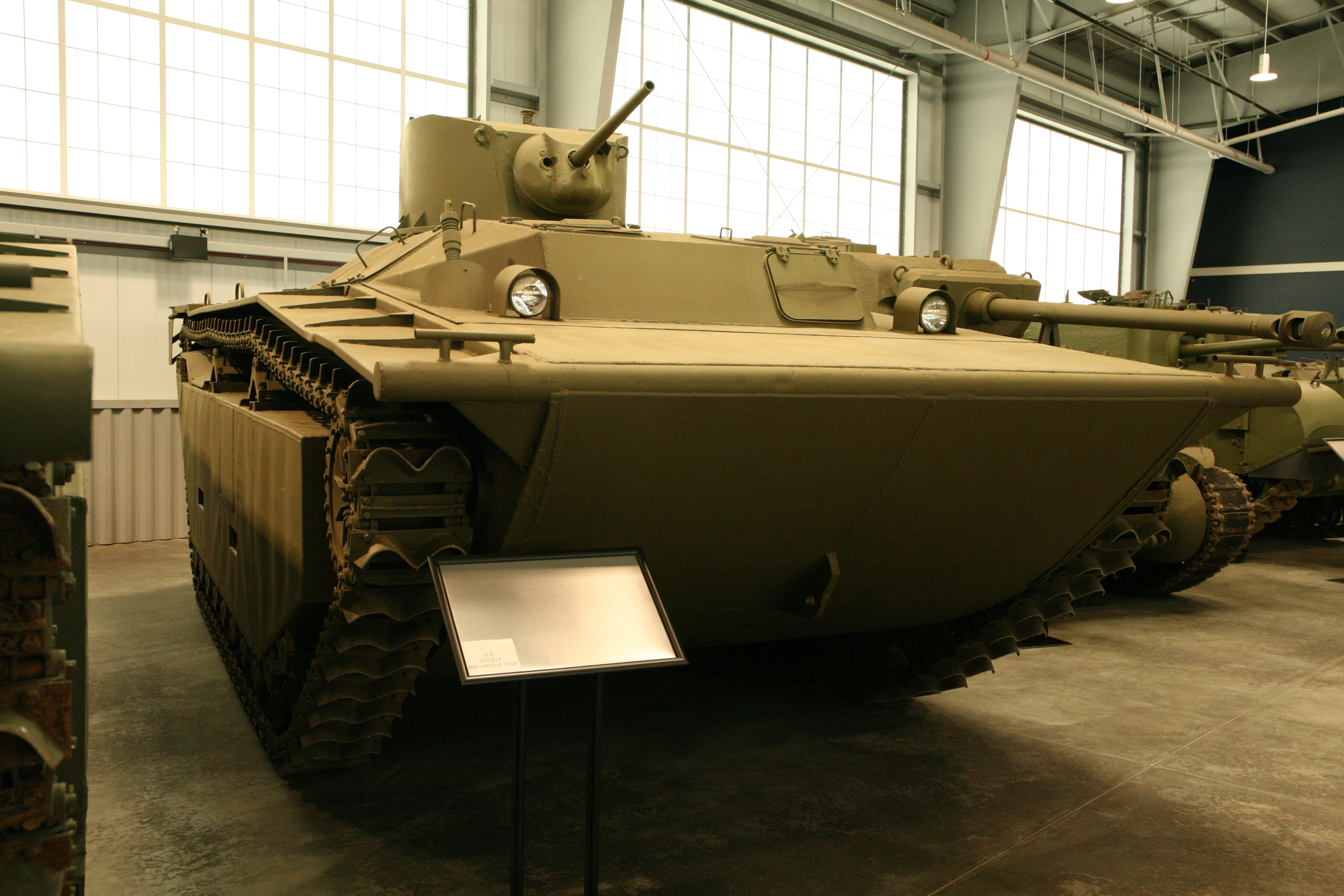
An LVT(A)-1 at the U.S. Army Armor & Cavalry Collection

The LVT(A) Mark 1 was the first infantry support LVT. With the first experience of Pacific amphibious operations it was clear heavier firepower than the usual .50 in guns was needed. Based on the LVT-2, A standing for 'armored', this fire support version had a hull with 12 mm (0.47 in) plate on the bow, cab and turret and 6 mm (0.24 in) of armor elsewhere. It was fitted with a turret nearly identical to that of the Light Tank M3, with a 37 mm Gun M6 in an M44 mount and coaxial 0,30-inch machine gun. Two more 0.30-inch machine guns on ring mounts on the rear deck behind the turret, 509 units were produced. It was powered by a 262 bhp (195 kW) air-cooled petrol engine. Due to the limitations imposed by the turret, it could carry only a limited payload of 1,000 lb (450 kg) of but maintained the same speed of 25 mph (40 km/h) on land and 5.4 kn (6.2 mph; 10.0 km/h) in water of the Mark 2, with an operational endurance of 125 mi (200 km) on land or 75 mi (120 km) in water.

These vehicles were intended to provide fire support to the assaulting Marines in the early stages of establishing a beachhead. It was common, however, for the LVT(A)s to commence firing whilst still in the water.

At Roi-Namur, the 24th Marines had support of LVT(A)-1s, but they could not close up enough to effectively support the troops from the beaches. Other LVT(A)-1s supported the 22nd Marines landing at Engebi. By mid-1944, all LVT(A)-1s had been replaced by much more capable 75mm gun armed LVT(A)-4s. This switch was primarily due to the LVT(A)-1 M6 gun lacking adequate bunker busting capabilities. The inability to neutralize bunkers on or near the beachheads was an inherent risk for Marines storming out of their landing craft.

=== LVT(A)-2 Water Buffalo ===
This was an armored version of the LVT-2, following the US Army's request for an armored variant of the LVT-2. Service in the South Pacific soon indicated more protection was needed. This version had the driver's cab protected by 0.5 in (13 mm) of armor plate, and the rest of the hull with 1/4 inch (6.4 mm) armor plate. By 1944, shields were added to protect the front gunners. Surprisingly the additional 2,750 lb (1,250 kg) of armor, added to the 24,250 lb (11,000 kg) weight of the unarmored LVT-2, had no impact on performance and only caused the craft to draw an additional 2 inches (51 mm) of water when afloat. The LVT(A)-2 had a capacity of 18 troops. 450 units produced.

=== LVT-4 Water Buffalo, British designation Buffalo IV ===
FMC modified an LVT-2 in August 1943 by moving the engine forward and adding a large ramp door in the rear, allowing troops to exit from the rear of the vehicle. Capacity went from 16 troops in the LVT-2 to 30, making earlier LVTs largely obsolete. This innovation also greatly facilitated the loading and unloading of cargo. Some vehicles received armor kits. It was by far the most numerous version of the LVT, with 8,348 units delivered; the US Army received 6,083, and the British Army 500. Many of the British LVT-4 were armed with a 20 mm Polsten cannon and two .30 in (7.62 mm) Browning machine guns. Removable 20 lb and 10 lb armor kits could be fitted.

Since no major changes were made to the engine and transmission of the LVT-2, the LVT-4 was completed much quicker than the LVT-3, with the first machines going into action at Saipan in June 1944.

=== Sea Serpent ===
The Sea Serpent was designed by the 79th Armoured Division for use by the British in the Far East. Its armament was two "Wasp" flamethrowers and a machine gun. These would have been used by the "flame battery" of the 34th Amphibian Support Regiment, Royal Marines in any assault on the Japanese mainland but the war ended before they were used.

=== LVT(A)-3 ===
Developed as a version of the LVT-4 with armor built in but never approved for production.

=== LVT-3 Bushmaster ===
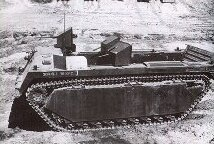
An LVT-3

Developed by the Borg Warner Corporation as their Model B in April 1943. To allow for rear loading, the engines were moved to the sponsons and a ramp installed in the rear, and the cargo area was slightly wider to provide room for a Jeep to be carried in the cargo hold. Some received armor kits. First used in combat in Okinawa in April 1945. The twin 148 brake horsepower (110 kW) Cadillac V-8 petrol engines were connected by driveshafts to the transmission (the same as the M5 light tank) in the front of the hull. It could carry a payload of 9,000 lb (4,100 kg) or 30 fully armed soldiers. (Note: ONI 255 gives 8,000 lb or 24 soldiers) 2,962 units produced, with many remaining in US service until 1955 when they were finally superseded by the LVTP-5. It performed with efficiency and greater reliability, as more maintenance time was generally available than during World War II. The LVT(3)C remained standard with the Marine Corps until the introduction of the first major post—war design, the LVT(P)5, in 1953. Overall weight of the craft was 26,600 lb (12.1 t), and its maximum speed was 17 miles per hour (27 km/h) on land or 6 miles per hour (9.7 km/h) on water, with an operational range of 150 miles (240 km) on land or 75 miles (121 km) on water.

=== LVT(A)-4 ===
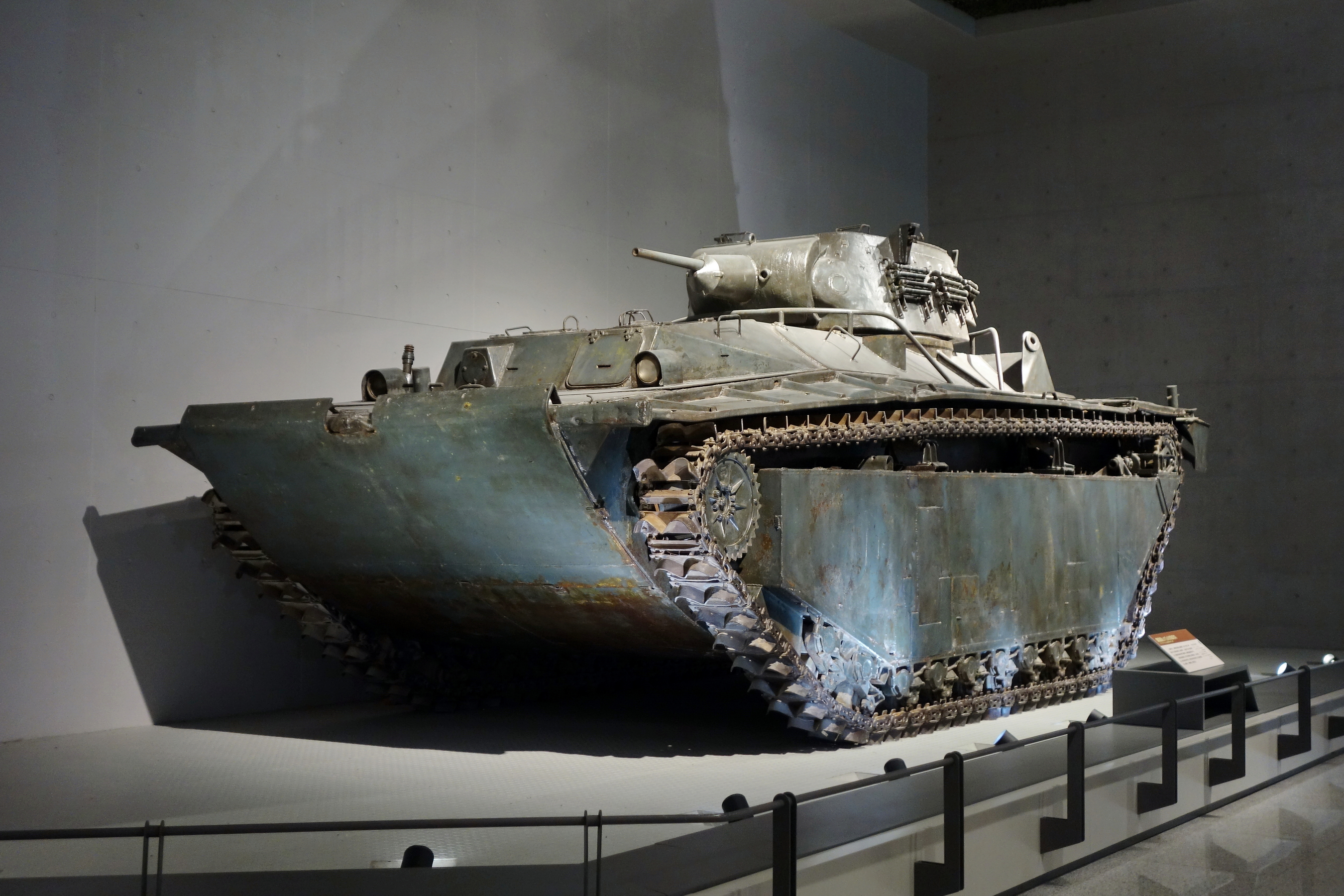
Preserved Chinese LVT(A)-4 37mm retrofit

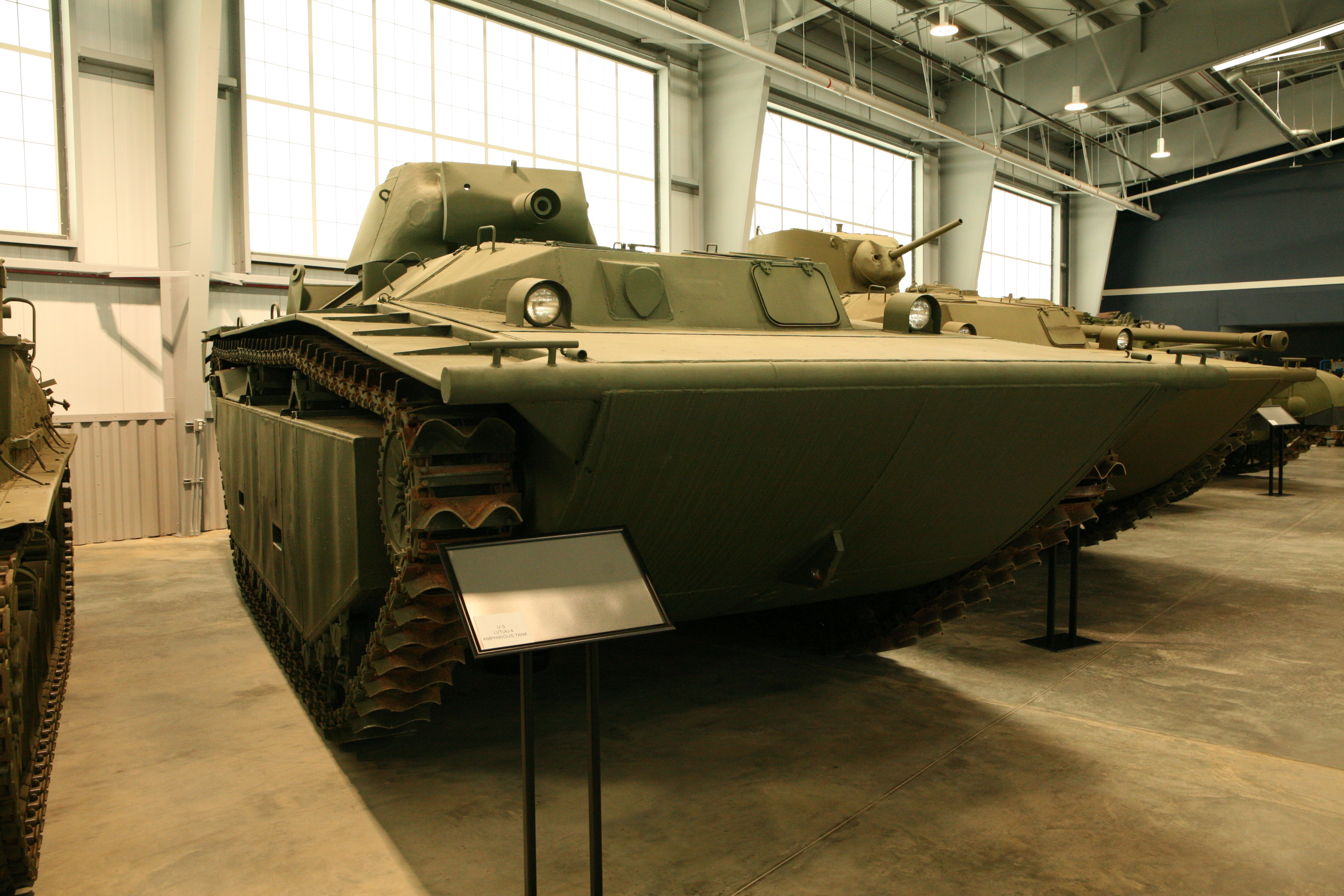
LTV(A)-4 at the U.S. Army Armor & Cavalry Collection

To address the inadequate fire support of the 37 mm armed LVT (A)-1, an up-gunned version of the vehicle was introduced in March 1944. It included a larger turret taken from the Howitzer motor carriage M8 armed with the 75 mm howitzer. In some cases the main armament was replaced with the Canadian Ronson flamethrower. In early production vehicles, a .50-caliber machine gun was mounted on top of the vehicle turret. However, combat experience demonstrated whoever operated the gun was exposed to enemy fire. To fix this issue, late production vehicles replaced the .50-caliber machine gun with two pintle mounted .30-caliber machine guns on either side of the turret and one in the bow. 1,890 units produced, with 1,307 were transferred to the US Army and 50 to the British Army. The hull was armoured as the Mark 1 but the open-topped M8 turret was up to 1-inch thick.

The Chinese PLA captured several from Nationalist forces during the Civil War and placed them in service, eventually modifying some by replacing the 75 mm howitzer with the 37 mm M6 tank gun and others with the ZiS-2 57 mm anti-tank gun, complete with shield, the conversion also necessitating the removal of the original mantlet.

=== LVT(A)-5 ===
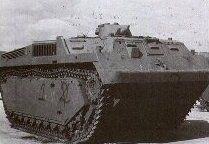
LVT-3C

Introduced in 1945, the LVT(A)-5 was a LVT(A)-4 with a powered turret and a gyrostabilizer for the howitzer. Some were upgraded in the late 1940s by modifying the armor configuration. 269 units produced.

=== LVT-3C ===
Modified LVT-3. An armored roof was fitted and the bow was extended to improve buoyancy. Armament included a .30 inch machine gun in a turret and another in a ball mount in the bow. 1,200 LVT-3s were converted.

=== Amphibian, tracked, 4-ton General Service ("Neptune") ===
A British vehicle based on the LVT-4, known as the Neptune, was built by Nuffield. Only a handful of the 2,000 ordered were completed. The Sealion was a recovery version, and the Turtle a workshop version.

== Preservation ==
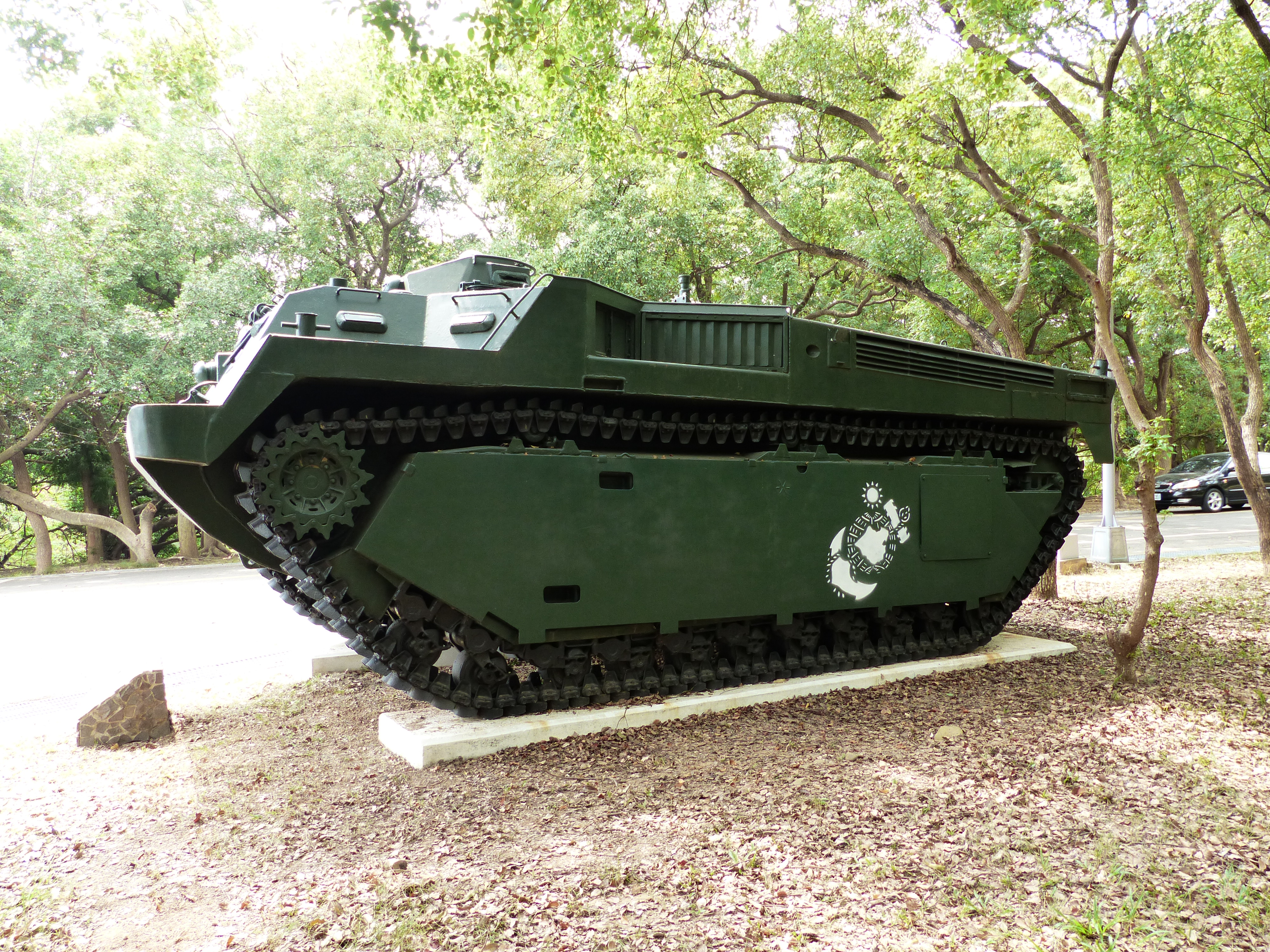
LVT-3C of Taiwan's Republic of China Marine Corps

=== China ===
At least one LVT(A)-1 or LVT(A)-4 retrofitted(according to photograph) is preserved in Military Museum Beijing according to above photograph.

=== France ===
An LVT-2 is preserved at the Utah Beach Landing Museum in Normandy. This LVT-2 was used to carry cargo and troops ashore subsequent to the D-Day landings.

=== The Netherlands ===
An LVT-4 is preserved at the Bevrijdingsmuseum Zeeland at Nieuwdorp in Zeeland.

In the Netherlands, the Buffalo was deployed during the Battle of the Scheldt in 1944, among other times. British troops used these amphibious vehicles for landings and troop transport in the difficult-to-access area of the Scheldt Delta, including during operations in West Zeelandic Flanders, South Beveland, and during the landings on Walcheren. The Buffalo played an important role in bridging waterways and flooded areas, thereby making a significant contribution to Allied operations in Zeeland.

=== Philippines ===
Amphibious Vehicle, Tracked (LVT) is Preserved at the Philippine Military Academy, Fort Del Pilar, Baguio City Philippines .

=== United Kingdom ===
An LVT-4 is preserved at the Tank Museum at Bovington in Dorset.

In 1947, a Buffalo LVT being used in flood defense work in Crowland, Lincolnshire, UK, was swept away and buried. In 2021, it was excavated and retrieved, and volunteers are planning to preserve and restore it to running order. In June 2022 it was put on display in Thorney, Cambridgeshire, as part of the commemoration of the 75th anniversary of the floods. A second vehicle may also be recovered from the site.

=== United States of America ===
The American Heritage Museum in Stow, Massachusetts has a LVT(A)-4 on public display.

== See also ==
- WWII/Korea LVT Museum
- Landwasserschlepper
- DUKW
- Terrapin (amphibious vehicle)
- 2nd Assault Amphibian Battalion
- Type 2 Ka-Mi
- M76 Otter
- M116 Husky
