= M116 =

M116 or M-116 may refer to:

- M116 (New York City bus), a New York City Bus route in Manhattan
- M-116 (Michigan highway), a state highway
- M116 howitzer, United States military howitzer
- M116 Husky, a tracked amphibious cargo carrier/marginal terrain vehicle in service with the United States Marine Corps
- Mercedes-Benz M116 engine, an automobile engine
