= List of museums in Guam =

This is a list of museums in Guam.

== Museums in Guam ==
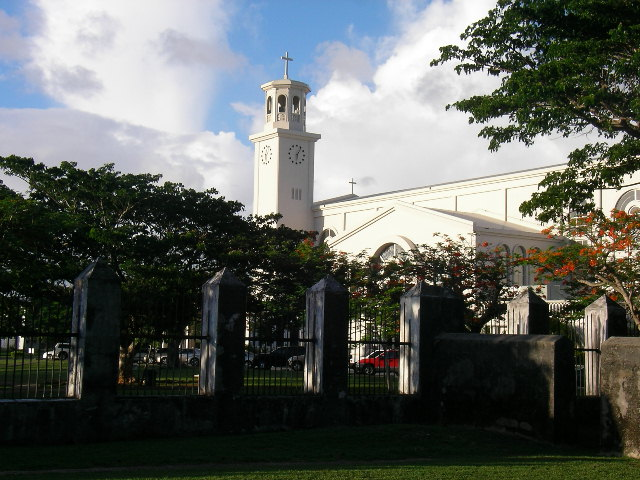
National Museum of the Dulce Nombre de Maria, Guam

- National Museum of the Dulce Nombre de Maria
- Pacific War Museum
- War in the Pacific National Historical Park

== See also ==
- List of museums
