= M29 Weasel =

American light tracked vehicle

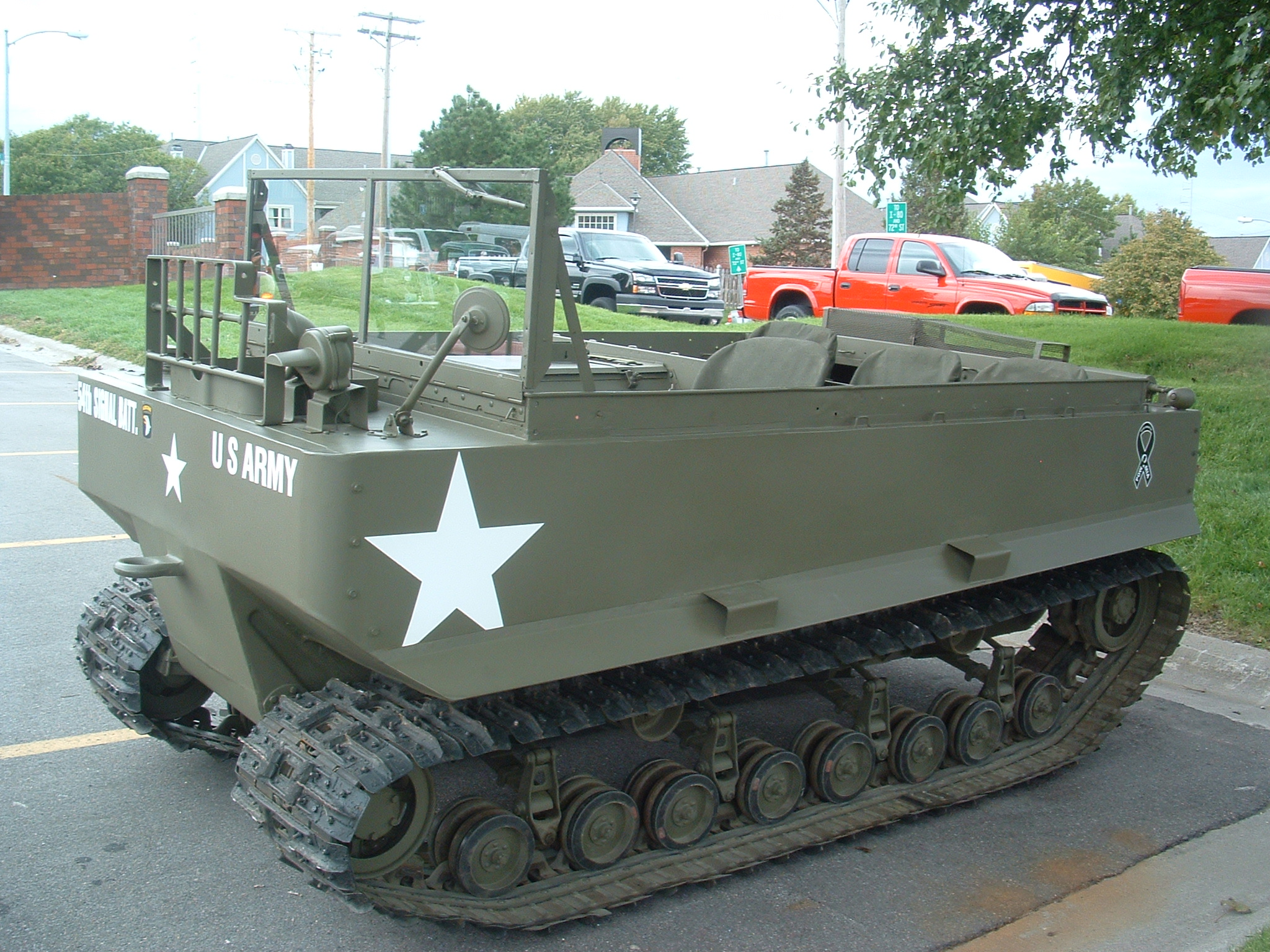
- Type: Tracked vehicle
- Place of origin: United States

Production history
- Produced: September 1943 – August 1945
- No. built: 4,476 M29; 10,647 M29C
- Variants: M29, M29C

Specifications
- Mass: 3,800 lb (1,700 kg) dry
- Length: 10 ft 6 in (3.20 m)
- Width: 5 ft (1.5 m) later 5 ft 6 in (1.68 m)
- Height: 4 ft 3 in (1.30 m); 5 ft 11 in (1.80 m) to top of windscreen
- Crew: 4
- Engine: Studebaker Model 6-170 Champion 6-cylinder 70 hp (52 kW)
- Suspension: Tracked
- Operational range: 165 mi (266 km)
- Maximum speed: 36 mph (58 km/h)

The M29 Weasel is a World War II tracked vehicle designed for operation in snow. Built by Studebaker, Weasels were also used in sandy, muddy, and desert terrains, including towing loads over terrain wheeled vehicles could not negotiate as in the U.S. Marine invasions of Iwo Jima and Okinawa.

Standard M29s were semi-amphibious, but with a very low freeboard. An M29C Water Weasel version was produced with fore and aft buoyancy cells and twin rudders. Capable of operating in inland waterways, it however also saw limited action in surf conditions in the Pacific Theatre and during the landings on Walcheren in Europe.

The Weasel was designed by British inventor Geoffrey Pyke to support Project Plough, aimed at attacking Axis forces in Norway. The initial version, T15 (later M28), featured a rear engine, front wheel drive system, 15-inch Kégresse-style tracks, and a two-passenger capacity. The later M29 version had a front engine, rear wheel drive system, 20-inch tracks, larger passenger/load capacity, and improved amphibious capabilities. The M29C Water Weasel was more amphibious with buoyancy cells and twin rudders but limited to inland waterway conditions. The bogie wheel arrangement differs between M28 and M29 versions.

== Design and development ==
The idea for the Weasel came from the work of British inventor Geoffrey Pyke, in support of his proposal to attack Axis forces and industrial installations in German-occupied Norway. Pyke's plan to hamper the German nuclear weapons program became Project Plough, for which he proposed a fast, light mechanized vehicle that would transport small groups of commando troops of the 1st Special Service Force across snow. It would need to be air transportable, capable of being dropped by parachute, and carry passengers, arms, explosives and supplies.

The first 2,103 vehicles were designated T15, and later standardized as the M28 Cargo Carrier. The T15/M28 had 15 in (380 mm) Kégresse-style "rubber-band" tracks. The later version designated M29 had 20 in (510 mm) tracks of the same format. Some of the most noticeable differences were that the T15/M28 had a rear engine, front wheel drive system, a different arrangement of only four bogie wheels per side. The hull itself was also designed slightly different with only a two-passenger capacity. In contrast, the M29 was a front engine, rear wheel drive vehicle with a different bogie wheel arrangement and a modified hull to accommodate a larger passenger/load capacity. One of the most obvious differences between the M28 and M29 is that the M29's idler wheel, located at the front of the vehicle, is lower than the drive sprocket at the rear, making the M29 appear to be driving backwards.

The M29 was somewhat amphibious, but with a very low freeboard, while the M29C Water Weasel was the more amphibious version, with buoyancy cells in the bow and stern and twin rudders. Despite this, M29C still could not operate in other than inland waterway conditions; its use in surf or rough water was very limited, but it did see action in the Pacific theater.

== Operational use ==
=== U.S. Army ===
The Norwegian mission was cancelled and therefore the Weasel was never used for its original purpose. However, as it was amphibious and could cross terrain too soft for most other vehicles, it was used widely in both Italy and on the Western Front. In active service in Europe, Weasels were used to supply frontline troops over difficult ground when wheeled vehicles were immobilized. It went ashore on Normandy, it was with the U.S. Army during the breakthrough at St. Lo, the Battle of the Bulge and in the mud of the Roer and the Rhine. It was also used in Italy to take on the mountainous terrain in the Italian Campaign. The M29 was primarily a cargo carrier, but was also used as a command vehicle, radio platform, and signal line layer. U.S. soldiers soon realized the Weasel could also be used as an all-terrain ambulance, as it could get to places not even Jeeps could. Another use was for crossing minefields, as its ground pressure was often too low to set off anti-tank mines.

The reliability of the vehicle when used in the European summer and during long trips on hard roads was the subject of consternation among Allied troops to whom they were assigned. The commander of the 87th Chemical Mortar Battalion left the note below during their advances towards La Ferté Macé on D-Day+69:

All companies are having a great deal of trouble with the M-29 Cargo Carriers on long movements such as the ones Companies C and D have made in the past several days. The Cargo Carriers have been overheating and, in several cases, the water has completely boiled out of the radiators. These vehicles were made to operate in arctic temperatures. The motor becomes so hot that the oil in the transmission literally boils and boils out. Plates are coming off the tracks and the cables that hold the tracks together break on these long movements. All in all, the efficiency and mobility of this battalion is greatly reduced by our being required to operate with such a vehicle, not only because it is inefficient but because it was never intended to operate in this climate or on hard and paved roads.

— 87th Chemical Mortar Battalion Unit History (14th August, 1944)

After the war, many surplus M29s were sold to allied countries such as Norway, Sweden, and France. The M29 and M29C also served in the Korean War, supplementing 1/4 ton 4x4 cargo vehicles in rough conditions. They served in Arctic and cold weather operations until finally retired by the U.S. in 1958. Large numbers of retired Weasels were sold off in the 1950s to civilians and municipal organizations. For example, 25 Weasels were loaned for the VIII Olympic Winter Games in 1960.

=== U.S. Marine Corps ===
In November 1944, USMC distributed M29s to the 3d, 4th, and 5th Marine Divisions. They proved invaluable with its first appearance in combat on Iwo Jima. It also saw use on Okinawa.

The USMC used only the non-amphibious version, but it was capable of hauling a half-ton load through sand and mud. Besides this they pulled trailers and artillery pieces over the terrain that wheeled vehicles could not negotiate.

=== French Army ===
During the First Indochina War, the 1st Foreign Cavalry Regiment was in charge of fighting Viet Minh guerrillas in the Mekong Delta area. Its units, 1st and 2nd Escadrons, received M29C Weasels from the 13th Demi-Brigade of Foreign Legion in 1947. Initially they were unsuccessful as they were crewed by inexperienced men, used wrong tactics and were deployed without infantry support. Their losses were heavy. The 1er régiment de chasseurs à cheval also deployed 1 Escadron of M29s from 1949 to 1953.

French soldiers learned fast after several months of fighting, but the real deployment of full forces was possible only when they received LVT-4s and LVT(A)-4s in 1950. Now they could move stronger infantry units around. In September 1951 1er Groupement Autonome was established, consisting of two escadrons of Weasels (33 each), three escadrons of LVT-4 (11 each) and one fire support platoon of 6 LVT(A)-4. French Weasels, known as Crabes were heavily armed with Châtellerault M1924/29, Bren or Browning M1919 machine guns, 57mm M18A1 recoilless guns and even 60mm mortars.

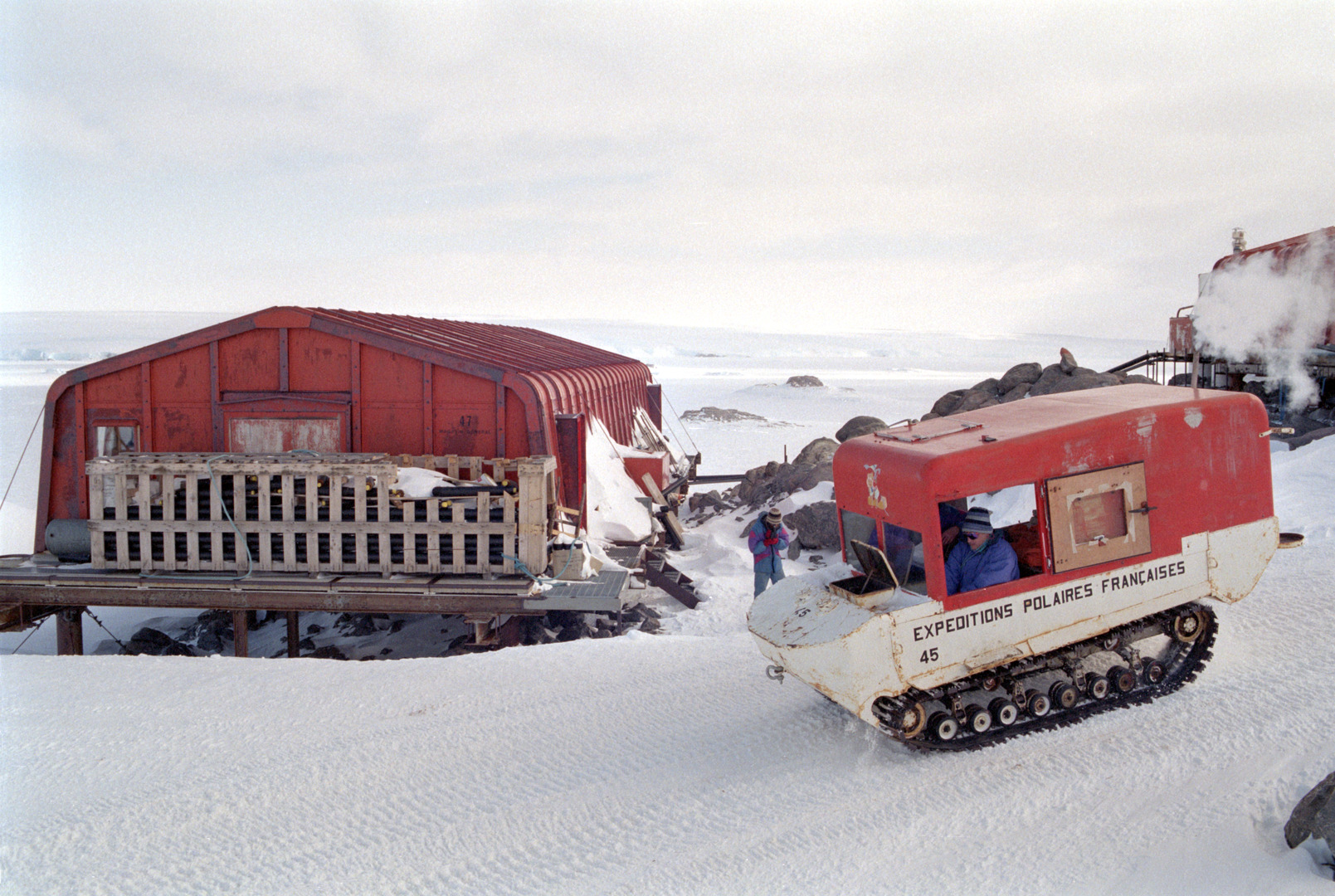
One of the last weasels in use at Dumont d'Urville Station in Antarctica, 1993

French mountain troops and French Gendarmerie used M29s until 1970.

After the Indochina war, the remaining weasels were given to the French Polar Expeditions and used at the Antarctic station of Dumont d'Urville until 1993.

=== British Army ===
Amphibious M29 Weasels of 4th Special Service Brigade were used by British commando troops in the Walcheren operation, supplementing LVT Buffalos. The 79th Armoured Division used also non-amphibious variant of the Weasel, modified for clearing anti-personnel devices. The Lovat Scouts used the amphibious Weasel during their time in Jasper, Alberta, where they were being trained in advanced winter and mountain warfare tactics, having already carried out the basic winter and mountain combat training in the Scottish Highlands and North Wales.

Non-amphibious Weasels were also used by British Infantry Divisions fighting in the Saar-Moselle Triangle, as they were often the only means of getting supplies forward.

After the war they were kept in service for a few years.

=== Canadian Army ===
The first use of the T15 Cargo Carrier, known to the Canadian Army as the "Snow-jeep", was in Operation Cottage in 1943 during the Aleutian Islands Campaign. Fifty T-15 Cargo Carriers were received at Nanaimo, BC in June 1943 for use in the Aleutians by the 13th Canadian Infantry Brigade. The T15's were some of the earliest shipments of supplies from the United States to replace Canadian Motorised Transport to be used in the joint operations. The United States provided all military transport so to avoid having to set up a Canadian maintenance system and to provide commonality between the two armies.

M29 Weasel was used extensively by Canadian forces from the fall of 1944 during the Battle of the Scheldt to clear the marshy Scheldt estuary, the flooded approaches to the Port of Antwerp. Later M29s supported Canadian advance through flooded areas in Netherlands and Germany.

After the war, they were kept in service for use in the Arctic.

== Variants ==
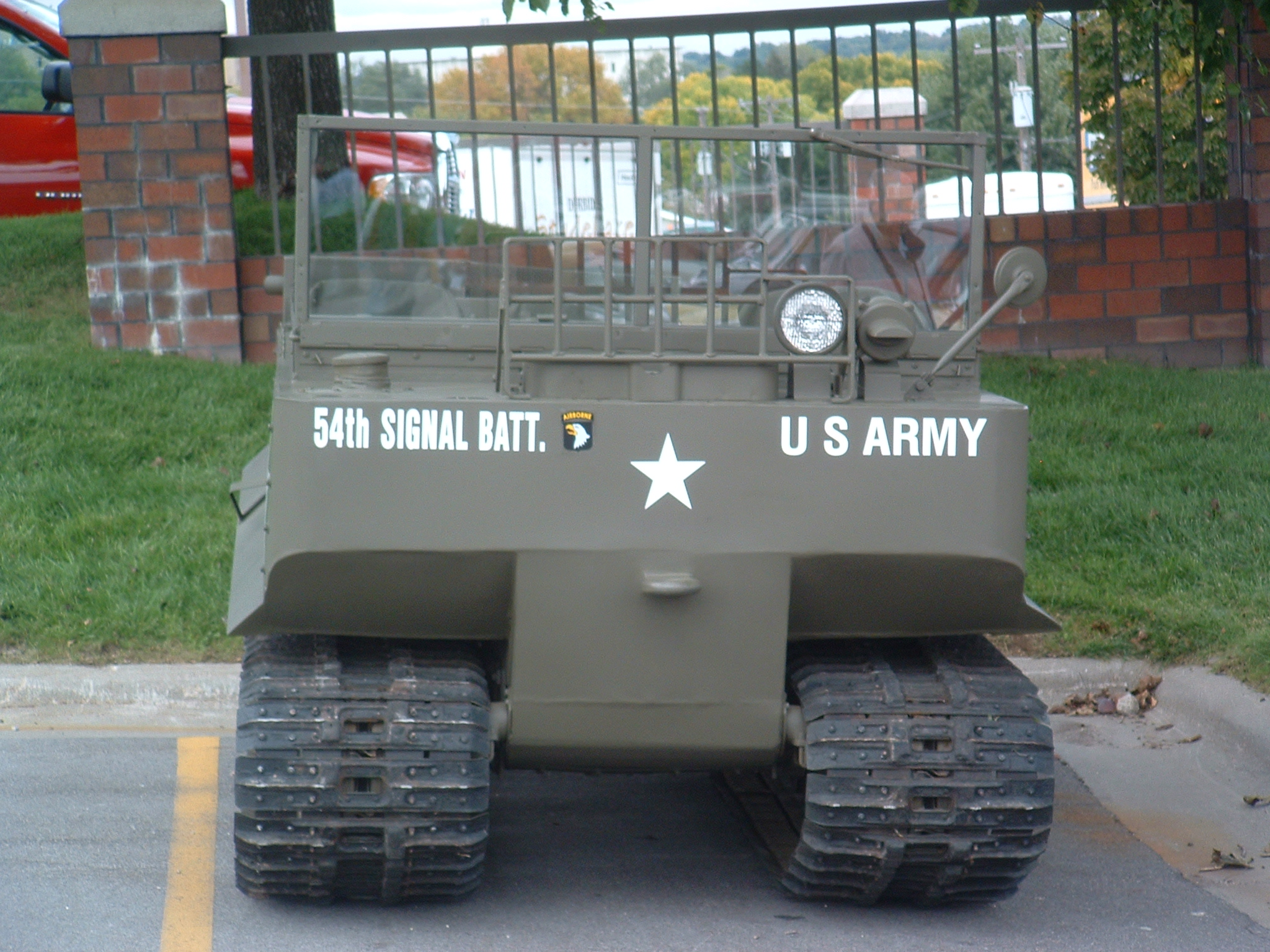
M29 Weasel front view

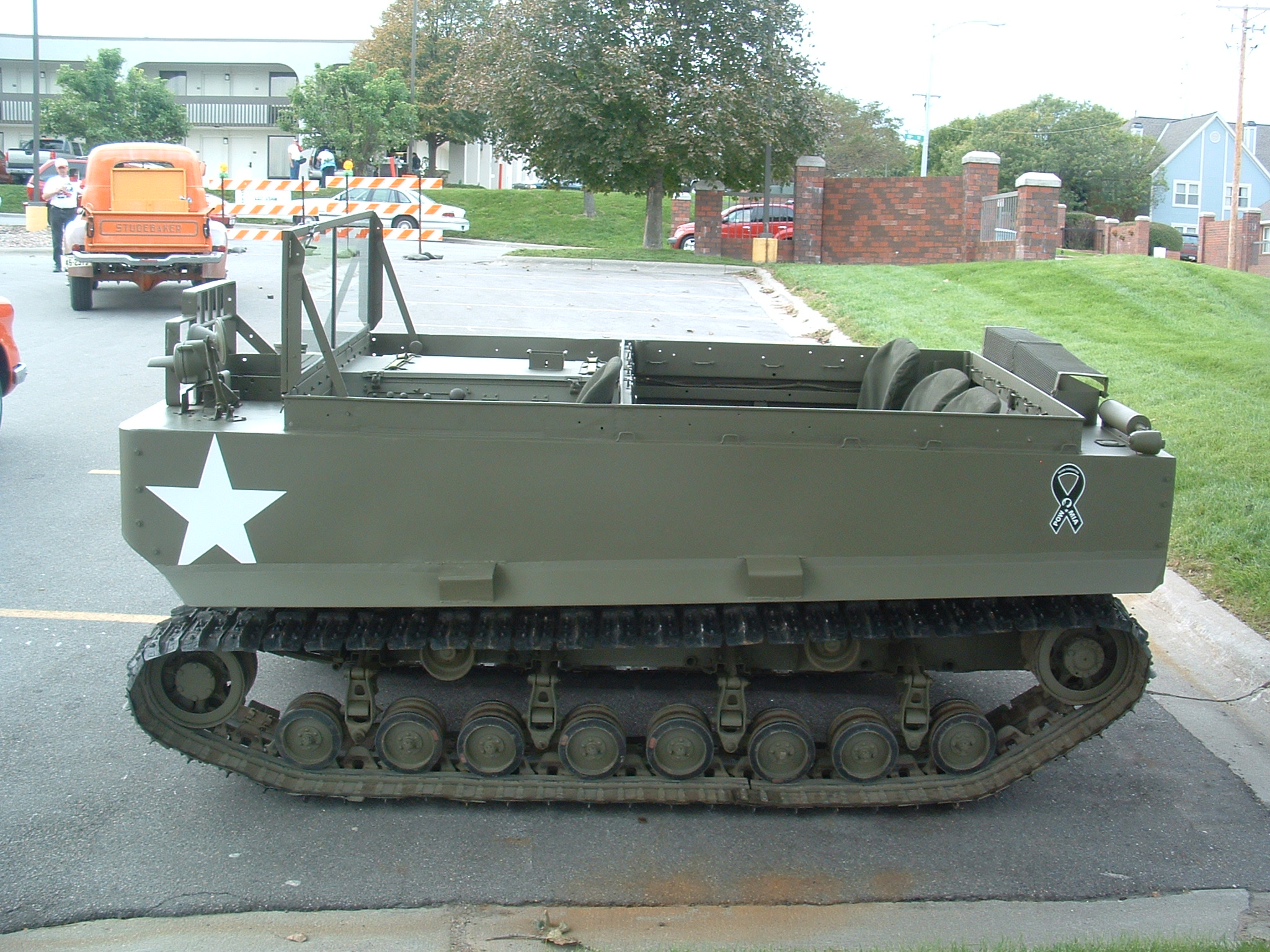
M29 Weasel side view

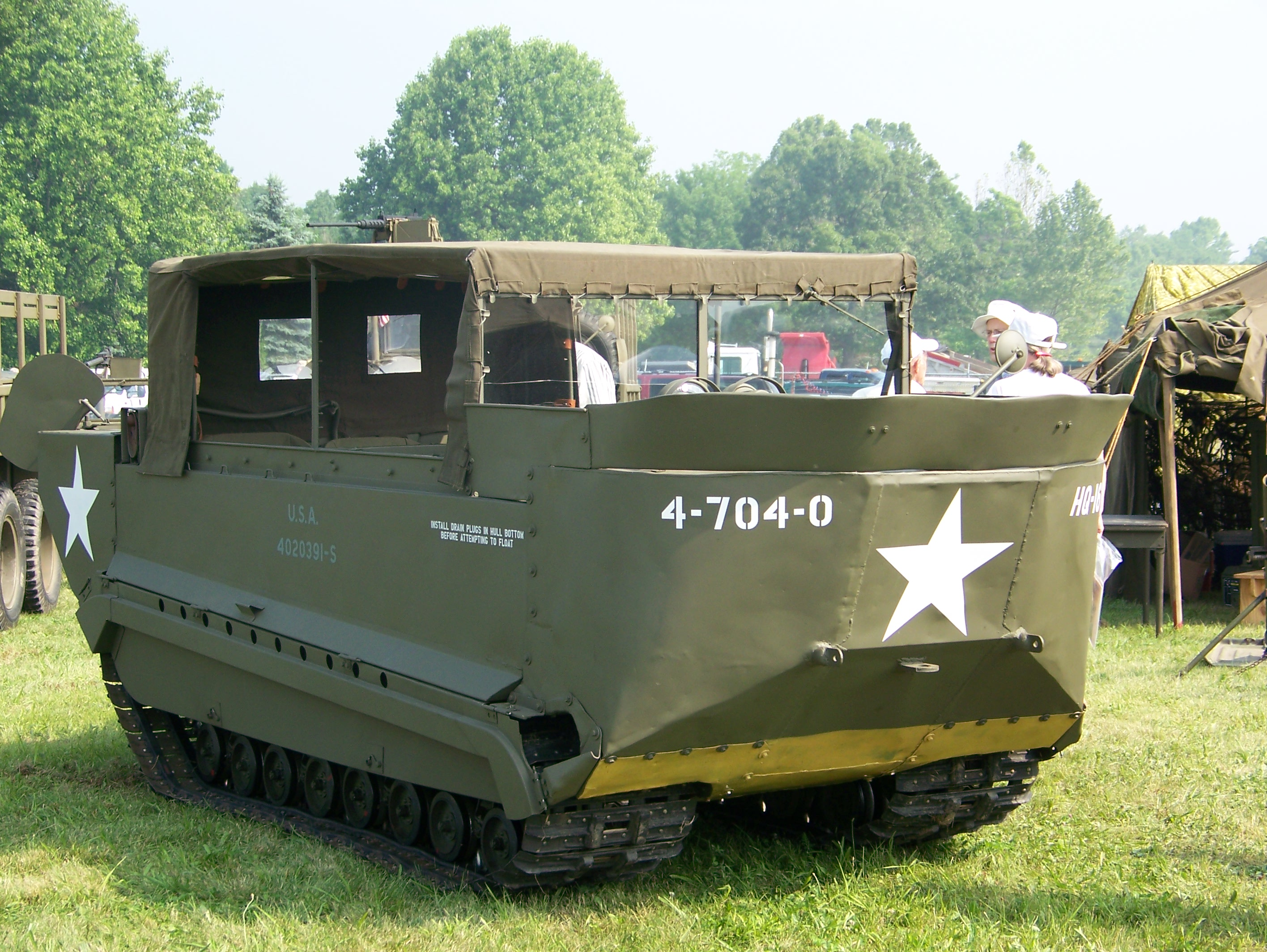
M29C Water Weasel

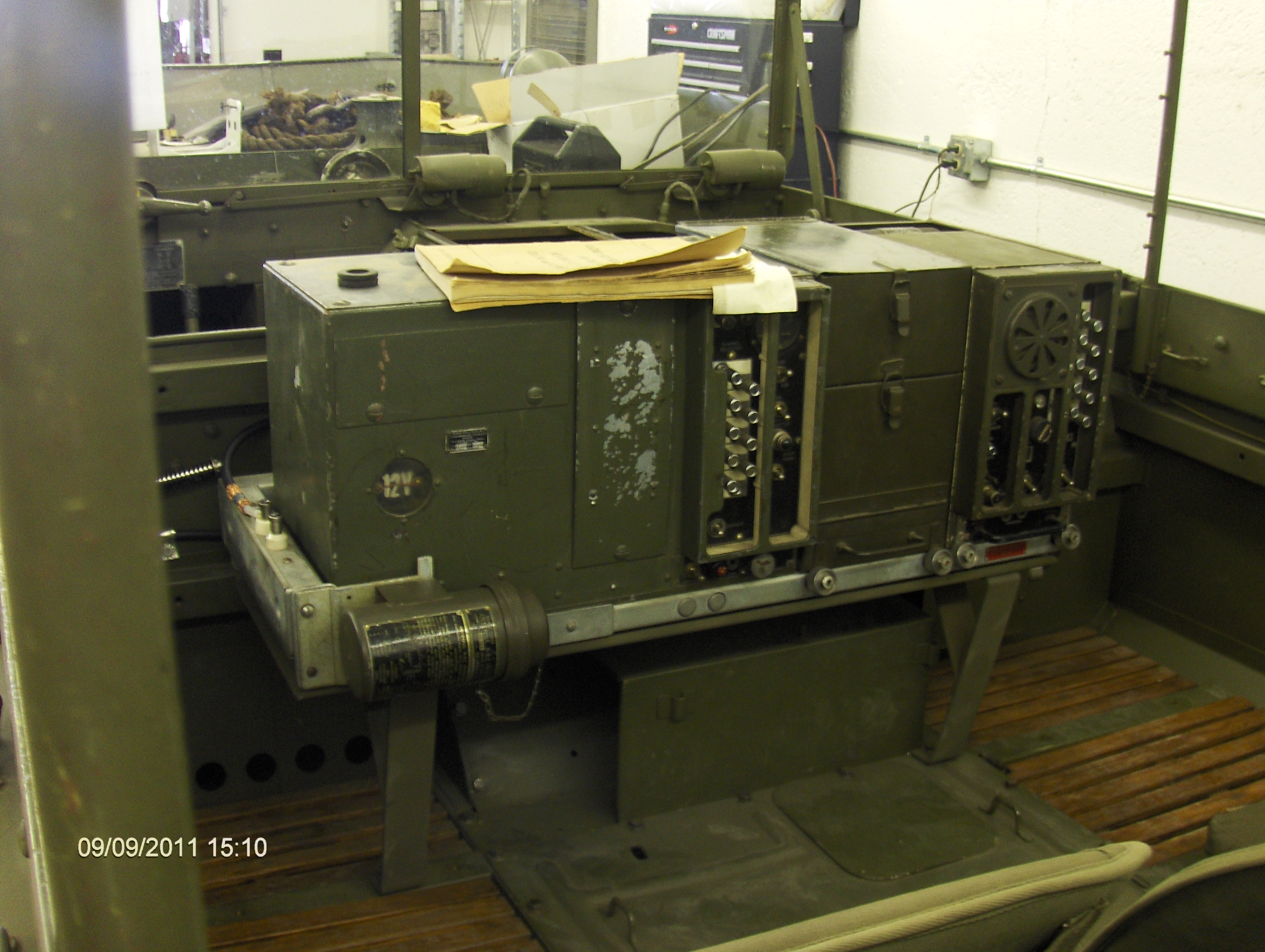
SCR-508 radio mounted in Weasel

- T-15 prototype
- M28 (G154)
- M29 (T24) without float tanks (G179)
- M29C with float tanks
- M29C Type A: with center-mounted 75 mm M20 recoilless rifle
- M29C Type B: with (T106) rear-mounted 75 mm recoilless rifle
- M29C Type C: with center-mounted 37 mm Gun M3
- M29C Wasp: fitted with the same Canadian flamethrower as used on Universal Carriers

== Specification ==
General

- Weight (fighting): 4,451 lb (2,019 kg)
- Shipping dimensions:
  - Uncrated; 340 cu ft (9.6 m^{3}); 57.7 sq ft (5.36 m^{2})
- Ground clearance: 11 in (280 mm)
- Ground pressure: 1.9 psi (13 kPa)
- Pintle height (loaded): 27.125 in (0.6890 m)
- Electrical system: (volts) 12
- Brakes: Mechanical – external contracting in differential
- Transmission: Speeds: 3
- Transfer case: Speeds: 2

The engine was a Studebaker Model 6-170 Champion, a 6-cylinder 169.6 cu in (2,779 cc) cubic inch 4-stroke engine running on 72 octane gasoline delivering 70 bhp at 3,600 rpm. Fuel capacity was 35 US gal (130 L). Under average conditions (typically 5 miles per gallon), it could range 165 mi (266 km).

Performance

Maximum gradability:	100%
Turning radius:	12 ft (3.7 m)
Fording depth:	Will Float (M29C)
Maximum width of ditch vehicle will cross:	36 in (91 cm)
Maximum vertical obstacle vehicle will climb:	24 in (61 cm)
Maximum allowable speed:	36 mph (58 km/h)
Maximum allowable towed load:	3,800 lb (1,700 kg)

== Gallery ==
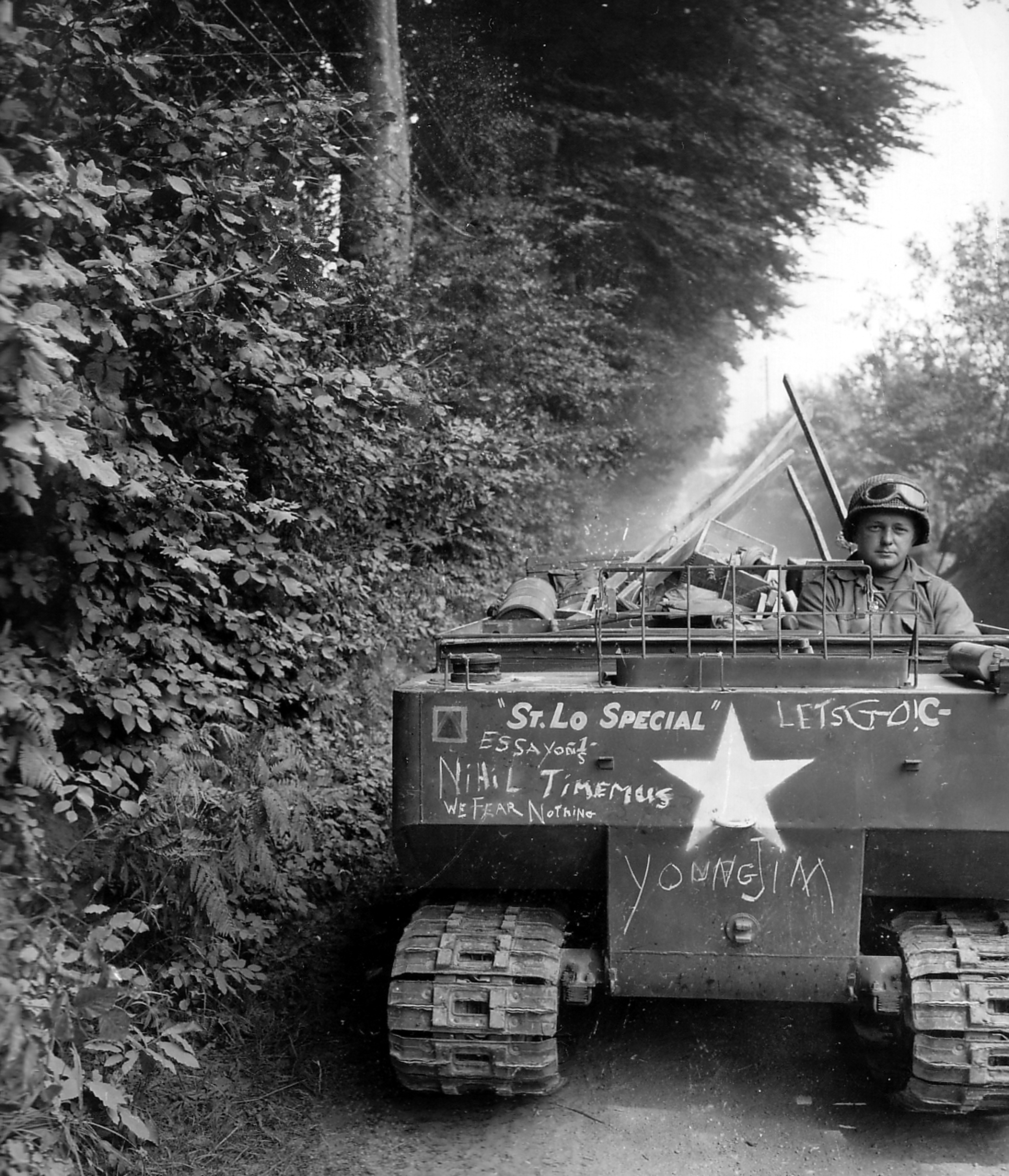
M29 Weasel in France in World War II

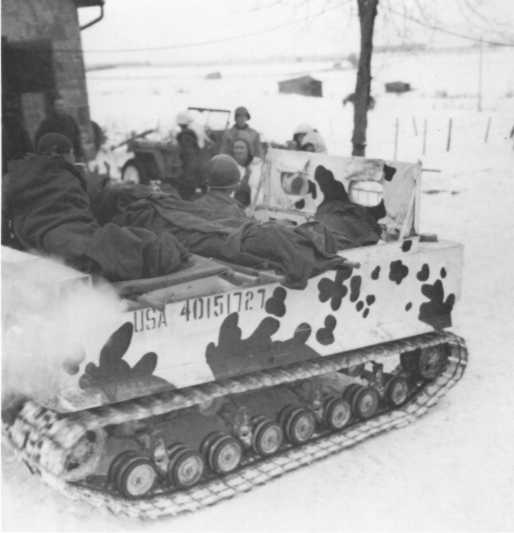
M29 Weasel in Winter 1944

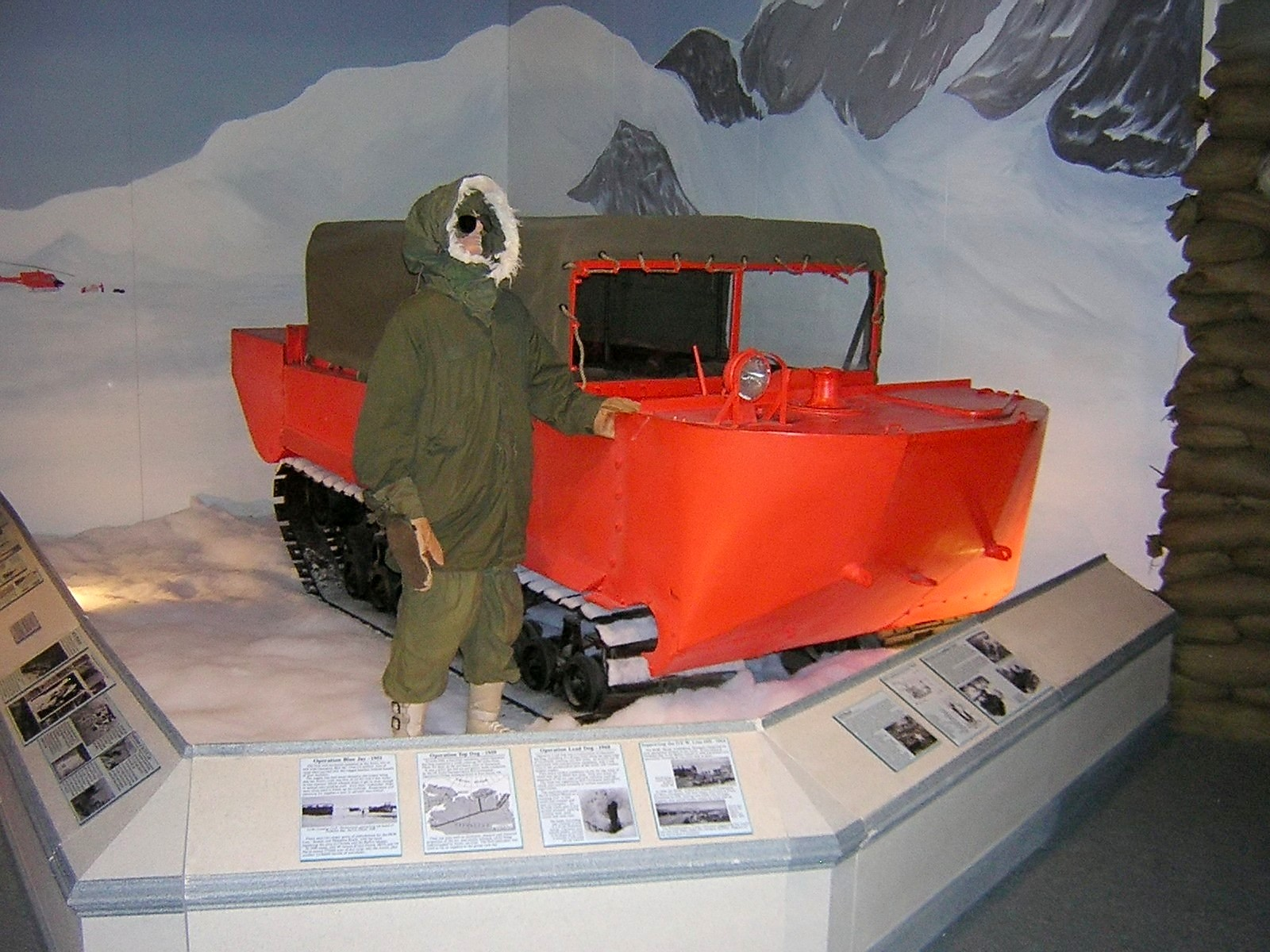
M29C Weasel in Arctic finish in a display at the U.S. Army Transportation Museum

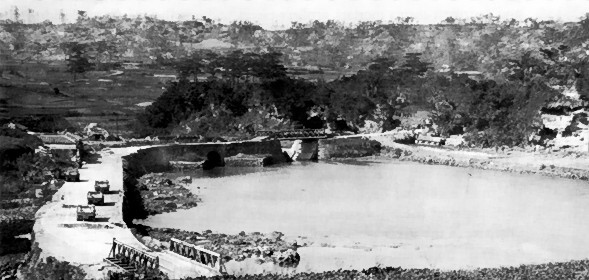
M29 Weasel knocked out in combat in Okinawa

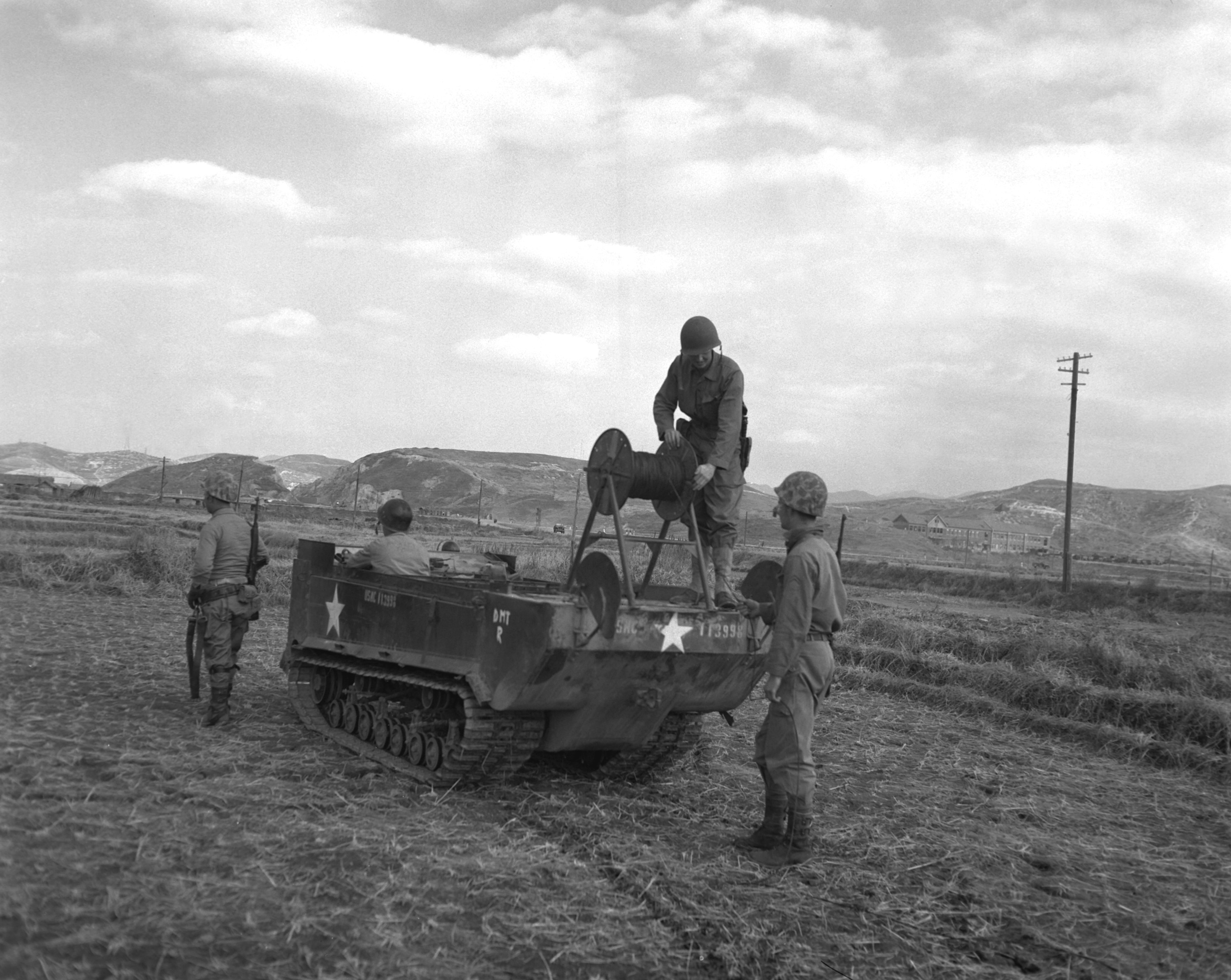
M29 Weasel of First Marine Division communication section in Korean war

== See also ==
- G-numbers
- M-numbers
- C2P tractor – (Poland)
- Kettenkrad – (Nazi Germany)
- Komsomolets armored tractor – (Soviet Union)
- M7 snow tractor – (United States)
- M76 Otter – (United States)
- Raupenschlepper Ost – (Nazi Germany)
- Universal Carrier – (United Kingdom)
- Vostok traverse
