= 11th Motor Transport Battalion =

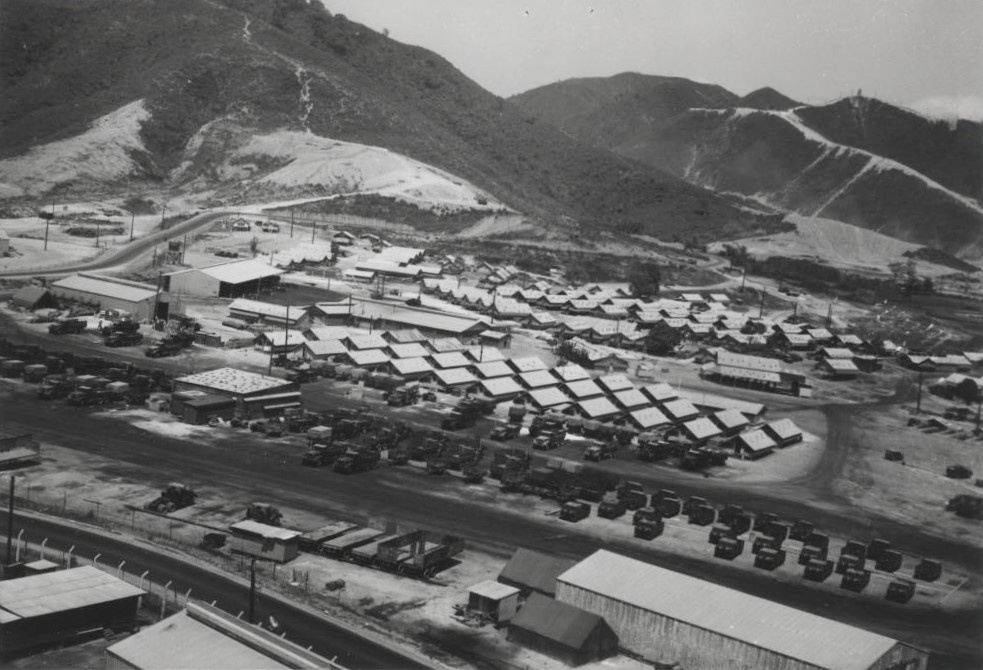
- 11th Motor Transport Battalion compound, Danang, 1969
- Active: 1966-1971
- Country: United States
- Allegiance: United States of America
- Branch: United States Marine Corps
- Type: Logistics
- Nickname(s): The Rolling 11th
- Engagements: Vietnam War

The 11th Motor Transport Battalion (11th MTB) was a logistics unit of the United States Marine Corps active from 1966 to 1971.

== History ==
On 7 December 1966 most of the battalion embarked at San Diego aboard the USS General LeRoy Eltinge for South Vietnam, via Naha, Okinawa. An advance party arrived by air at Danang Air Base on 17 December. The battalion arrived into Danang Harbor on 29 December, offloaded onto the Red Beach Base Area and by nightfall had established its compound. The battalion was placed under the operational control of the 1st Marine Division.

On 18 January 1967, after all its heavy equipment had been brought ashore, the battalion began operations in support of 1st Division units. On 1 July 1967 a battalion MRC-109 radio jeep hit a mine killing two Marines. On 8 July a battalion M54 truck hit a mine while delivering supplies to the 2nd Battalion 5th Marines on Hill 63 resulting in one Marine killed.

On 5 April 1968 a convoy to Phu Bai Combat Base was hit by four command detonated mines. An M54 security truck was damaged and a Marine from K Company, 3rd Battalion, 5th Marines was killed. On 14 July 1968 a battalion M54 detonated a mine and received small arms fire killing the driver. On 20 November while supporting Operation Meade River an M54 hit a mine killing one Marine.

On the morning of 23 February 1969 six 140mm rockets hit the battalion compound and later that evening, small arms and sniper fire was received and enemy probes of the perimeter occurred. A Company B Marine was killed by small arms fire while recapturing an observation post. On 6 March 1969 an M54A2C detonated a mine killing one Marine. In April 1969 the battalion put its first M116E1 Huskies into service. On 12 August 1969 the battalion was attacked by an enemy force using mortars and small arms, a sweep of the perimeter captured on People's Army of Vietnam (PAVN) soldier and two Rocket-propelled grenades (RPG). On 20 August an M116 was hit by an RPG killing the driver. On 6 September 1969 a battalion ambush patrol killed three PAVN and captured one AK-47, one K-50M and an RPG launcher. On 29 October battalion personnel participated in a demonstration of the XM174 grenade launcher firing from the M733 and 4A2C vehicles. This was provided at the request of Lieutenant General Herman Nickerson Jr., III Marine Amphibious Force commander.

During 1969 and 1970 the battalion's M116s and M733s were parcelled out to support the 1st, 5th, 7th and 26th Marine Regiments.

On 16 December 1970 23 battalion M116/M733s deemed to be in excess of in-country requirements were transferred to Force Logistic Command for return to Marine Corps Supply Activity, Barstow. On 27 December an M54A2C in a convoy to Cam Lộ Combat Base hit a mine killing the .50 caliber gunner.

From 1 February to 6 February 1971 20 battalion M116/M733s deemed to be in excess of in-country requirements were transferred to Force Logistic Command for return to Marine Corps Supply Activity, Barstow. This marked the end of use of these vehicles in South Vietnam. On 24 March 1971 the battalion stood down from normal operations to begin preparations to redeploy to Marine Corps Base Camp Pendleton.

On 24 April 1971 the last battalion units were loaded aboard the USS Durham and departed South Vietnam. Upon arrival at Camp Pendleton the battalion prepared for deactivation distributing its equipment throughout the 1st Marine Division. The battalion was deactivated at Camp Pendleton on 14 June 1971.

== See also ==
- List of United States Marine Corps battalions
- Organization of the United States Marine Corps
