= M76 Otter =

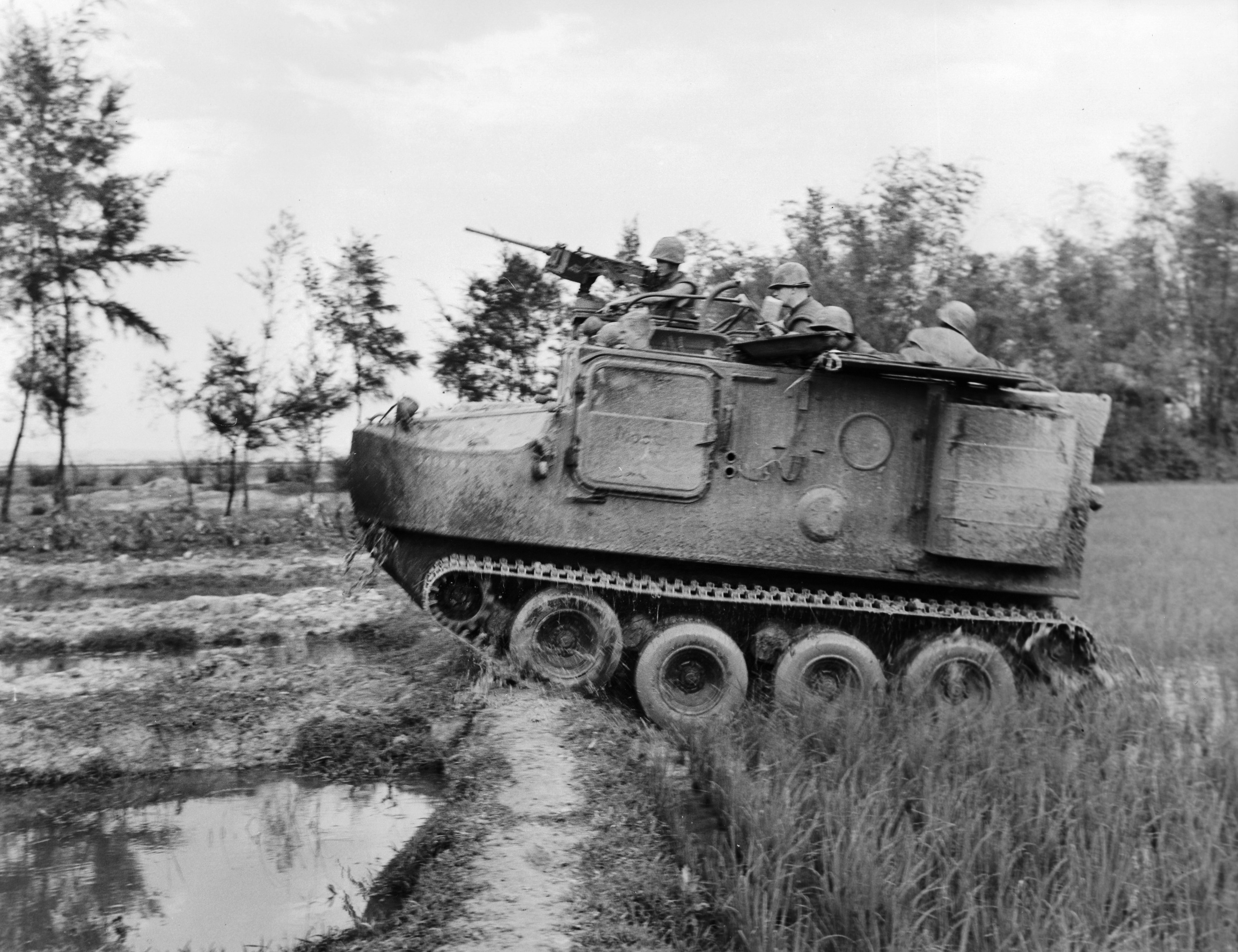
- Type: amphibious cargo carrier
- Place of origin: United States

Service history
- Wars: Vietnam War

Specifications
- Mass: 1.5 t
- Crew: 2 + 8 passengers
- Armor: 6-16 mm
- Main armament: M2 Browning

The M76 Otter was an amphibious cargo carrier used by the United States Marine Corps (USMC).

== History ==
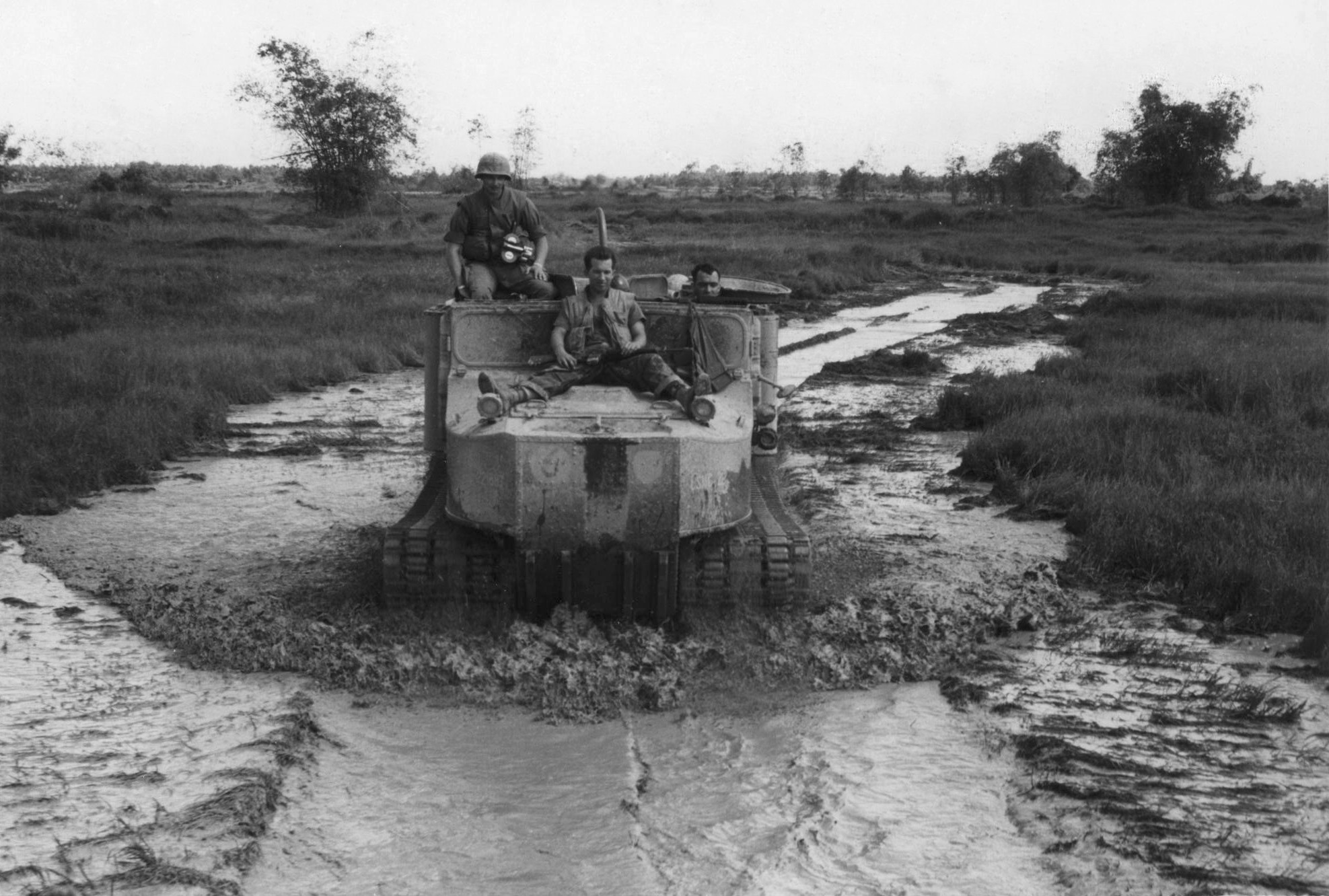
M76 crossing paddy fields

It was designed and built by Pontiac Motor Division in the late 1940s and intended as a replacement for the M29 Weasel. It entered service with the USMC in the early 1950s and many saw action in the Vietnam War. It was replaced in USMC service by the M116 Husky.

== Preserved vehicles on display ==
There are Otters on display at the following locations:

- Pacific War Museum, Guam
- Marine Corps Mechanized Museum, Camp Pendleton
