= Pacific War Museum =

Museum in Guam

- Established: May 4, 2001
- Location: Nimitz Hill, Guam
- Type: Military History

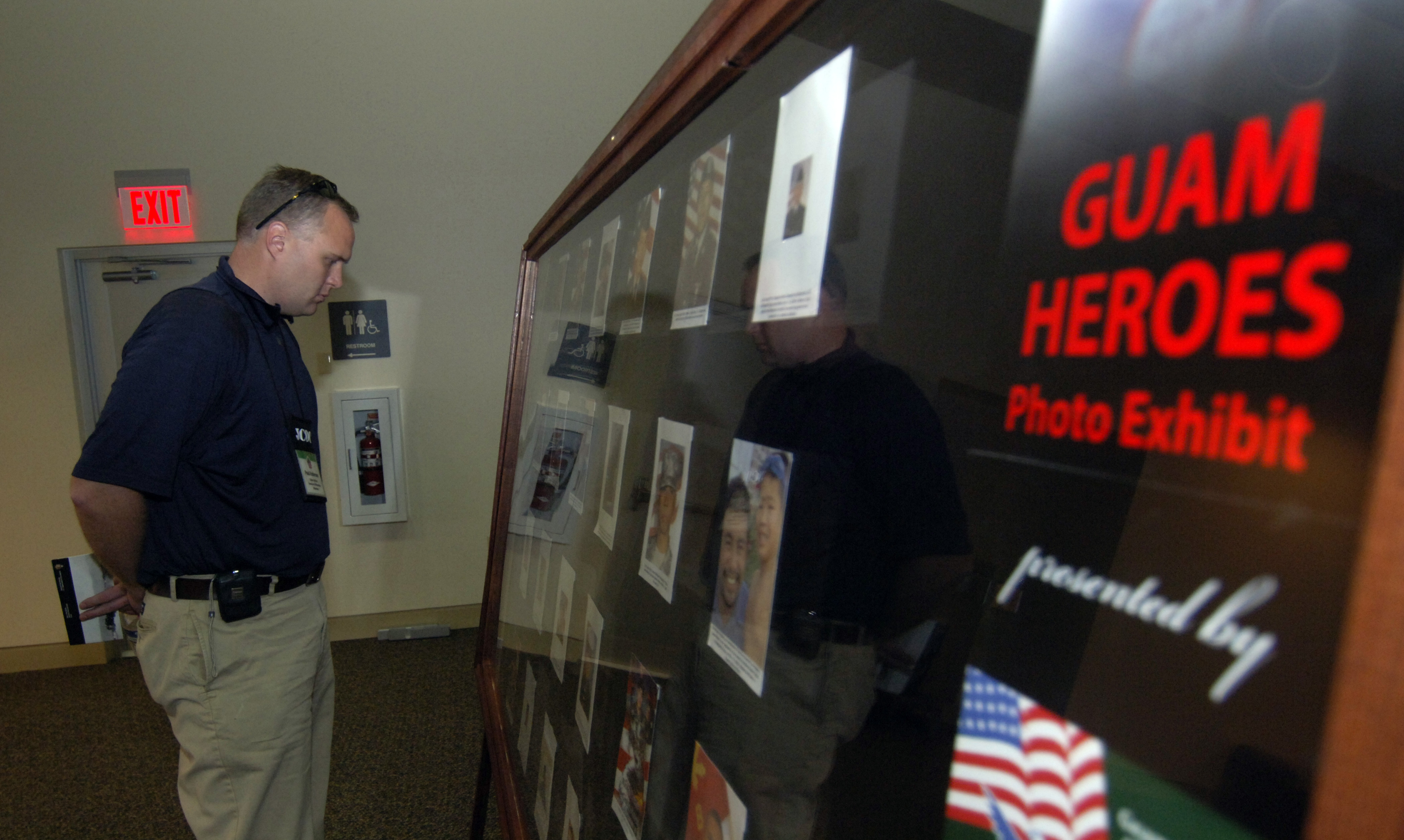
"Guam heroes" exhibit

The Pacific War Museum is on Guam. It contains exhibits related to the military in the Pacific theater of World War II with a focus on the U.S. Marines. Marine Corps Vietnam War veteran John Gerber established the museum. In 2011, the museum won the prestigious Colonel John H. Magruder III Award from the Marine Corps Historical Foundation.

== See also ==
- History of the United States Marine Corps
- Marine Corps Museums
- National Museum of the Pacific War
