= M116 Husky =

Military amphibious vehicle

- M733 armored Husky of the 11th Motor Transport Battalion in South Vietnam, 1970
- Place of origin: United States

Service history
- In service: 1960–70s
- Used by: United States
- Wars: Vietnam War

Production history
- Designer: Pacific Car and Foundry
- Manufacturer: Blaw-Knox; Pacific Car and Foundry (M733)
- No. built: 197; 93 (M733)
- Variants: M733

Specifications
- Mass: 10,600 lb (4,800 kg)
- Length: 15 ft 6 in (4.72 m)
- Width: 6.8 feet (2.1 m)
- Height: 6 ft 9 in (2.06 m)
- Crew: 1
- Passengers: 13
- Armor: none
- Main armament: none
- Engine: Chevrolet V8
- Payload capacity: 3,000 lb (1,400 kg)
- Transmission: Hydra-Matic
- Ground clearance: 15.5 in (39 cm)
- Operational range: 300 mi (480 km)
- Maximum speed: 37 mph (60 km/h) land 3.7 mph (6.0 km/h) water

The M116 Husky was a tracked amphibious cargo carrier/marginal terrain vehicle that served with the United States Marine Corps.

== Design ==
The M116 was a lightweight low-silhouette vehicle designed to transport cargo or personnel over unimproved roads, loose sand, soft marshy terrain and inland waterways. Its low ground pressure of 1.67 to 2.74 psi (11.5 to 18.9 kPa) when fully loaded gave good mobility on marginal terrain.

The M116 was designed by Pacific Car and Foundry as a replacement for the M76 Otter. Pacific Car and Foundry built four prototypes and then three pre-production models, however the production contract was awarded to Blaw-Knox which produced 197.

== Variants ==
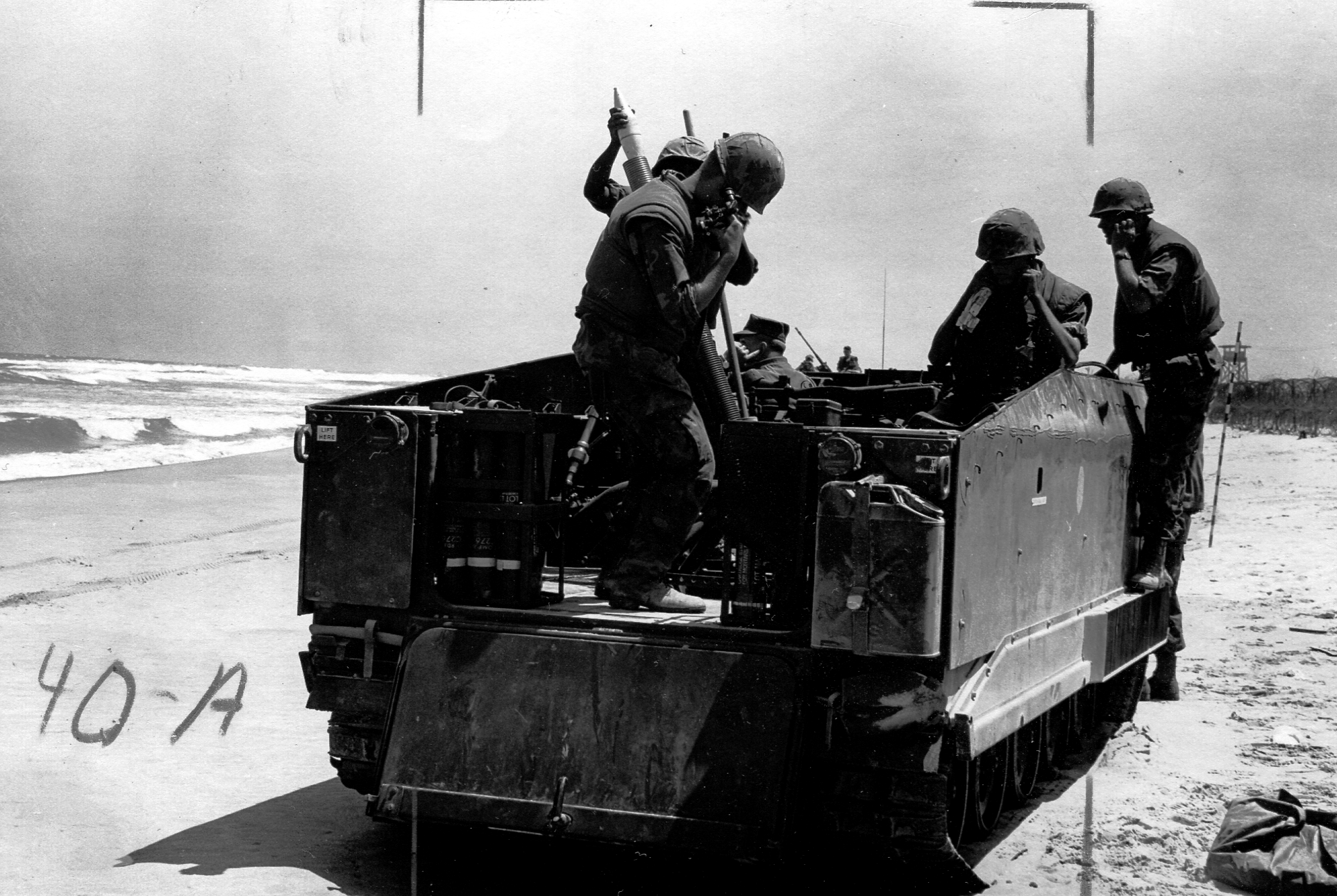
2nd Battalion 1st Marines fire an 81mm mortar from an M733 near Marble Mountains, 1970

The M733 was an armored variant of the M116 with steel armour plates added to provide ballistic protection capable of stopping .30-caliber ball ammunition. The purpose of the vehicle was to provide small arms protection for infantry security elements accompanying marginal terrain vehicles. The primary armament was one M60 machine gun, but two other pintle mounts were provided for additional M60s. The M733 could also mount the M2 Browning .50 caliber machine gun or an 81mm mortar. The M733 was produced by Pacific Car and Foundry which built 93 with the first deliveries occurring in 1966.

== History ==
Both the M116 and M733 served with the Marines in the Vietnam War. The M116E1 was placed into service in April 1969 by the 11th Motor Transport Battalion to support the 1st Marine Division in the low and often inundated areas south of Danang. Virtually unaffected by weather, the M116 had the effect of reducing reliance on helicopter support. The M733 was placed into service in August as a convoy escort.
