= List of U.S. military jeeps =

This is a list of military light utility vehicles, of the kind commonly referred to as jeeps, and typically classified as 1/4-ton payload rated, manufactured by U.S. automakers, in order of first creation.

== World War II ==
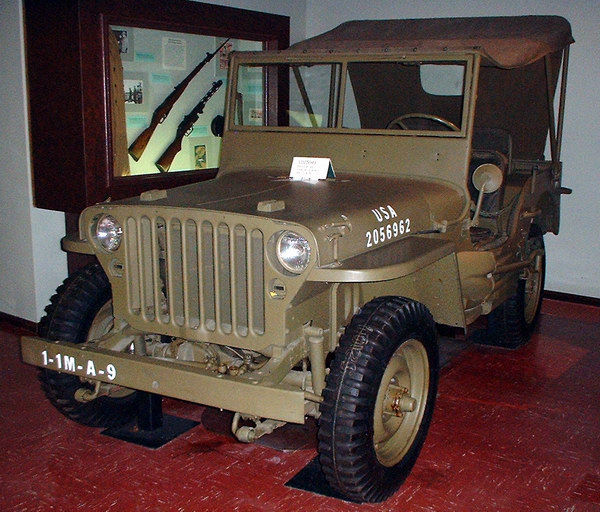
World War II era jeep built by Ford, using the Willys-Overland design.

- 1940 Dodge VC series — Pre-production run
- 1940 Bantam Pilot — Prototype
- 1940 Bantam BRC-60 — Prototypes
- 1940 Willys Quad — Prototype
- 1940 Ford Pygmy — Prototype
- 1940 Budd Ford — Prototype
- 1941 Dodge 1/2-ton WC series
- 1941 Bantam BRC-40 – pre-production models
- 1941 Ford GP – pre-production models
- 1941 Willys MA – pre-production models
- 1941 Willys T13/T14 'Super Jeep' – experimental MB stretched to 6x6, and armed with a 37 mm gun motor carriage. Although cancelled in favor of the M6 gun motor carriage, the T14 was developed into the MT-TUG cargo/prime mover.
- 1941–1944 Willys MT "Super Jeep" — experimental 6x6, 3/4-ton prototype — a small number were built in various configurations. Although performance was excellent, the MT was deemed "surplus to requirements" and cancelled in favor of existing 3/4-ton and 1 1/2-ton trucks.
- 1942 Willys MB (slat grille)
- 1942 T24 Scout Car – MT-based armored car. Although it performed well in trials, the T24 was abandoned in favor of the M8 and M20 Light Armored Car.
- 1942–1943 Ford GTB 1 1/2-ton 4x4 'Burma Jeep'
- 1942–1945 Ford GPW
- 1942–1945 Willys MB (stamped grille)
- 1943 Willys T28 – half-track based on the MT
- 1943 Willys WAC (for 'Willys Air Cooled') "Jeeplet" — prototype for a super light-weight, fulltime 4WD with front and rear independent suspension
- 1944 Willys MLW-1 (for 'Military Long Wheelbase') — prototype (never finished)
- 1944 Willys MLW-2 (for 'Military Long Wheelbase') or "Jungle Jeep" — prototype for a half-ton, jungle-suited jeeps

== Post World War II ==
- 1949–1952 M38 (Willys MC)

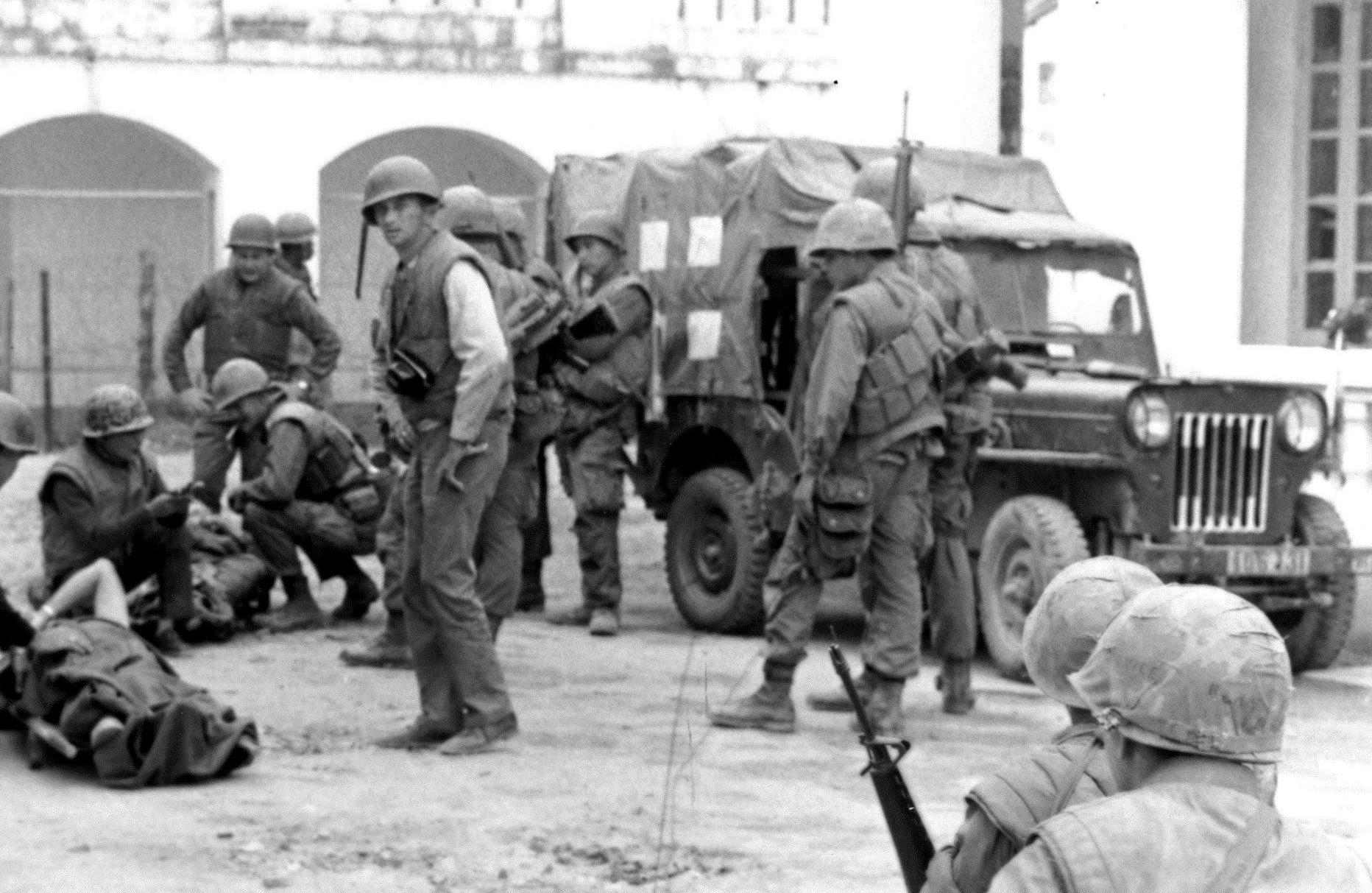
Willys M606 Ambulance: extended rear and raised top – U.S.M.C. photo.

- 1950 CJ V-35(/U) – deep water fording Willys CJ-3A; 1000 units built for the USMC
- 1952–1957 M38A1 (Willys MD)
  - 1952–1957 M38A1C fitted with 105/106mm anti-tank recoilless rifle
  - M170 Ambulance
- 1953 Willys BC Bobcat aka "Aero Jeep" — Prototype for a very small, lightweight (1475 lbs) jeep, for easier lifting by contemporaneous helicopters, eventually rejected in favor of AMC's M422 design.
- 1955 M38A1D – a small number of M38A1s carried the M28 or M29 "Davy Crockett Weapon System", the US' smallest tactical nuclear weapon, fired from a 120mm or 155mm recoilless rifle
- 1956–1968 Jeep M606

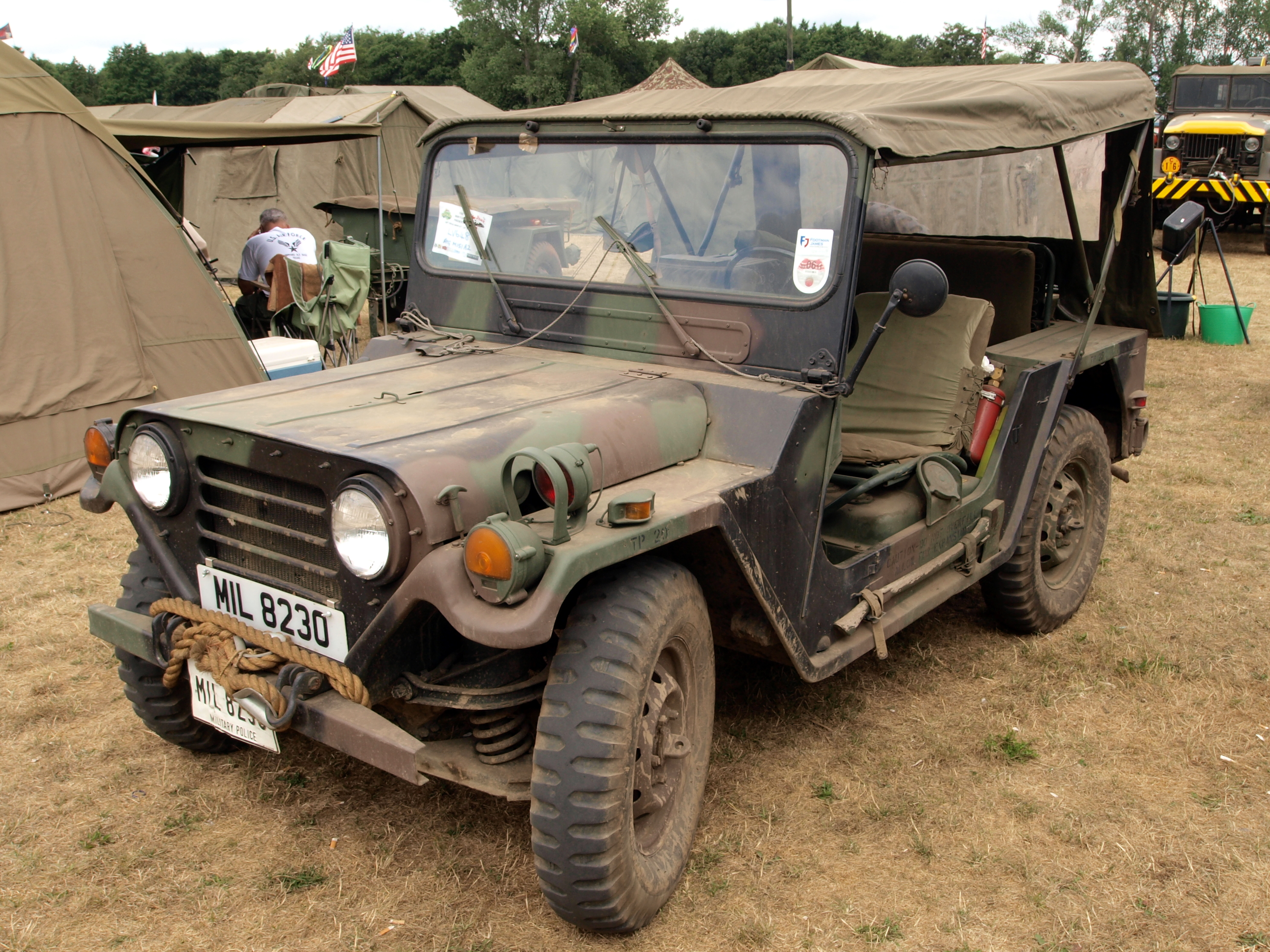
Ford M151 – the longest used U.S. jeep.

- 1959–1962 AMC M422 Mighty Mite

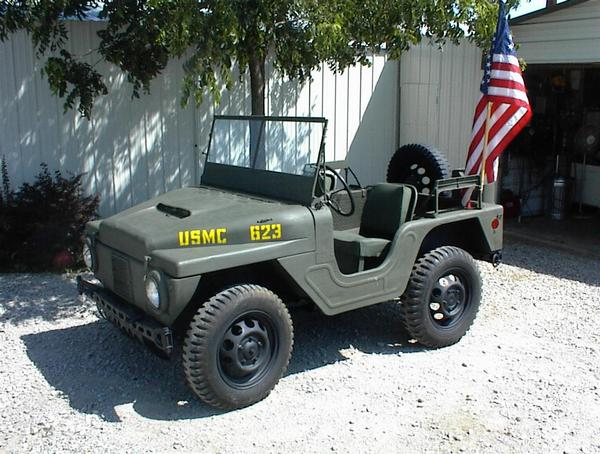
1961 M422 Mighty Mite

- 1960–1982 Ford M151
  - 1960–1964 M151
    - M718 Ambulance
  - 1964–1970 M151A1
  - M151A1C Weapons Platform
  - 1970–1982 M151A2
    - M718A1 Ambulance
    - M825 Weapons Platform

== Jeep-related vehicles unlike the jeep vehicle-concept ==
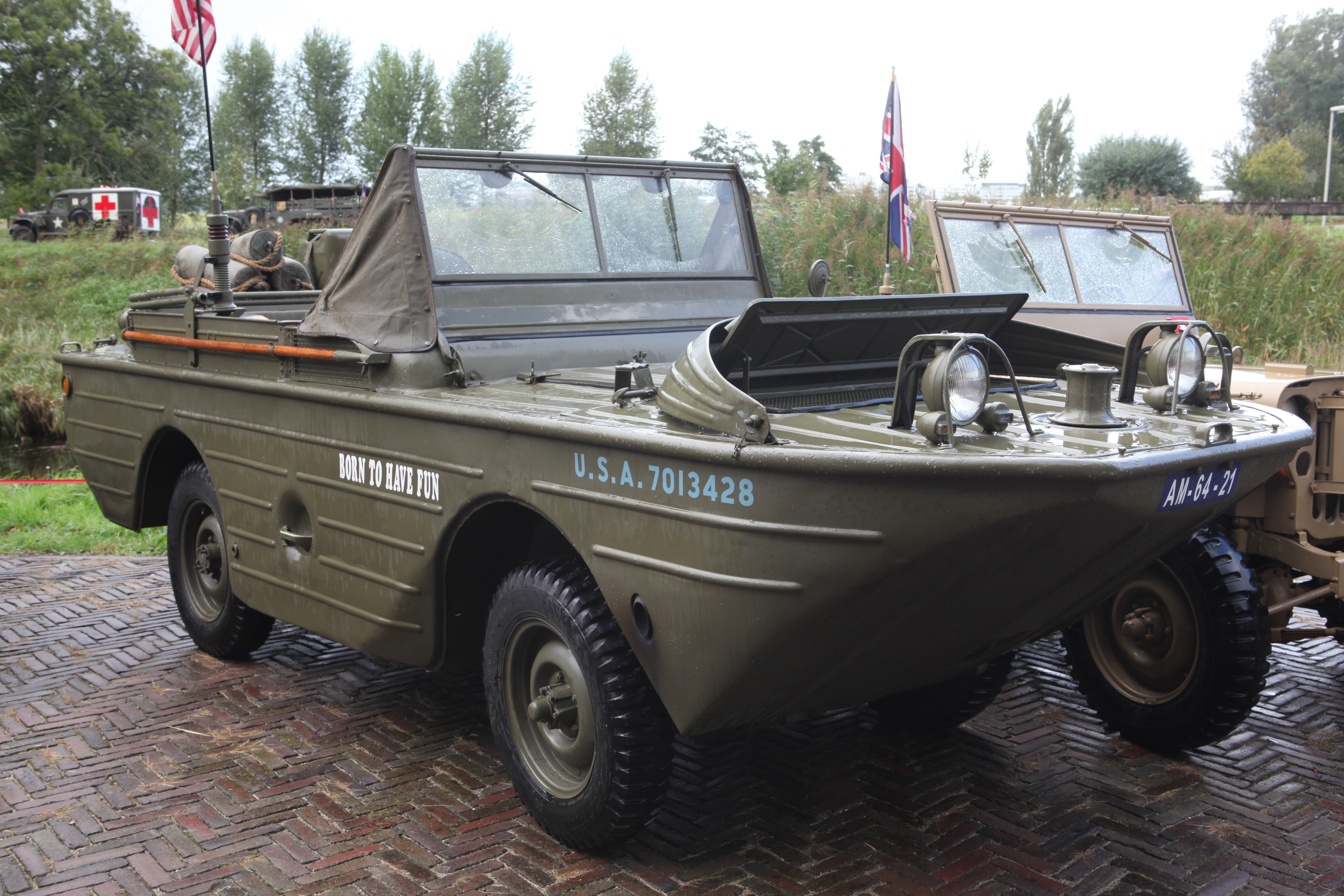
Ford GPA next to a regular World War II jeep

The U.S. has also used military vehicles that are directly related to jeeps, or were Willys / Jeep branded, but that digress significantly from the jeep vehicle-concept:

=== The amphibious jeep (WW II) ===
- 1942–1943 Ford GPA – an amphibious hulled vehicle, similar to the DUKW, but mechanically a Ford GPW jeep

=== Willys / Jeep branded, but not jeep-like vehicles ===
- 1956–1965 Jeep Forward Control military variants
  - M676 Truck, Cargo Pickup
  - M677 Truck, Cargo Pickup w/4 Dr. Cab
  - M678 Truck, Carry All
  - M679 Truck, Ambulance
- 1958-1960 Willys XM443 / M443E1 "Super Mule" – prototypes for 3/4-ton, underfloor mid-engined platform-trucks, comparable to but larger than the M274 "Mechanical Mule". Never entered production due to reliability problems.
- 1967–1969 M715 Truck — based on the commercial Kaiser Jeep Gladiator
