= Willys M38A1 =

US Army light utility vehicle

Willys / Kaiser MD / M38A1
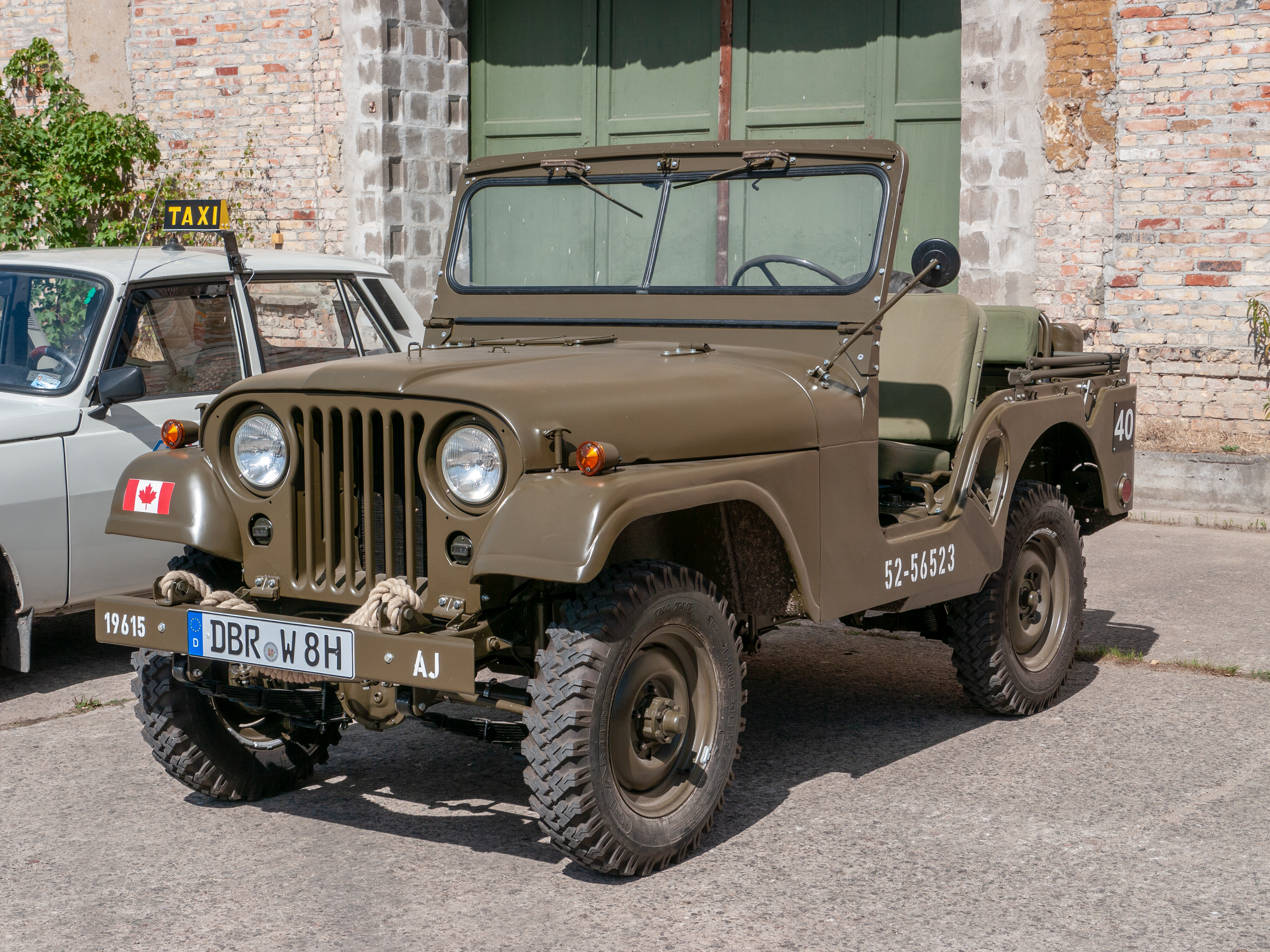
- Kaiser Jeep in Canadian colours
- Type: Quarter-ton (Note: Nominal off-road payload rating — real payload rating was over 500 kg (1,100 lb) on road; and off-road 3/8 of a ton.) 4x4 utility truck
- Place of origin: United States

Service history
- Wars: Vietnam War; Laotian Civil War; Lebanese Civil War; Gulf War other conflicts

Production history
- Manufacturer: Willys (1952–1953); Willys Motors / Kaiser Jeep (1953–1971); NEKAF (1955–1962); Sherkat-Sahami (Iran)
- Produced: 1952–1971
- No. built: 101,488 produced

Specifications
- Mass: 2,660 lb (1,210 kg)
- Length: 138.6 in (3.52 m)
- Width: 60.8 in (1.54 m) (body)
- Height: 73 in (1.85 m) with top up, reducible to 56 1/4 in (1.43 m)
- Engine: 134 cu in (2.20 L) Hurricane I4 (gasoline); 75 hp (56 kW)
- Transmission: 3-speed Borg-Warner T-90 manual

The Willys MD, formally the M38A1 Truck, Utility: 1/4 ton, 4x4, or the G‑758 by its U.S. Army Standard Nomenclature supply catalog designation, was a four-wheel drive, military light utility vehicle, made by Willys and Willys Motors / Kaiser Jeep from 1952 to 1971. It was widely procured by the U.S. military from 1952 until 1957, after which U.S. purchases were reduced to the U.S. Marine Corps. The Marine version had minor differences from the units used by other branches.

The MD was the first Willys jeep with a significantly restyled body, immediately recognizable by its rounded hood and fenders. It formed the basis for the civilian and commercial Jeep CJ‑5, built for three decades (1954–1983), and subsequent models, and called the first 'round-fendered' Jeep. Although hard doors were still not available, the soft-top could be complemented with soft side panels and little hinged doors, that consisted of a thin steel frame with cloth and plastic window.

For the U.S. Army, the MD was replaced by the Ford M151 jeep, from 1960. Low volume production of M38A1s for export to friendly foreign governments continued through 1971. Production totalled 101,488 units (80,290 domestic / 21,198 foreign sales). M38A1 jeeps saw extensive service during the Korean War, Vietnam War and several other conflicts.

== Description ==
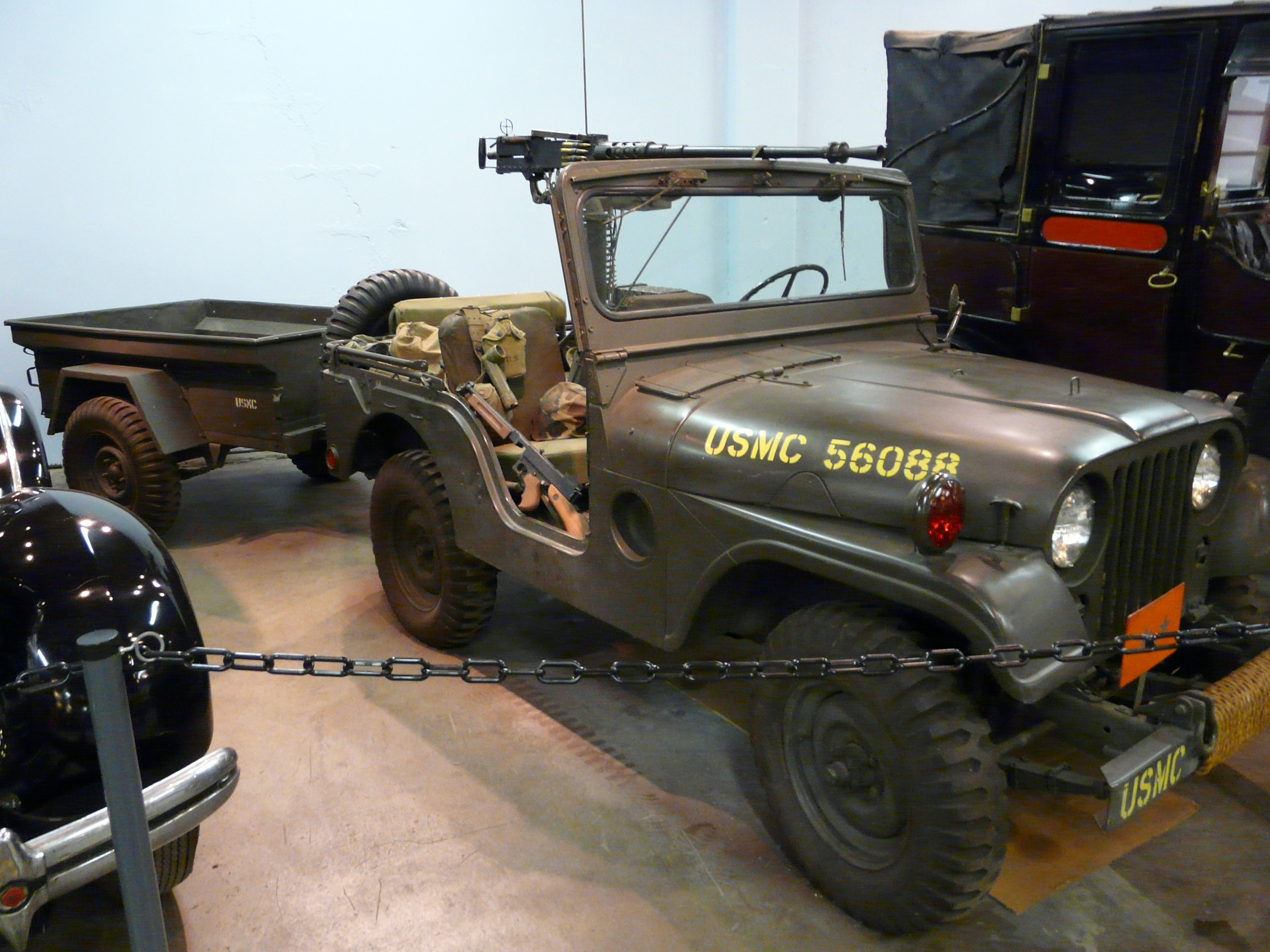
The M38A1 was frequently mated with the M100 (Korean War) version of the Jeep trailer.

The M38A1 / MD was the second post-war evolution of the World War II Willys MB jeep (after the M38 or MC; F engine Prototypes), and the first Willys Jeep to feature the new rounded fenders and hood body design that would become the distinguishing body style of the 1955 CJ‑5, and which was carried through for decades on the CJ‑6, CJ‑7 and CJ‑8 Jeeps.
The M38A1's wheelbase grew by a single inch (2.5cm), and overall length by some 6 in (15 cm).

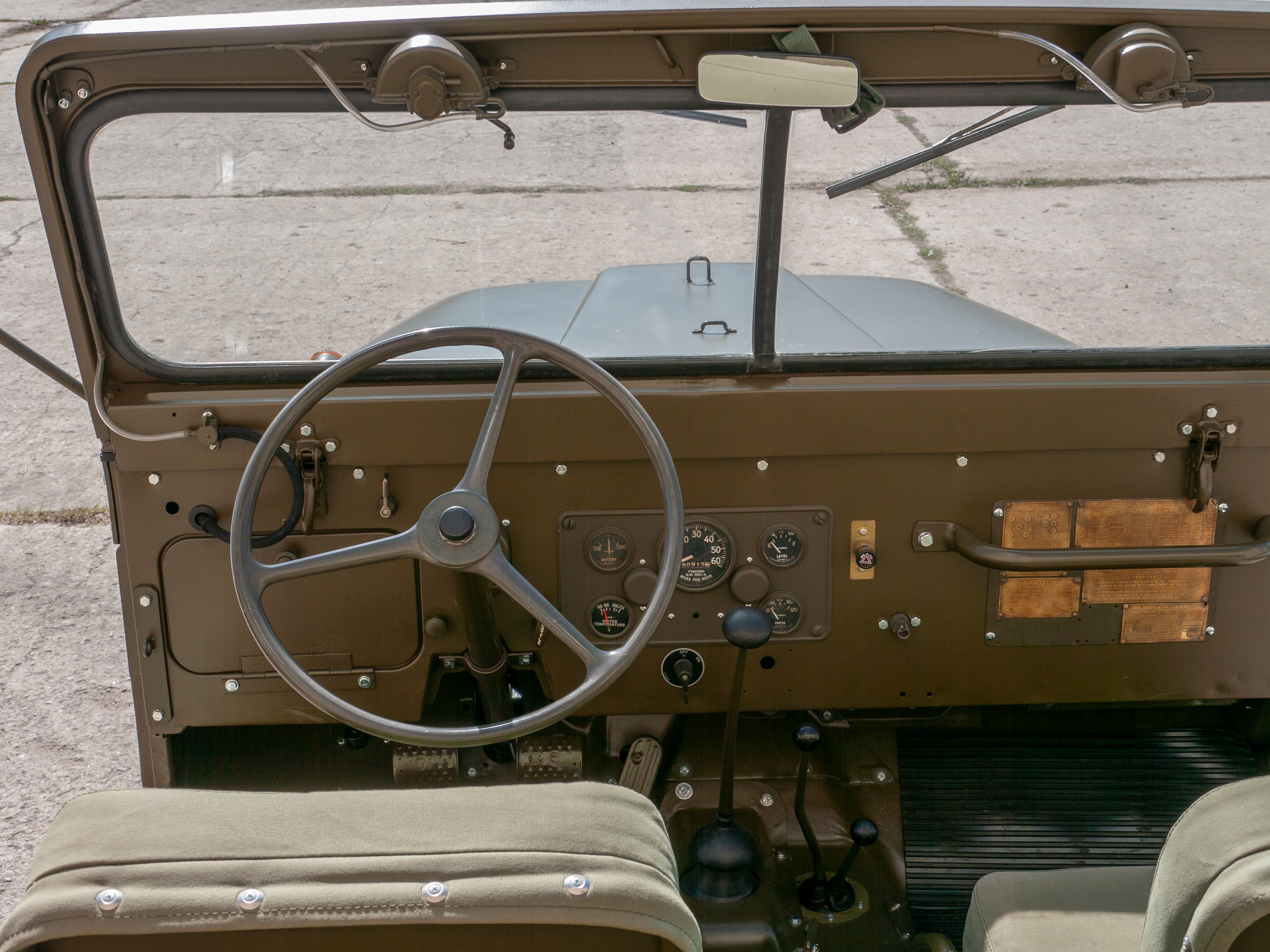
M38A1 cabin / dashboard

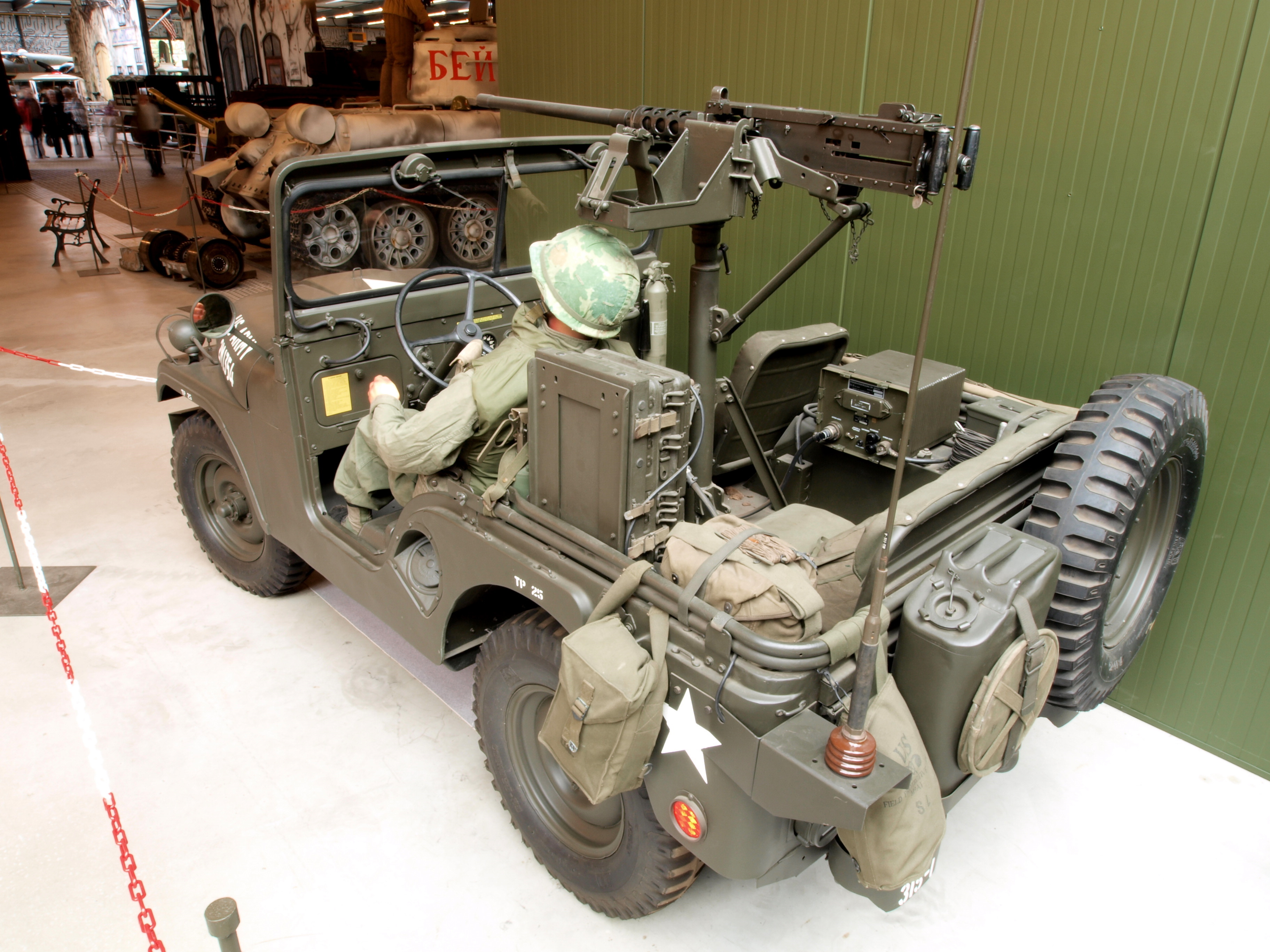
M38A1C spotter unit with .50 cal machine gun.

=== Drive train ===
The M38A1 was the first Army jeep to use the Willys Hurricane F-Head 134 inline-four engine. This engine was taller than the 'Go-Devil' engine that powered the WWII era jeeps and the M38, and was the reason for restyling the body over the higher power plant.

Otherwise, the MD had a T-90 3-speed transmission, Dana 18 transfer case, either the Dana 25 or the Dana 27 front axle, and Dana 44 rear axle.

== Variants ==
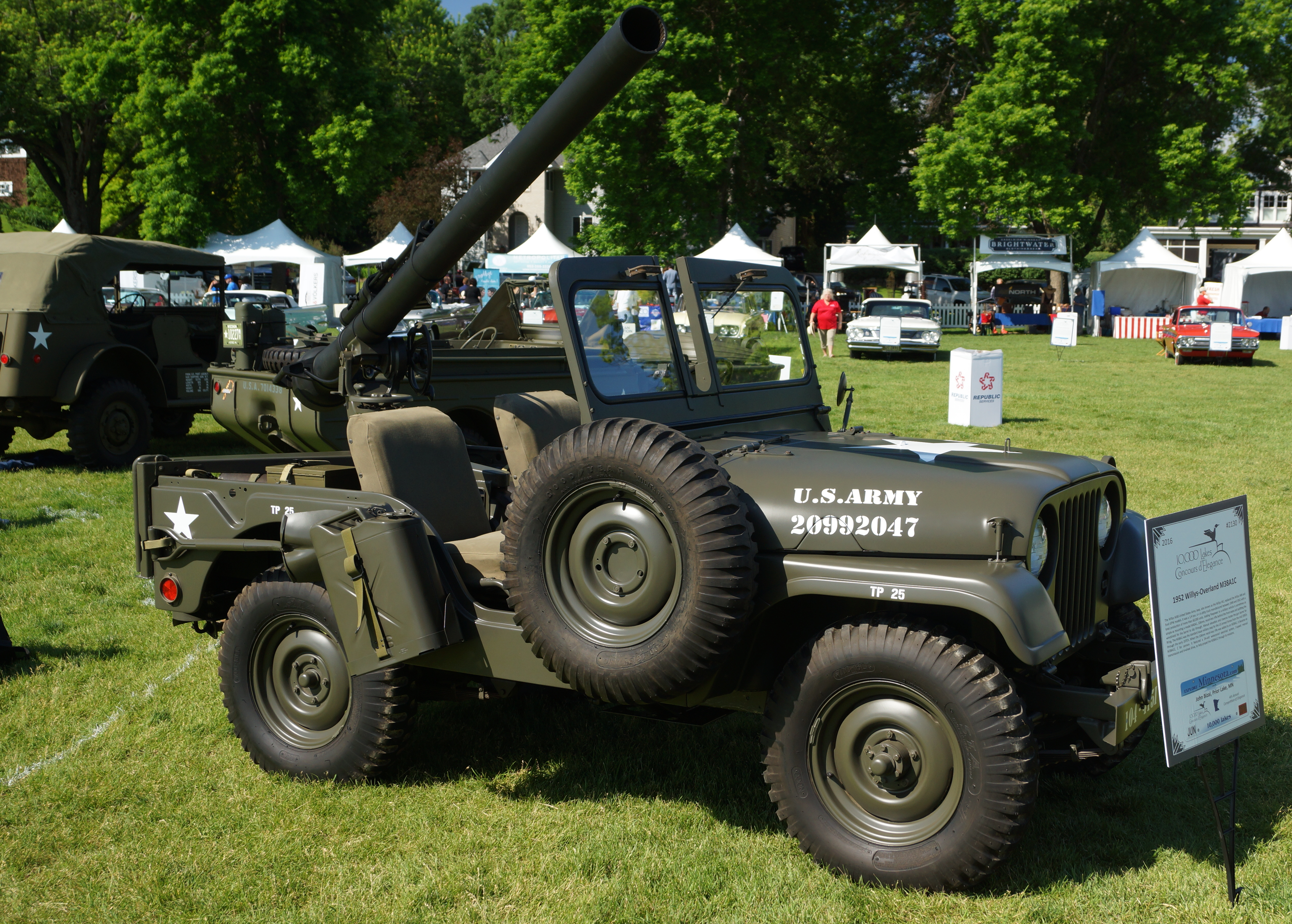
M38A1C with 106 mm recoilless gun.

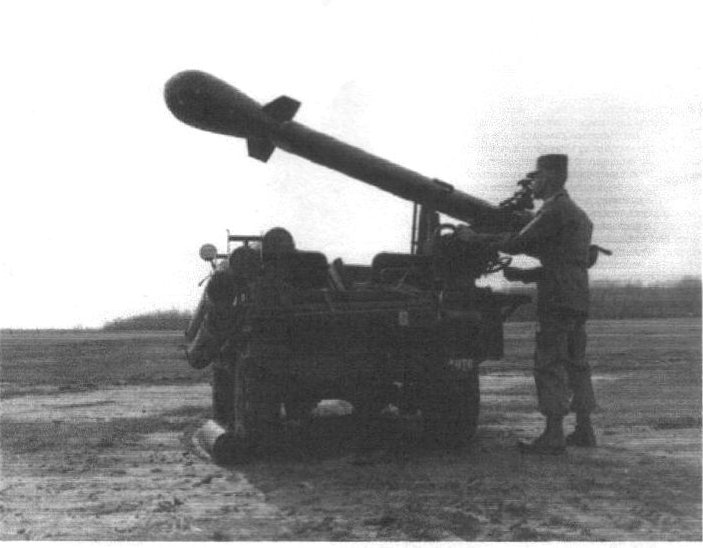
M38A1'D' used in the Little Feller I nuclear test.

=== M38A1 (MD) ===
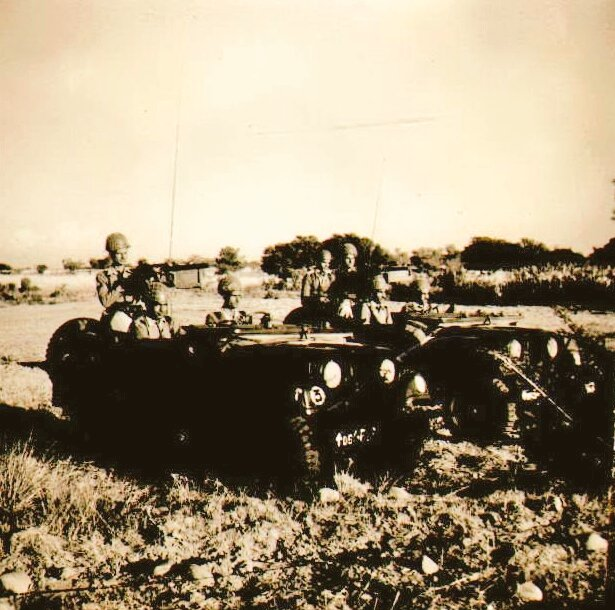
Pakistani M38A1(MD) of the 12th FFR's Reconnaissance & Support Battalions.

Basic utility version. Would regularly be equipped with M2 .50 cal machine gun and/or radio equipment and antenna-mount. On early units (1952–1953) the front grille was mounted with two 45 degree hinges, one at each frame rail, to flip it forward for maintenance.

=== M38A1C ===
Modified version equipped with a M40A1 106 mm recoilless rifle. They were fitted with a .50 caliber M8C semi-automatic spotting rifle. The spotting would be fired first, to ensure a first round hit with the 106mm recoilless rifle. The .50 caliber spotter cartridge was 22mm shorter than the standard .50 caliber machine gun cartridge. A slot was provided in the windshield frame for the 106mm barrel when traveling.

=== M38A1'D' ===
Several dozen M38A1s were converted, mounting a tactical nuclear Davy Crockett Weapon System, fired by a large diameter smoothbore recoilless rifle – either an M28 120 mm, or an M29 155 mm gun. The vehicle carried two M388 projectiles, mounting the Mk-54 nuclear warhead. The range of weapon was approximately 1.25 miles (2 km), with the M28 gun, or 2.5 miles (4 km) with the M29. This vehicle/weapon combination was also referred to as the "Battle Group Atomic Delivery System", and was allocated to airborne units.

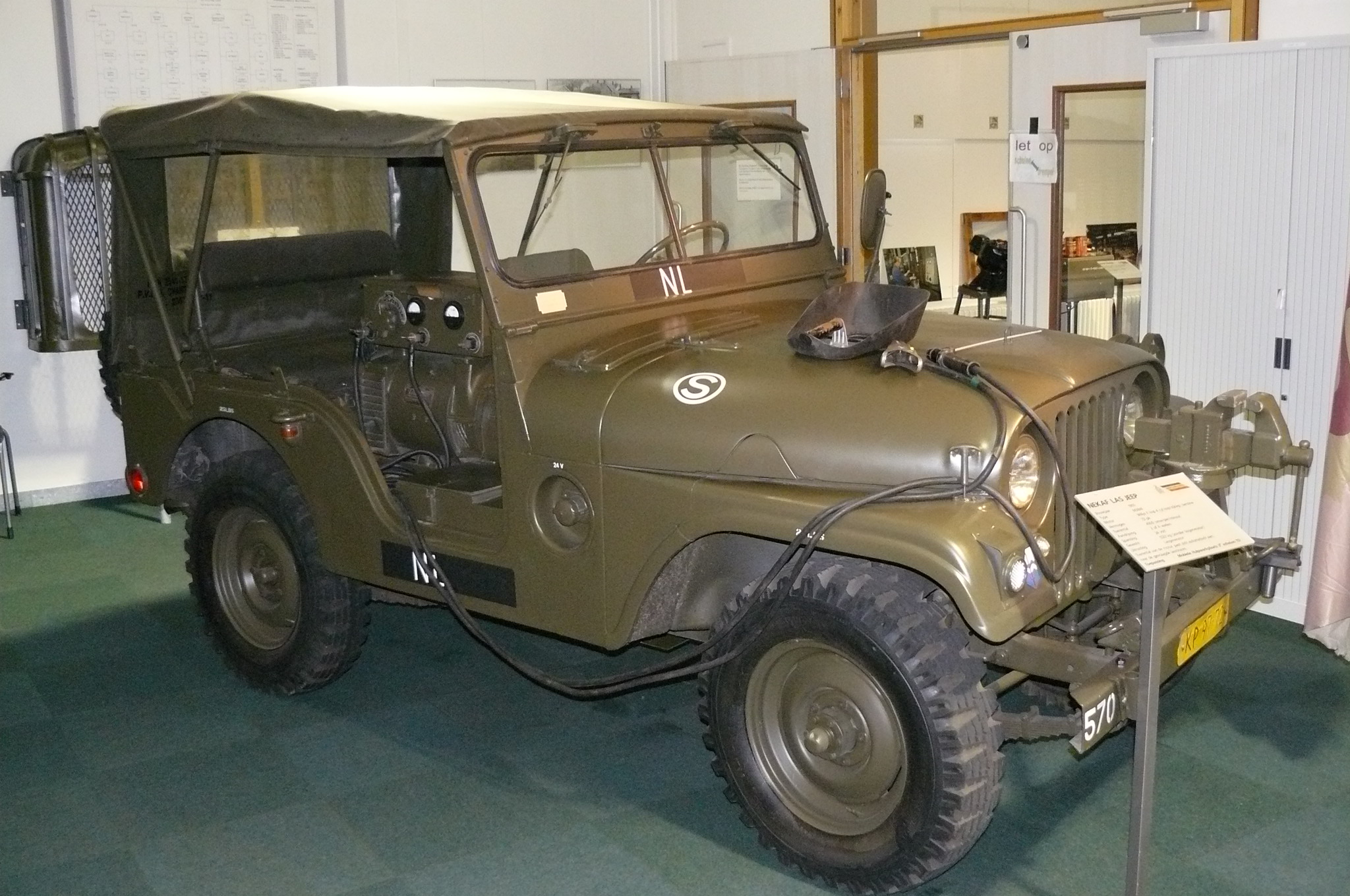
The Dutch used this M38A1 with generator and mobile welder

=== M38A1 Welding Unit ===
Just one unit is assumed to have been built, originally fitted with a Harger & Valentine field arc-welding system, powered by a power take-off driven generator.

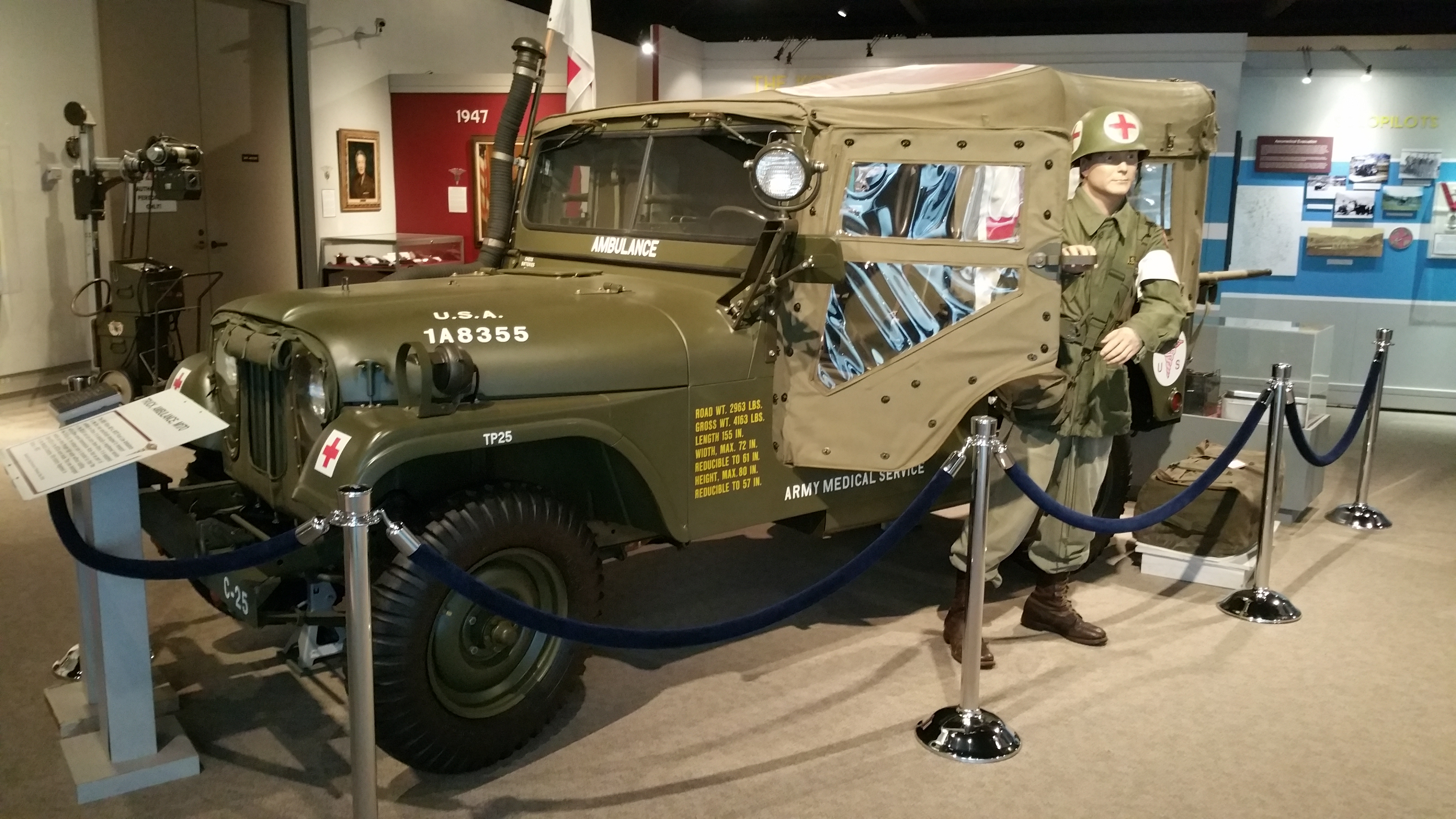
M170 long wheelbase ambulance version

=== M170 ambulance ===
The M170 Frontline Ambulance variant of the M38A1, with a 20 in (51 cm) stretched wheelbase, formed the basis for the later civilian Willys Jeep CJ‑6. The spare tire was relocated in a special wheel well on the right interior side of the vehicle, and a larger 20 US gal (76 L) fuel tank was fitted. Capacity was six seated patients, or three lying on litters. A total of 4,155 M170 ambulances were designed and built by Kaiser Jeep of Toledo, Ohio, from the mid-1950s to the early 1960s.

=== U.S. Marines ===
There is no official, nor uniform specification, for the M38A1s that were manufactured specifically for the United States Marine Corps. USMC jeeps were fitted with reinforced bumpers to allow for the addition of lift rings, permitting helicopter airlift. Most USMC jeeps were fitted with both front and rear lift rings. The rear lift rings were fitted (by or for USMC) in a different position, than standard jeeps had been prepared for from the factory.
Further, most USMC jeeps had more waterproofing, and roughly two thirds of them received more undercoating – to the frame exterior, under the floor and hood, and the bottom half of the firewall. For better traction, the Marine Corps started ordering limited-slip differentials, especially on the rear axle, and mostly after introduction of the M151 jeeps in the Army. USMC jeeps were painted 34052 forest green, with flat yellow numbering on the hood only. Little or no other markings were applied on USMC jeeps.

=== Canadian ===
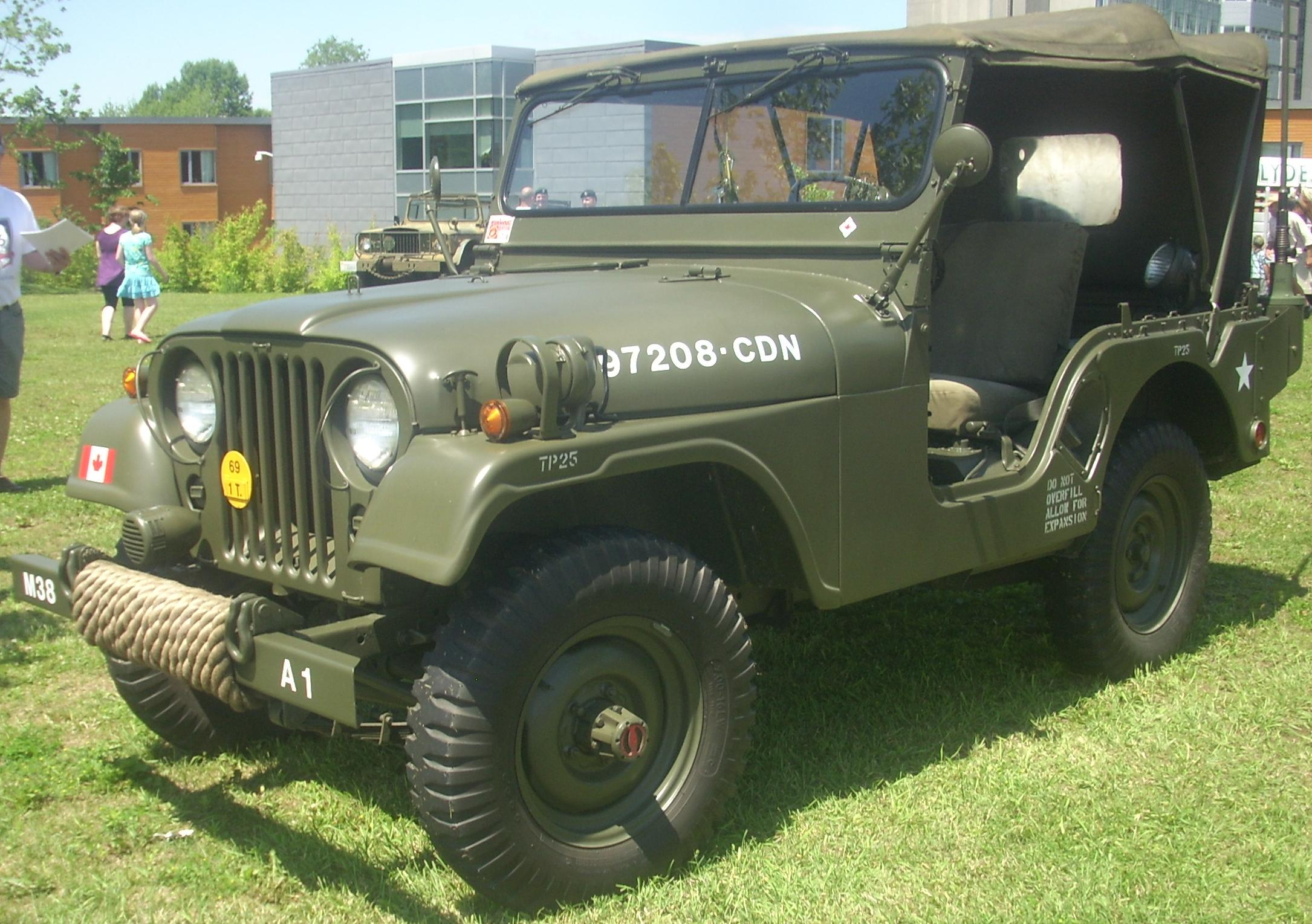
Canadian M38A1 jeep

Canadian variants: M38A1CDN, M38A1CDN2 produced in Canada and M38A1CDN3 produced in the USA.

According to Canadian author David Dunlop, over 1,000 M38A1 CDN jeeps were built by Ford of Canada in 1952/1953.
Next, Kaiser Jeep of Canada Ltd started assembling Jeeps in Windsor in 1954 or in 1959, in the former Willys factory, established there in 1934. Initially building only CJ-5 jeeps, at a targeted rate of 1,000 a year, in 1967 a Canadian government contract came, to build 800 M38A1 CDN2 Jeeps for the Canadian Forces at $2,789,000 CDN. M38A1 CDN3 jeeps were built in the USA for Canada in 1970-1971. Unclear about 1959-69 Windsor production is how many other Jeep models and units were built for the Canadian military. Anecdotal evidence has surfaced of a domestic Canadian Navy unit, built in 1964.

=== Dutch NEKAF jeeps ===
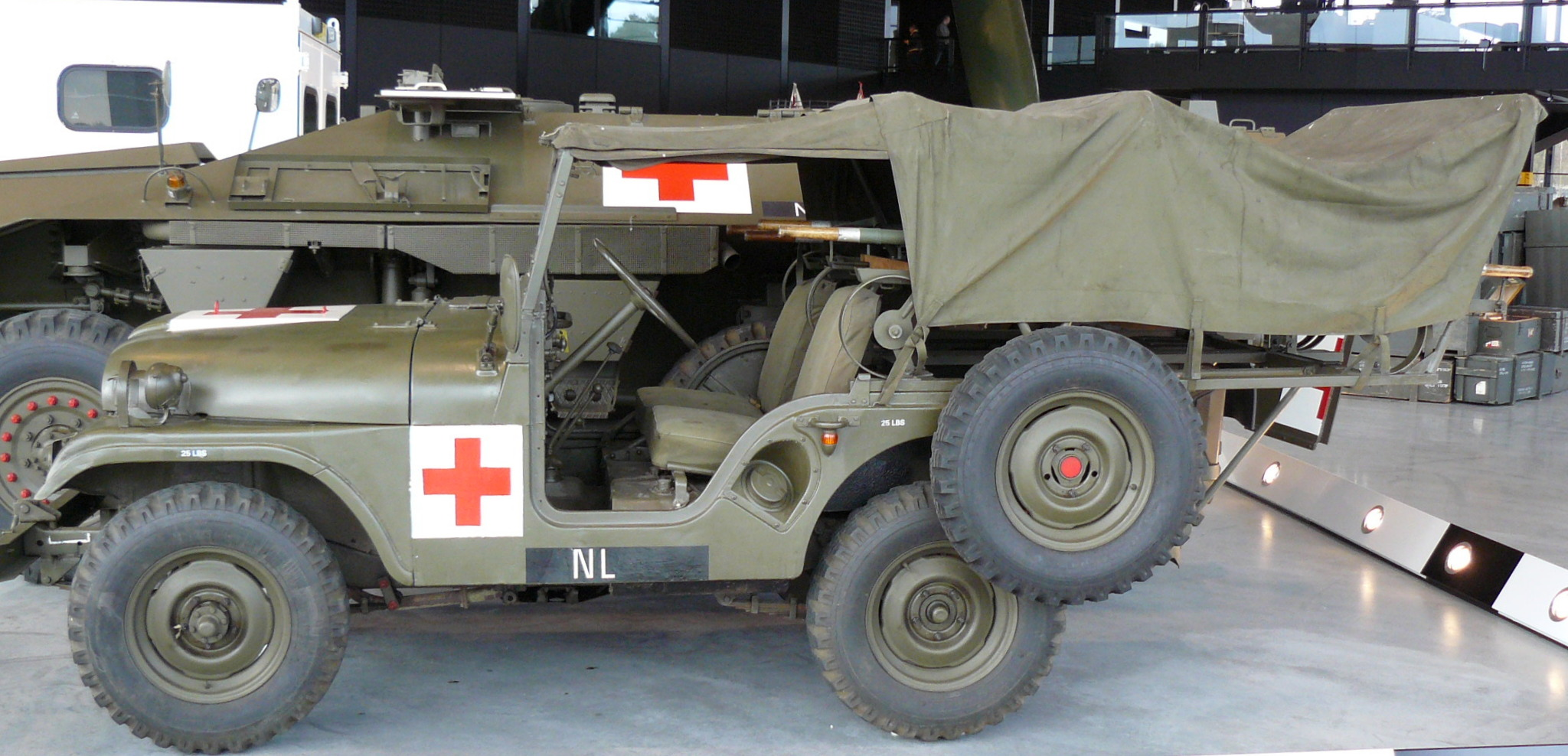
The Dutch Army used the short wheelbase M38A1, rather than the long wheelbase M170, as an ambulance..

After initially using surplus U.S. war jeeps after World War II, a successor model was required by the Royal Netherlands Army, from the early 1950s. Wanting to support Dutch industry, a prototype four-wheel drive design by the country's only volume car and truck manufacturer DAF, the H-driven DAF YA-054, was considered, competing with U.S.-built M38A1s, a number of which had been supplied under the Mutual Defense Assistance program.

The DAF proposal seemed neither better nor cheaper and lost the race, but as an economic stimulus, the American Jeeps were to be assembled in Holland from knock-down kits parts, made in the U.S.A., in the "Netherlands Kaiser-Frazer" (NEKAF) factory. Eventually some 24 % of the NEKAF jeep's parts were supplied by Dutch firms. Nekaf jeeps were identical to U.S. M38A1s, except for minor lighting additions.

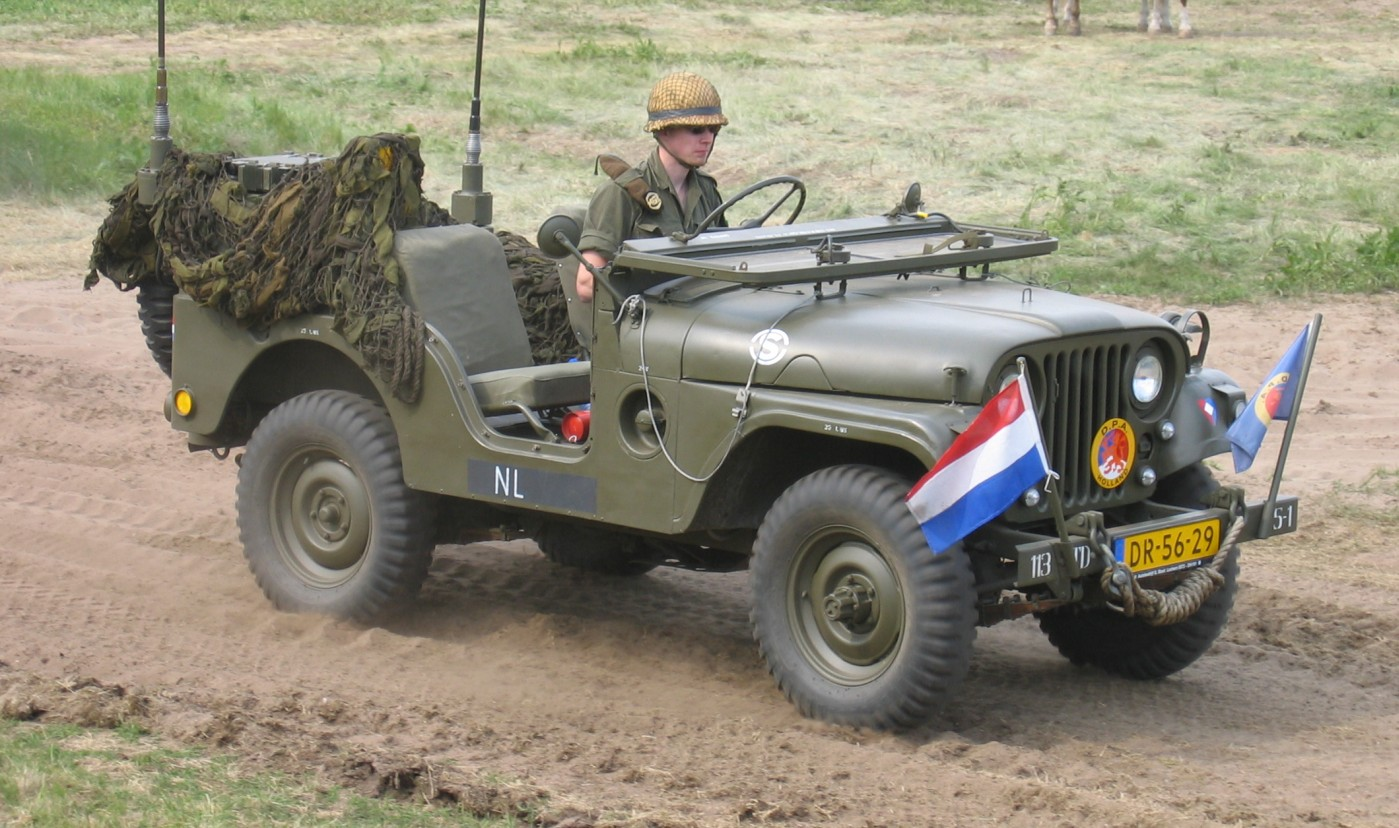
Dutch Army M38A1 MD jeep

Production spanned from 1955 to 1958, under Kaiser-Frazer (some 5,650 units), after which time production was taken over by a Dutch company, who delivered another 2,237 jeeps through 1963, still using the 'NEKAF' name, for a total of just under 8,000 units. The M38A1 Jeep eventually served with one of the longest service records in the Royal Dutch military, for more than 40 years, from 1952 until 1996, as a result of both budget constraints, and sheer longevity of the vehicles, even outlasting the DKW Mungas, which had been bought to replace them in Dutch service, as well as some 1,200 DAF YA 66s supplied in the 1970s, which had little to no off-road capability, and which were decommissioned in the early 1990s.

After 1959, with American part sets, 355 Nekafs were converted to M38A1C: 106mm M40 recoilless rifle carriers, and from 1983 to 1989, forty M38A1Cs were equipped with cable-guided TOW missiles.

=== Iranian ===
Jeep Truck copies (variously called the Simurg or Simoorgh) are produced by the firm of Sherkat-Sahami in Iran.

== Operators ==
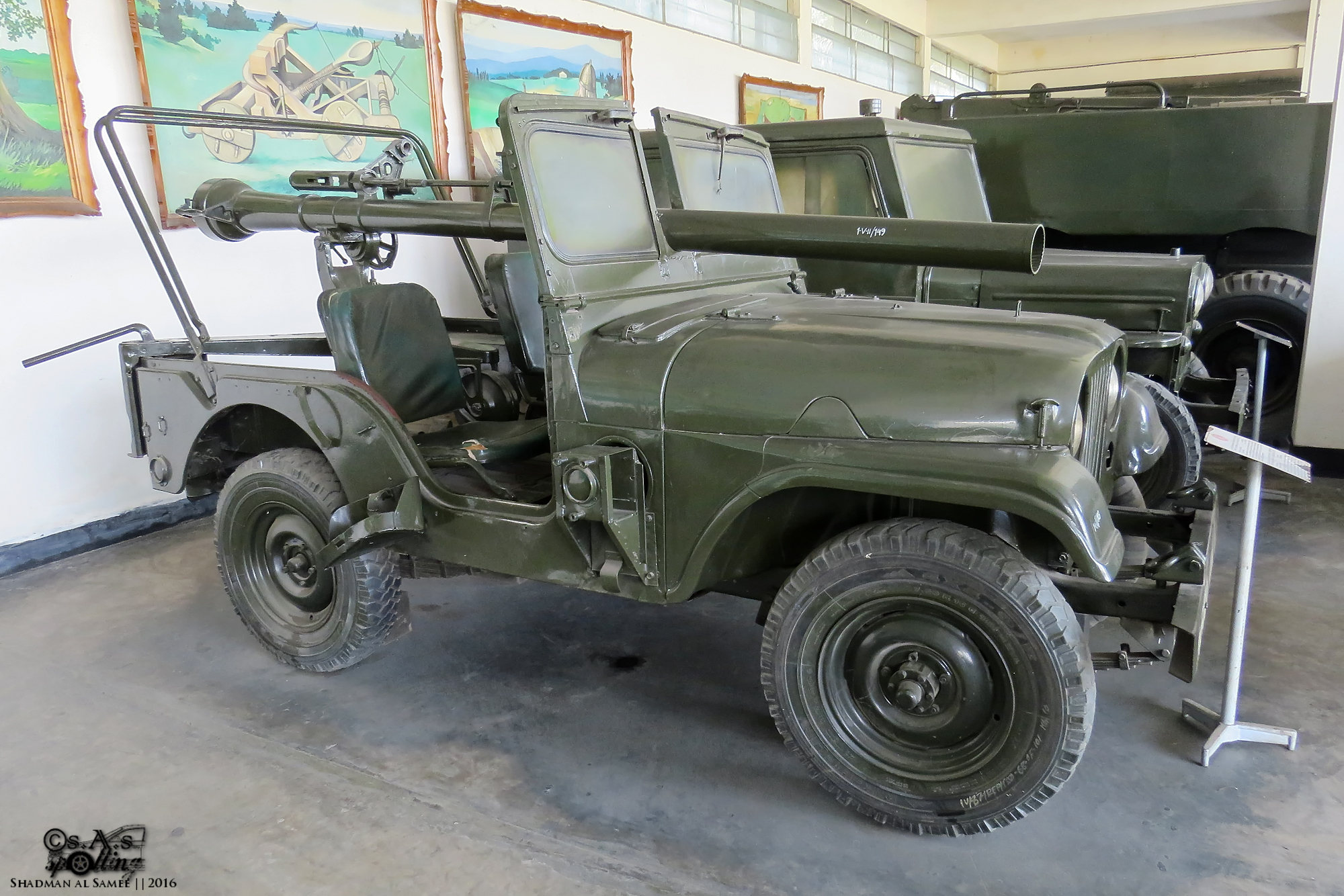
An ex-Bangladesh Army (obtained from surrendered Pakistan Army stocks in 1971) M38A1C with M40 recoilless rifle, in the Bangladesh Military Museum.

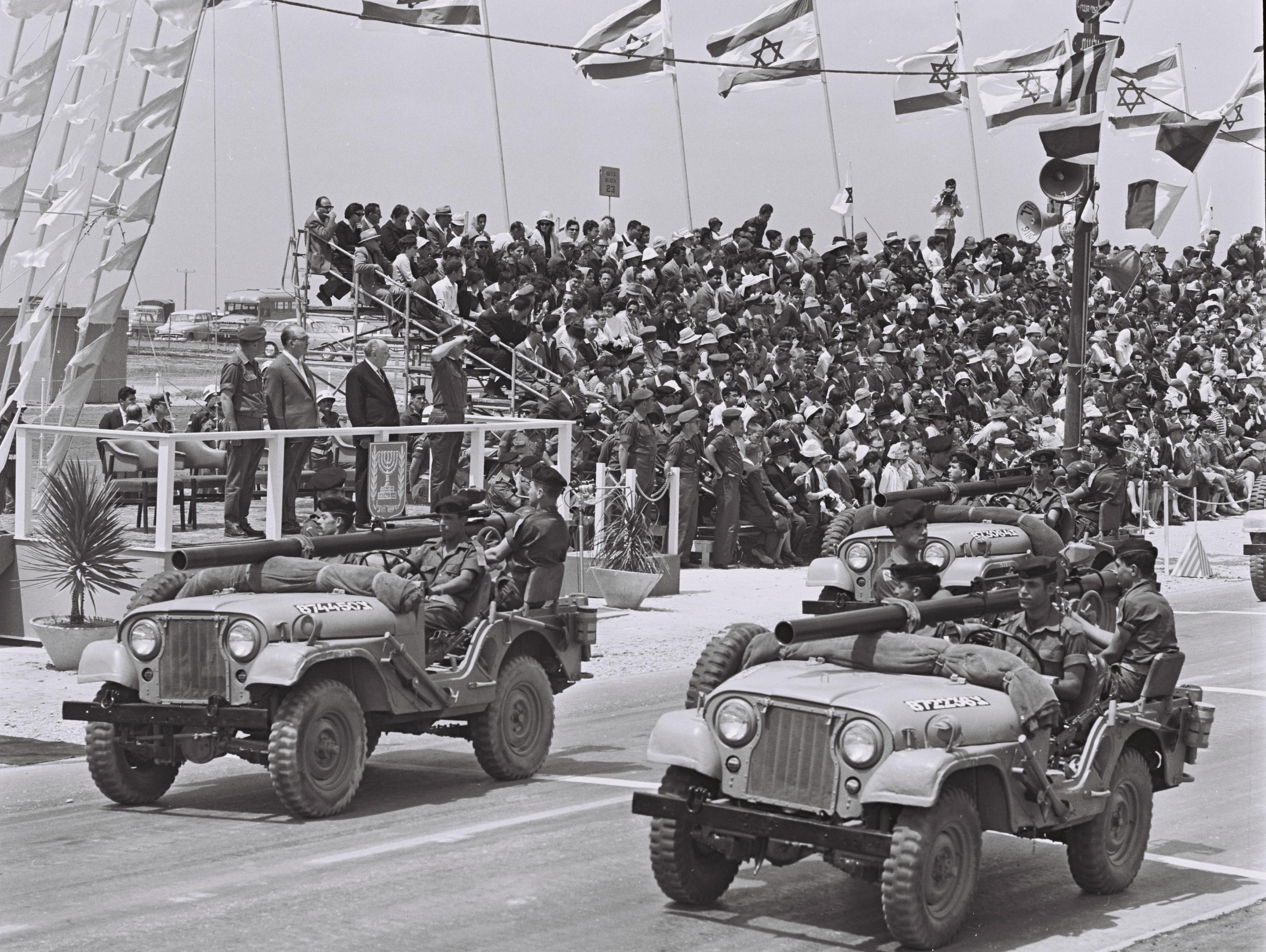
Israeli M38A1C anti-tank jeeps with mounted 106 mm recoilless rifles at the Independance Day parade, Beer-sheba, Israel, April 1964.

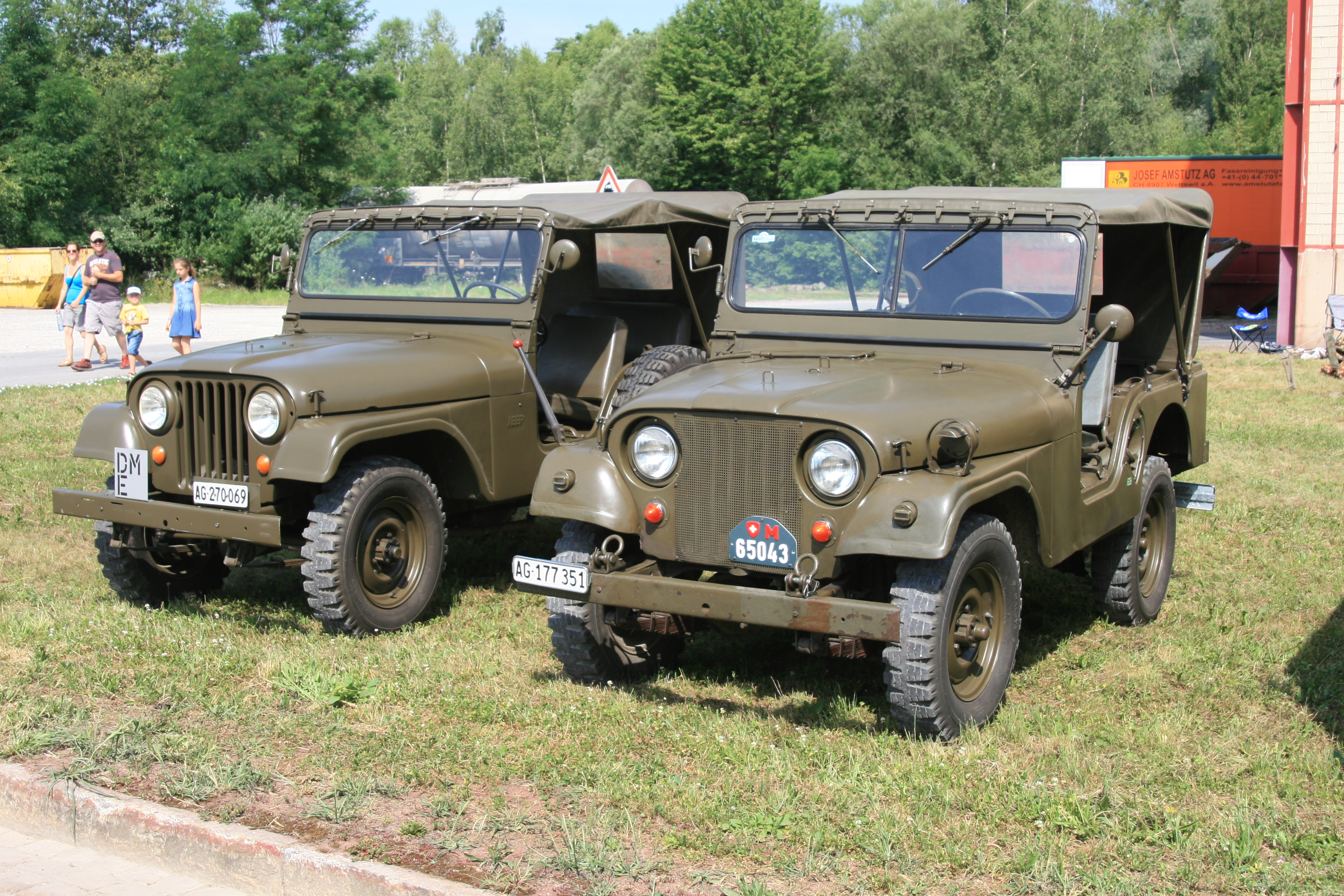
Ex-Swiss Armed Forces' Willys M38A1 jeeps, 2005.

- Bangladesh: M38A1 MD, M38A1C versions used by the Bangladesh Army.
- Brazil: M38A1 MD, M38A1C, CJ-5 and Brazilian-produced versions used by the Brazilian Army.
- Canada: M38A1 MD, M38A1Cdn, M38A1Cdn2 and M38A1Cdn3 Canadian-produced versions used by the Canadian Army.
- Chad: used by the Chadian Armed Forces (FAT), Chadian National Armed Forces (FANT) and Chadian National Army (ANT).
- Cuba: M38A1 MD version used by the Cuban Army during the Cuban Revolution.
- Croatia: M38A1 MD and CJ-5 versions used by the Croatian National Guard during the Croatian War of Independence (1991‑1995).
- Denmark: M38A1 MD and M38A1C versions used by the Royal Danish Army.
- Egypt: Jeep CJ-7, Jeep CJ-8, Jeep TJ, Jeep JK, and Jeep J8 Egyptian-produced KADER versions used by the Egyptian Army.
- El Salvador: CJ-5 version used by the Salvadoran Army during the Salvadoran Civil War.
- Greece: M38A1 MD and M38A1C versions used by the Hellenic Army.
- Guatemala: Jeep CJ-7 used by the Armed Forces of Guatemala. Supplemented in service by successor model Jeep J8 APV.s
- Israel: M38A1 MD, M38A1C, and Israeli-modified versions used by the Israel Defense Forces and Israel security forces; replaced by the AIL Storm.
- Iran: M38A1 MD, M38A1C, and Iranian-produced Simoorgh versions.
- Kuwait: M38A1 MD version used by the Kuwait Police.
- Jordan: M38A1 MD and M38A1C versions used by the Jordanian Armed Forces.
- Katanga: M38A1 MD version used by the Katangese Gendarmerie during the Congo Crisis.
- Kingdom of Laos: M38A1 MD version used by the Royal Lao Armed Forces and the Royal Lao Police during the Laotian Civil War (1954-1975).
- Lebanon: M38A1 MD version used by the Regional Gendarmerie and the Lebanese Armed Forces.
- Libya: Egyptian-produced Jeep TJL version.
- Myanmar: M38A1 MD version used by the Myanmar Army.
- Netherlands: M38A1 MD and Dutch-produced NEKAF versions used by the Royal Netherlands Army.
- Nicaragua: M38A1 MD and CJ-5 versions used by the National Guard of Nicaragua.
- Pakistan: M38A1 MD and M38A1C versions used by the Pakistan Army.
- Portugal: M38A1 MD and CJ-5 versions used by the Portuguese Army during the Portuguese Colonial War.
- (Democratic Republic of the Congo) Republic of the Congo: M38A1 MD version used by the Armée Nationale Congolaise (ANC) during the Congo Crisis.
- Rhodesia: M38A1 MD version used by the Rhodesian Security Forces.
- South Korea: M38A1 MD versions used by the Republic of Korea Armed Forces.
- South Vietnam: M38A1 MD version used by the Republic of Vietnam Military Forces and the Republic of Vietnam National Police during the Vietnam War.
- Soviet Union: Captured Iranian-produced versions re-used by Spetsnaz special forces teams during the Soviet–Afghan War.
- Spain: M38A1 MD and M38A1C versions used by the Spanish Armed Forces.
- Switzerland: M38A1 MD and M38A1C versions used by the Swiss Armed Forces.
- Turkey: M38A1 MD and M38A1C versions used by the Turkish Army.
- United States: M38A1 MD, M38A1C, M170, USMC variant, and USAF DJ versions.
- Republic of China: M38A1 MD and M38A1C versions used by the Republic of China Army and the Republic of China Marine Corps.

=== Non-state military operators ===
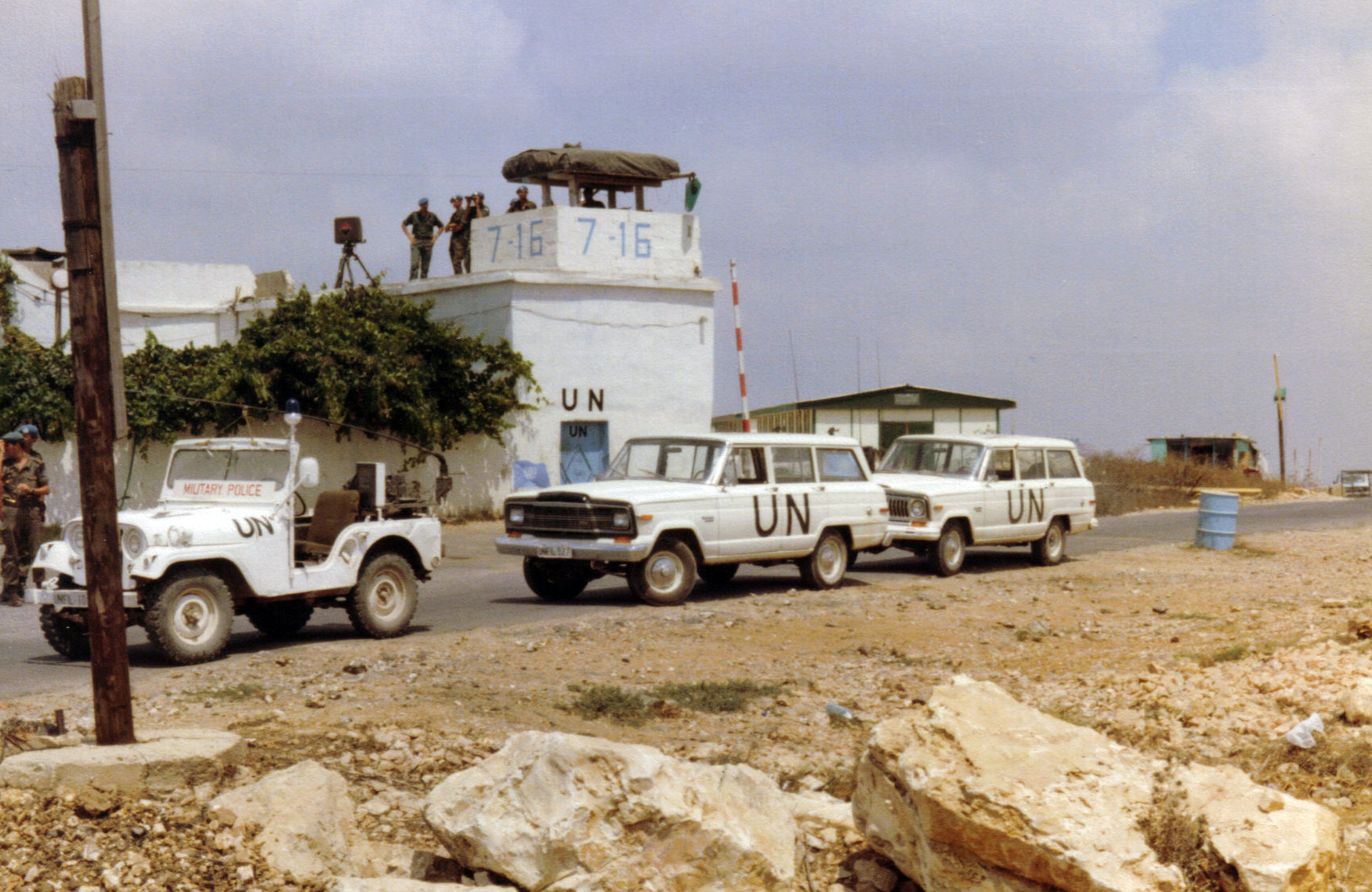
United Nations (UNIFIL) peace-keeping Jeeps, operated by Dutchbat in Al-Yatun, southern Lebanon, 1981.

- 26th of July Movement: M38A1 MD version captured from the Cuban Army.
- Afghan Mujahideen: Iranian-produced Simurg or Simoorgh variants employed during the Soviet–Afghan War.
- Al-Mourabitoun: M38A1 MD and CJ-5 versions.
- Army of Free Lebanon (AFL): M38A1 MD and CJ-5 versions.
- Amal Movement: CJ-5 and CJ-8 versions.
- Arab Democratic Party (Lebanon): CJ-5 and CJ-8 versions.
- Progressive Socialist Party/ People's Liberation Army (PLA): M38A1 MD and CJ-5 and CJ-8 versions.
- Kataeb Regulatory Forces (KRF): M38A1 MD and Israeli-modified versions.
- Lebanese Arab Army (LAA): M38A1 MD and CJ-5 versions.
- Lebanese Forces: M38A1 MD, Israeli-modified versions.
- Palestine Liberation Organization (PLO): M38A1 MD and CJ-5 versions used by the Palestinian guerrilla factions in Lebanon.
- Sandinista National Liberation Front (FSLN): M38A1 MD and CJ-5 versions captured from the National Guard of Nicaragua.
- South Lebanon Army (SLA): M38A1 MD and Israeli-modified versions.
- Syrian Social Nationalist Party in Lebanon/Eagles of the Whirlwind: CJ-5 and CJ-8 versions.
- Tigers Militia: M38A1 MD and CJ-5 versions.
- United Nations: M38A1 MD and CJ-5 versions.
- Zgharta Liberation Army (a.k.a. Marada Brigade): CJ-5 and CJ-8 versions.

== Service history ==
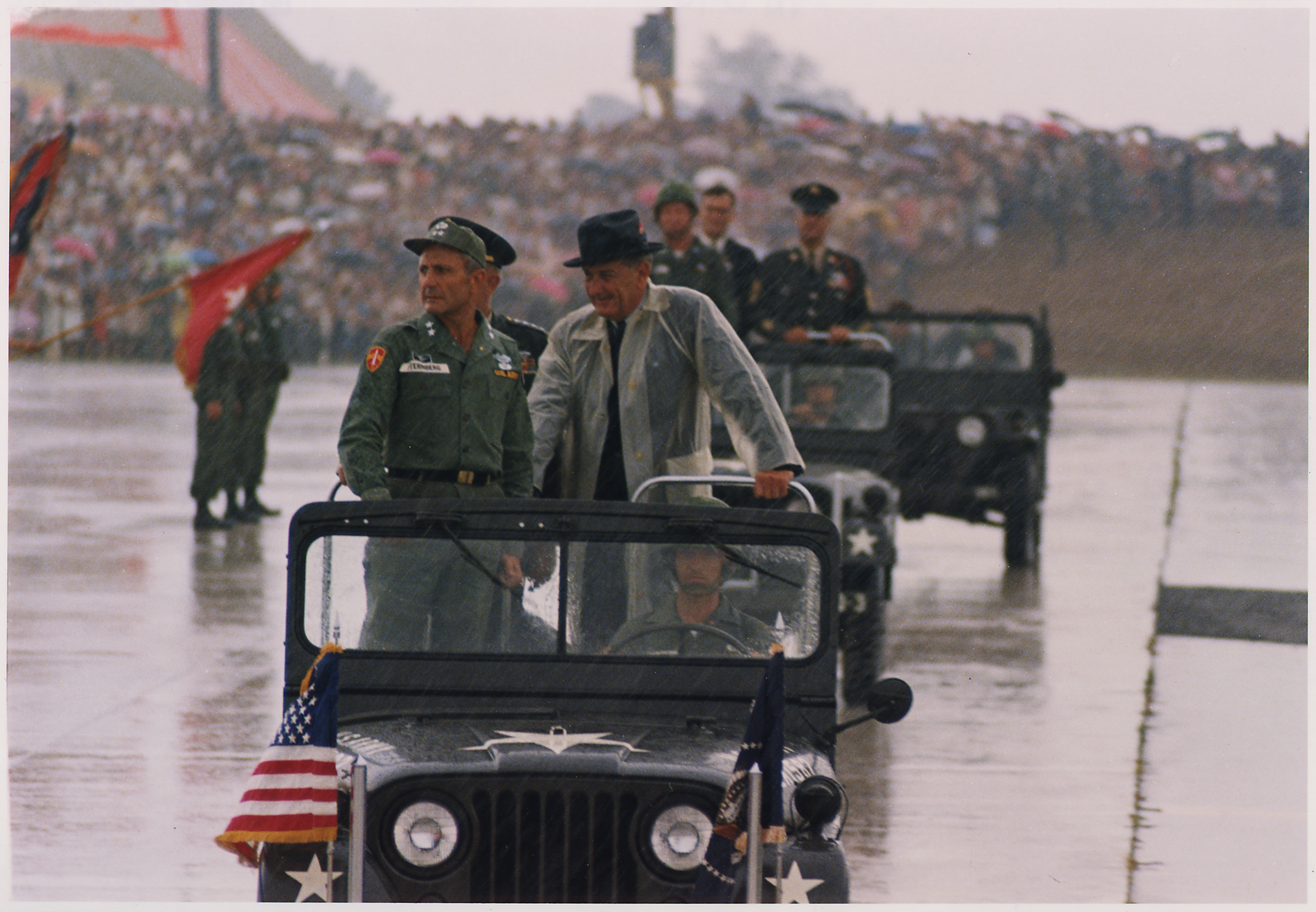
President Lyndon B. Johnson riding in an M38A1.

- Korean War
- 1958 Lebanon crisis
- Cuban Revolution
- Nicaraguan Revolution
- Guatemalan Civil War
- Salvadoran Civil War
- Portuguese Colonial War
- Carnation Revolution
- Congo Crisis
- Rhodesian Bush War
- Vietnam War
- Laotian Civil War
- Six-Day War
- Black September
- Indo-Pakistani War of 1971
- Bangladesh Liberation War
- Internal conflict in Myanmar
- War of Attrition
- Yom Kippur War
- Turkish invasion of Cyprus
- Operation Entebbe
- 1982 Lebanon War
- Lebanese Civil War
- Soviet–Afghan War
- Iran–Iraq War
- Chadian–Libyan conflict
- Toyota War
- Gulf War
- Croatian War of Independence

== See also ==
- Austin Champ
- Austin Gipsy
- Jeep CJ
- Jeep DJ
- Jeep Wrangler (TJ; JK)
- Jeep J8
- Jeepster Commando
- M151 ¼-ton 4×4 utility truck
- List of U.S. military jeeps
- List of weapons of the Lebanese Civil War
- List of weapons of the Laotian Civil War
- Weapons of the Salvadoran Civil War
- Willys M38

== General references ==
- TM 9-804A 1/4-ton 4x4 utility truck M38A1, Technical manual (1952)
- TH 9-345 NEKAF M38A1 Dutch M38A1 made by NEKAF, Technical manual (1957)
- Aniceto Afonso and Carlos de Matos Gomes, Guerra Colonial: Angola – Guiné – Moçambique, Editorial Notícias, Lisbon 2000. ISBN 972-46-1192-2 (in Portuguese)
- Conboy, Kenneth; Greer, Don (1994). War in Laos 1954-1975. Carrollton, TX: Squadron/Signal Publications. ISBN 0-89747-315-9.
- El-Assad, Moustafa (2008). Civil Wars Volume 1: The Gun Trucks. Sidon: Blue Steel books. ISBN 978-9953-0-1256-8.
- Kassis, Samer (2003). 30 Years of Military Vehicles in Lebanon. Beirut: Elite Group. ISBN 9953-0-0705-5.
- Kassis, Samer (2012). Véhicules Militaires au Liban/Military Vehicles in Lebanon 1975-1981. Chyah: Trebia Publishing. ISBN 978-9953-0-2372-4.
- Ken Conboy, The Erawan War – Volume 3: The Royal Lao Armed Forces 1961-1974, Asia@War Volume 37, Helion & Company Limited, Warwick UK 2022b. ISBN 978-1-804512-87-6
- Naud, Philipe (August–September 2012). "La Guerre Civile Libanaise - 1re partie: 1975-1978". Steelmasters Magazine (in French). pp. 8–16. ISSN 1962-4654.
- Neville, Leigh (2018). Technicals: Non-Standard Tactical Vehicles from the Great Toyota War to modern Special Forces. New Vanguard series 257. Oxford: Osprey Publishing Ltd. ISBN 978-1-4728-2251-2.
- Sex, Zachary; Abi-Chahine, Bassel (2021). Modern Conflicts 2 – The Lebanese Civil War, From 1975 to 1991 and Beyond. Modern Conflicts Profile Guide. Vol. II. AK Interactive. EAN 8435568306073.
- Frank E. Walton, A Survey of the Laos National Police, Office of Public Safety, Agency for International Development, Department of State, Washington, D.C., 1965. –
