= M151 ¼-ton 4×4 utility truck =

Discontinued American military vehicle

M151 Truck, Utility, ¼-Ton, 4×4
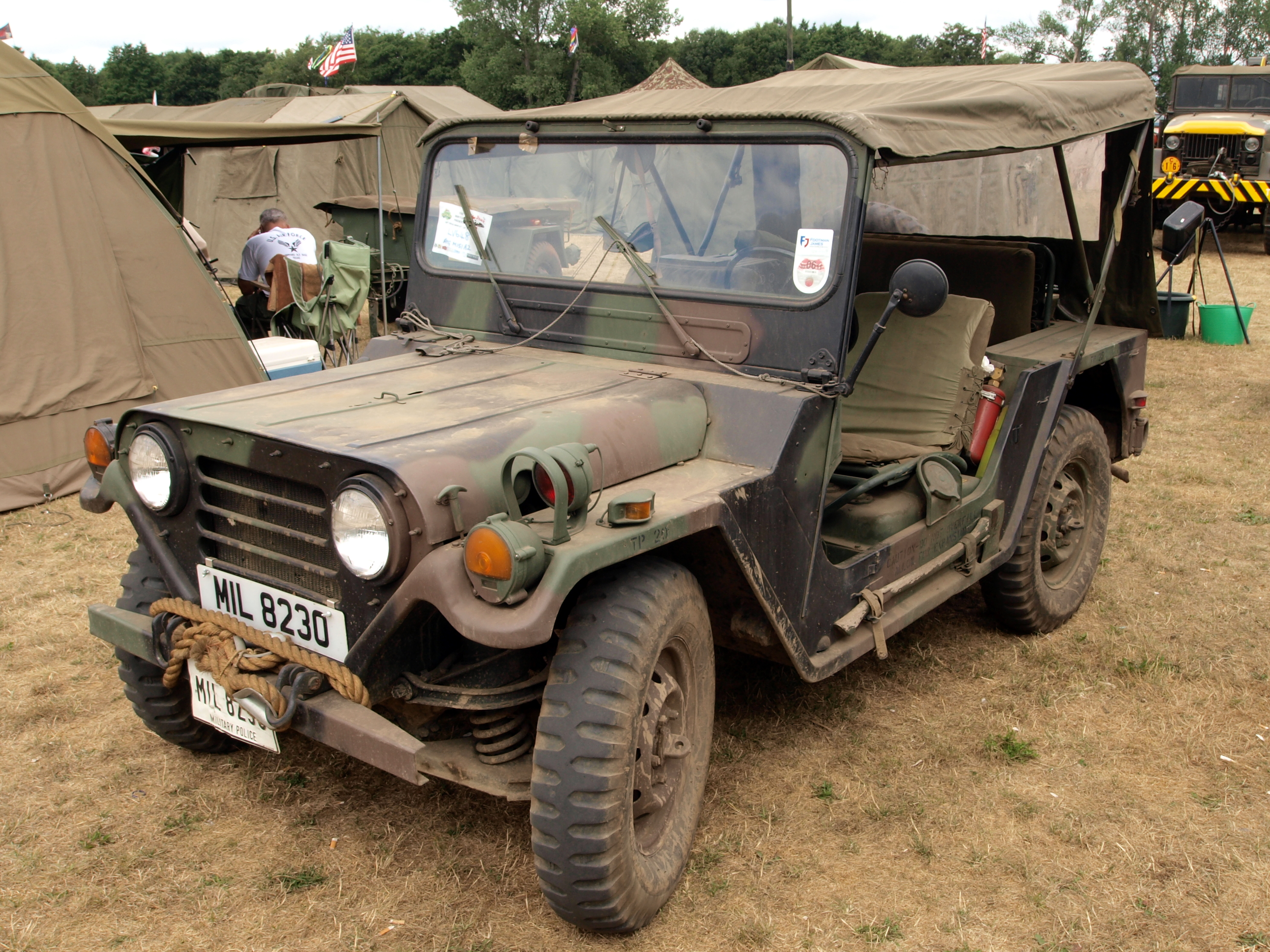
- The M151 A2, introduced in 1968

Overview
- Manufacturer: Ford, Kaiser, AM General
- Production: > 100,000
- Model years: 1959–1988 (Note: The last production of 1,000 units built for Pakistan (1988) at AM General and line dismantled.)

Body and chassis
- Class: ¼ ton truck/personnel transport, four wheel drive
- Body style: Jeep
- Layout: Front engine, 4WD
- Related: M422 "Mighty Mite" contemporary

Powertrain
- Engine: inline 4-cyl., 141.5 cu in (2.319 L); 71 hp (53 kW) at 4,000 rpm / 128 ft⋅lbf (174 N⋅m) at 1,800 rpm
- Transmission: 4-speed + reverse manual transmission single-speed, part-time transfer case

Dimensions
- Wheelbase: 85 in (2,160 mm)
- Length: 132.7 in (3,370 mm)
- Width: 64.3 in (1,630 mm)
- Height: 71 in (1,800 mm) with top up reducible to 53 in (1,350 mm)
- Curb weight: 2,400 lb (1,100 kg)

Chronology
- Predecessor: Willys M38A1
- Successor: AM General HMMWV

The M151, or officially: Truck, Utility, ¼-Ton, 4×4, was a light utility vehicle produced by multiple US manufacturers between 1959 and 1988. Operated primarily by the US military, it was the successor to the Korean War M38 and M38A1 Jeeps. Despite being a clean-sheet Ford Motor Company redesign, it almost completely retained the same vehicle concept, dimensions and weight. But contrary to all prior U.S. 1/4-ton jeeps, based on the 1941, World War II Willys designs, the M151 has a unitary body and frame, and pioneered replacing leaf-sprung rigid, live axles front and rear, with all-around independent suspension and coil springs. The M151's 4 in (10 cm) longer wheelbase, and 2 in (5.1 cm) wider body and tracks, combined with the benefits of an integrated body, offered more interior room, as well as a more planted stance, with greater side-slope stability.

During its decades long service-life, a considerable number of updates and variants were developed – both to deal with its rear suspension problems and provide for numerous special variants, spanning from field ambulance to weapons systems mounting a 106mm recoilless rifle or small nuclear missile. The M718 ambulance has a longer rear body, taller bows and canvas roof, and is wider from relocating the spare tire from the rear to outside on the passenger side, but rides on the same 85 in (2.16 m) wheelbase as the M151, contrary to its M170 jeep predecessor.

From 1985 into the early 1990s, the M151 and M718 have been replaced by the much larger, heavier, and much more expensive AM General HMMWV, both in most utility and logistics roles, as well as in (uparmored) frontline use. The HMMWV continued using all-wheel independent suspension, enhanced with geared hubs for much greater ground clearance, but reverted to a separate aluminium body on a steel chassis – the exact opposite of the contemporaneous new 1984 Jeep Cherokee models, where Jeep (formerly Willys) adopted unitary, integrated bodywork, but stuck with rigid, live axles.

With some M151A2 units still in U.S. military service in 1999, the M151 series achieved a longer run of service than that of the World War II / Korean War-era Willys MB/GPW, M38, and M38A1 series combined.

== History ==
In 1951 Ford Motor Company was awarded the contract to design a ¼-ton 4×4 truck to replace the M38 and M38A1 model jeeps. The M151 was developed to specifications and guidance of the U.S. Army's Ordnance Tank Automotive Command. Design started in 1951 and testing and prototyping lasted through most of the fifties. Although the M151 was developed and initially produced by Ford, production contracts for the M151A2 were later also awarded to Kaiser and AM General Corp, a subsidiary of AMC.

== Design ==
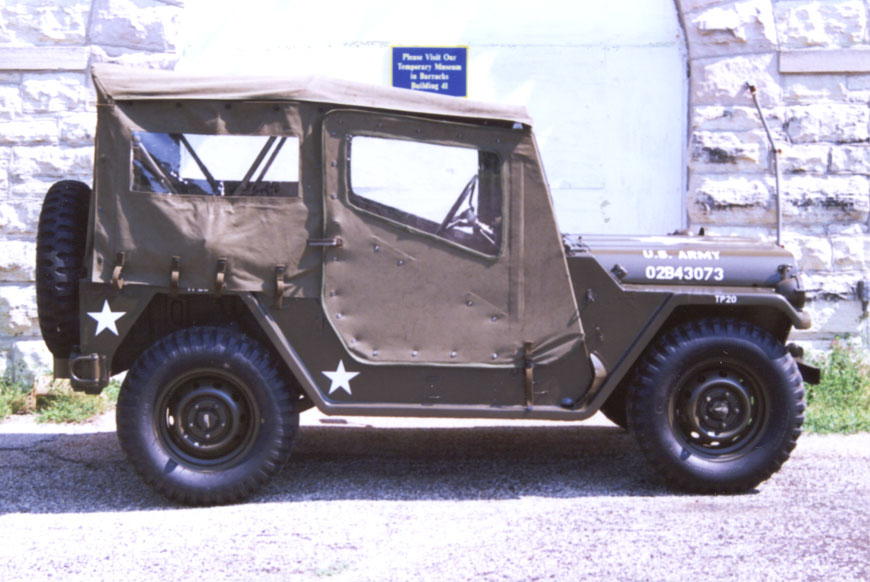
M151A2 with canvas top and doors

Although the M151 mostly retained the same basic layout and dimensions of its predecessors, it was for all intents and purposes a completely new design. Unlike previous jeep designs, whose structure consisted of a steel tub bolted onto a separate steel frame, the M151 utilized an integrated frame design, which integrated the box frame rails and the sheet-steel body into a unibody structure. Eliminating the separate frame gave the M151 slightly more ground clearance, while at the same time lowering the center of gravity. Although the vehicle's dimensions were only slightly enlarged — the 85 inch wheelbase was 4 inches longer than its predecessor, or 5 inches compared to the Willys MB, and the width was increased 3 inches — combined with the improved space efficiency of the integrated body design, the vehicle was a bit roomier than previous jeeps, while retaining the same light weight.

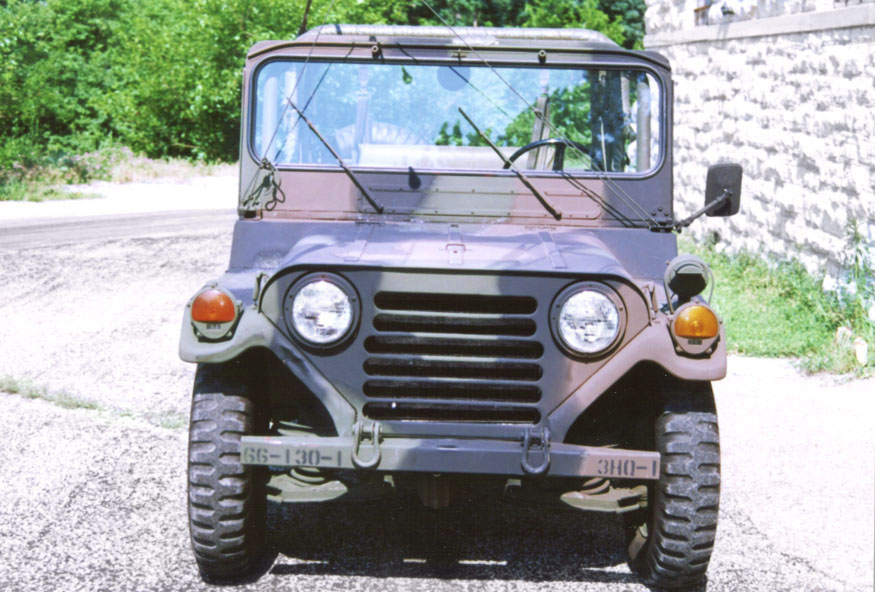
The front grille has horizontal slats

Another area improved upon in the M151 was the suspension. Dispensing with the rigid live axles in the front and rear that all previous military jeeps used (a layout still used on modern day Jeeps, such as the Jeep CJ and Wrangler), the M151 was instead equipped with independent suspension and coil springs. This made it capable of high-speed, cross-country travel, while boasting high maneuverability and agility. The new suspension also had the added benefit of providing a more comfortable ride.

Due to copyright and trademark issues, the M151 did not feature Jeep's distinctive seven vertical slot grille, instead, a horizontal grille was used.

== Handling problems ==
Unlike other military transports, such as the WWII and Korean War-era Jeeps and Dodge and Chevrolet transport trucks, the M151 was never widely released into the civilian market. This was partly because it did not meet federal highway safety standards for civilian vehicles, and because of a series of rollover accidents. While the high pivot rear swing axle geometry on the M151A1 was responsible for the rollovers, injuries and fatalities, the industry (Ford and the Army) claimed that they were primarily due to driver errors, with operators unprepared for the increased performance compared to the Jeeps, which it replaced. The swing axle rear design was prone to significant camber changes when subjected to cornering, resulting in the rear lifting, the inside wheel tucking under which often led to a vehicle rollover. Steering input as commonly found in a high-speed emergency avoidance maneuvers or hard cornering, was a recipe for disaster. The vehicle's tendency to lose control was reduced when there was weight in the rear, so drivers would often place an ammunition box filled with sand under the rear seat when no other load was being carried. The box could simply be emptied or abandoned when the extra weight was not needed. Recoilless rifle carrier models were especially prone to rollover accidents due to their stiffer rear springs and were typically subjected to severe speed restrictions any time the gun was not aboard.

Ford Motor Company designed the M151A1 beginning in 1951. By 1965 the world knew of the problems with swing axles (e.g. Unsafe at Any Speed by Ralph Nader). Nevertheless, when, in 1969, an automotive engineer at the Human Engineering Laboratory at Aberdeen Proving Ground wrote a report that included: 1) an analysis that showed the high pivot swing axle in the M151A1 was inherently unstable under cornering, 2) retrofits that had proven to solve the problem on Corvairs, VWs, and Formula Vees and, 3) ways of designing a replacement. The Director of the Human Engineering Lab rejected this report and when the solutions were forwarded to the Ford engineers they rejected them as well.

The handling issues were eventually resolved by a redesign of the rear suspension, introduced in the M151A2 model. However, due to liability concerns, the U.S. Department of Defense deemed all M151 series vehicles "unsafe for public highway use", limiting their public use. Continuing problems with vehicle roll-overs into the 1980s led the U.S. military to retrofit many M151 series vehicles with the "Roll over protection structure" (ROPS), a roll cage intended to protect both front and rear seat passengers.

== Service ==
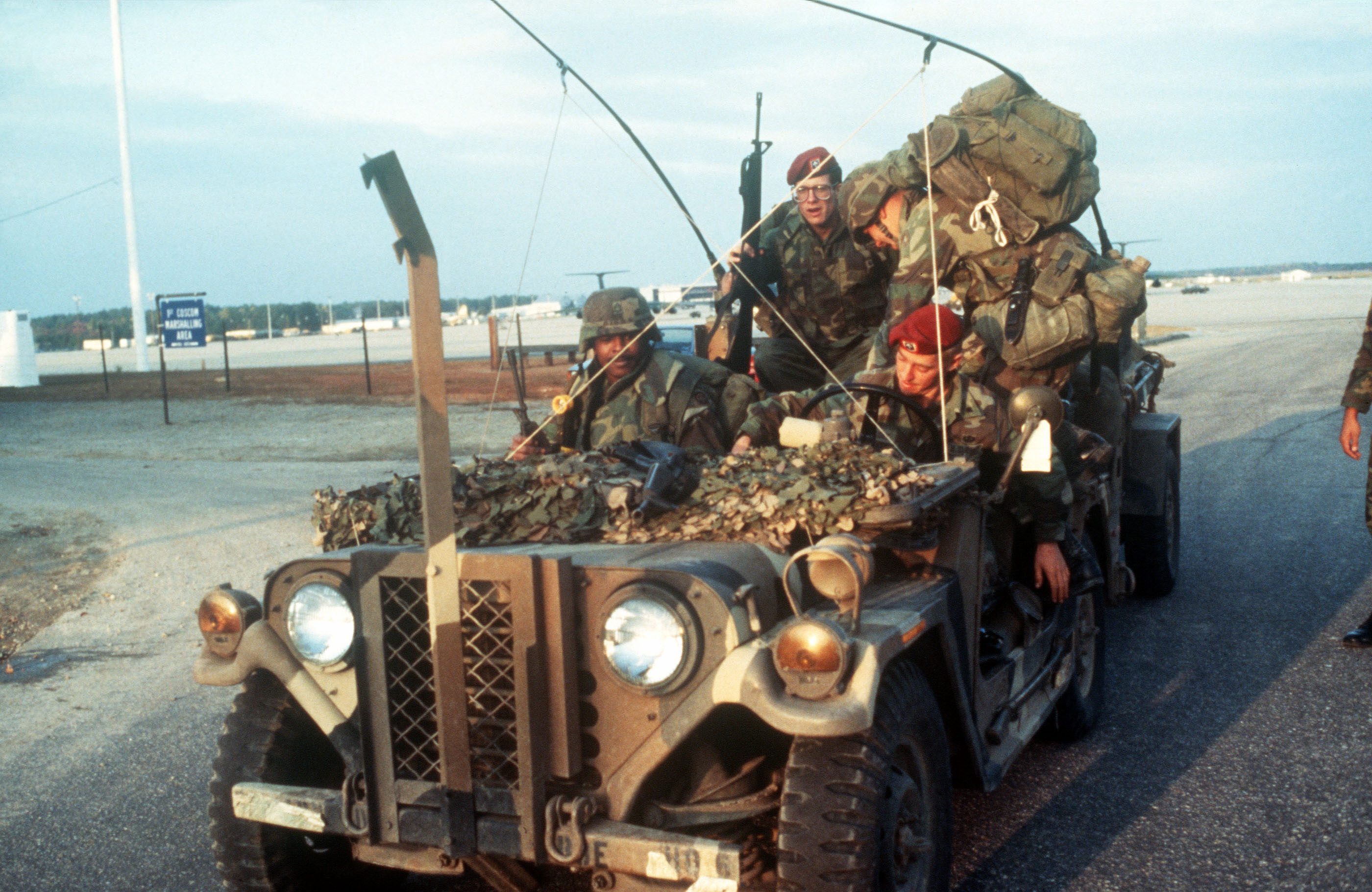
Soldiers of the 82nd Airborne Division in a heavily loaded M151 deployed in Grenada during Operation Urgent Fury in 1983

First put into service in the early 1960s, the M151 played an active part in US military operations well into the 1980s, when it was phased out in favor of the HMMWV. Various models of the M151 have seen successful military service in 15 different NATO countries and M151s were sold to many countries, including Canada, Denmark, the United Kingdom and non-NATO countries like Egypt, Lebanon, Israel, the Philippines, and Pakistan. Currently, the M151 is used by over 100 countries worldwide.

== Post-military use ==
In the late 1980s the M151s began being phased out of service in favor of the HMMWV. A few (perhaps 1,000) were sold via Government Surplus auctions, and those that were not sold via Foreign Military Sales (FMS) overseas were cut into four pieces and scrapped. However some individuals were able to buy these "quartered" M151s and simply weld the four sections back together, and rebuilt them into drivable condition. Some vehicles sold in the United States were simply cut in half, some of which were simply welded back together and driven. Additionally, beginning in the late 1990s a few companies dealing in military surplus items bought M151s from some of the foreign governments that received the vehicles via FMS for reconditioning and further sales.

== Variants ==
Variant models

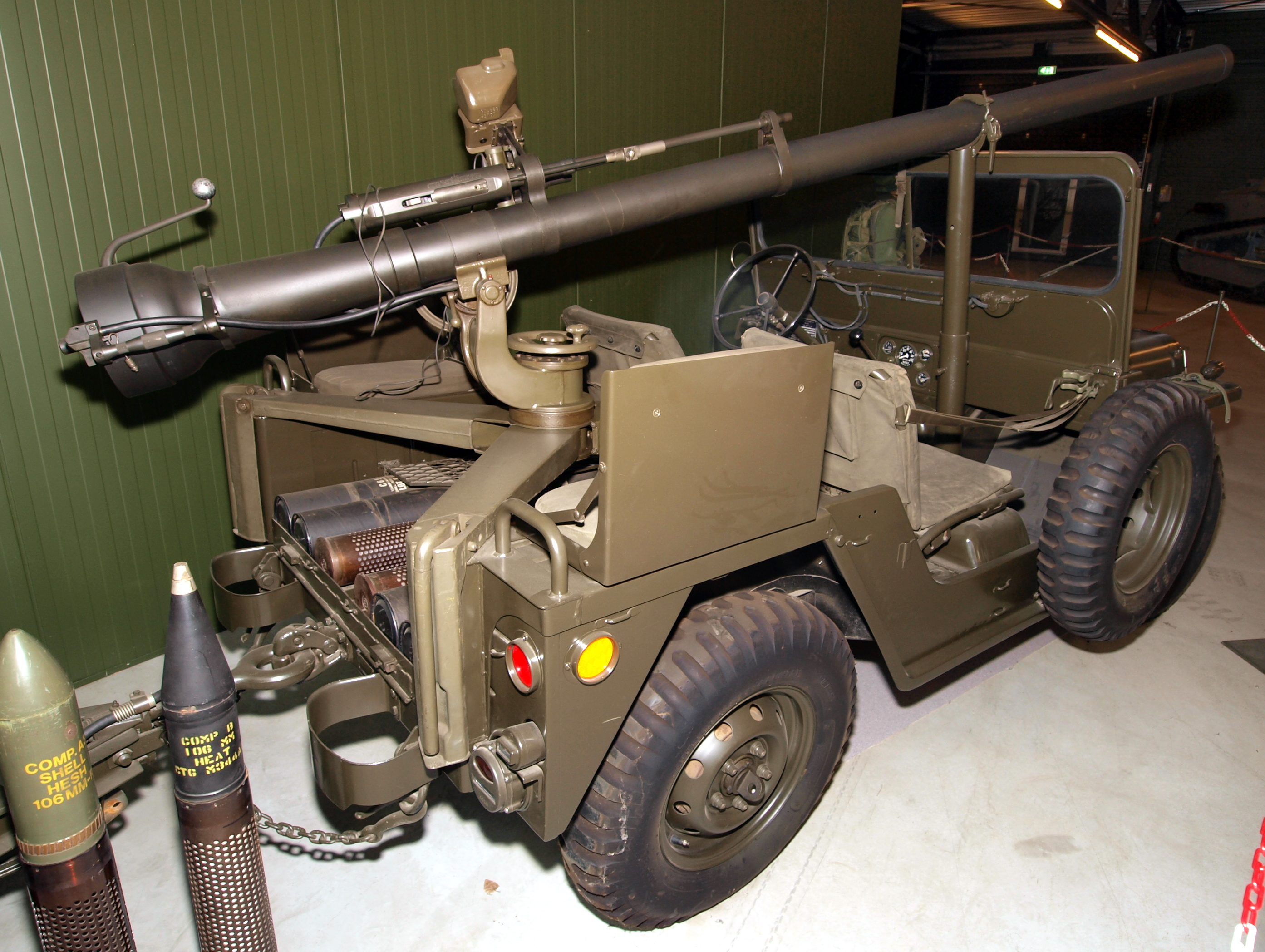
M151A1C with 106 mm recoilless rifle

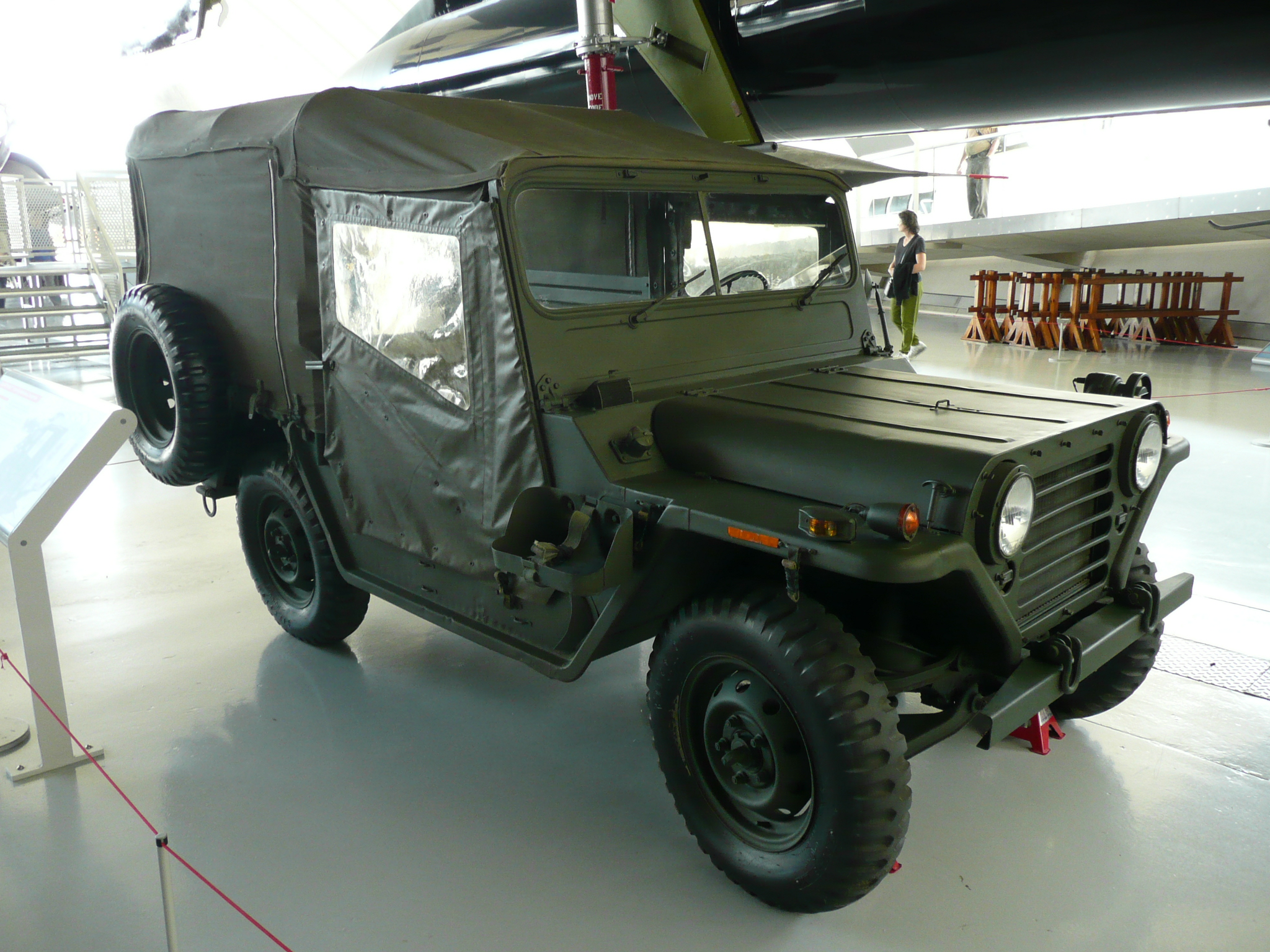
M718 Ambulance variant

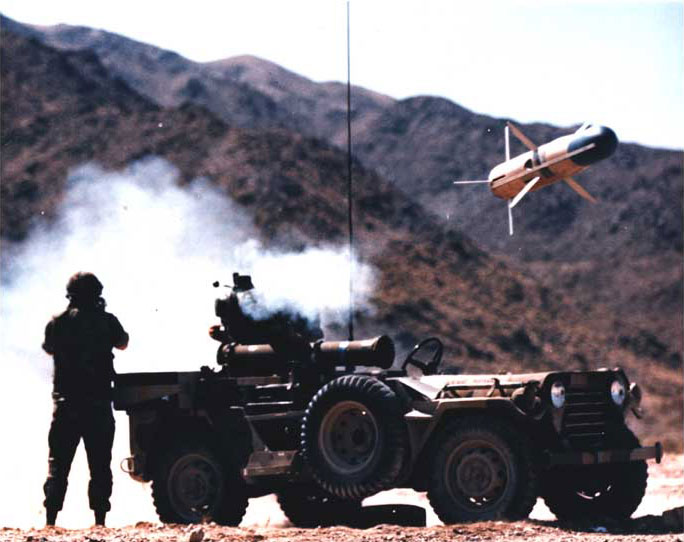
TOW missile being fired from M151A2

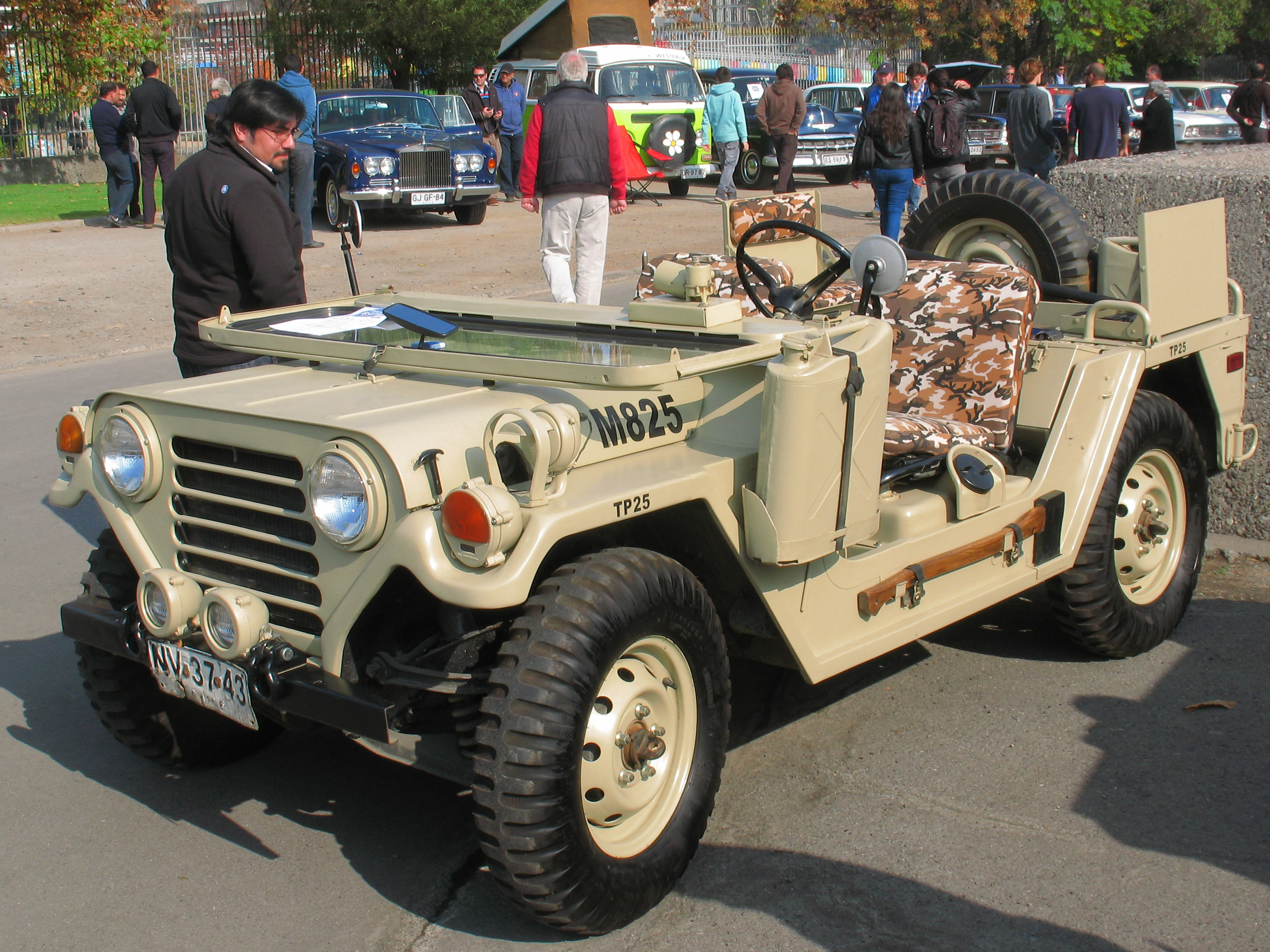
Ford M-825 (1971)

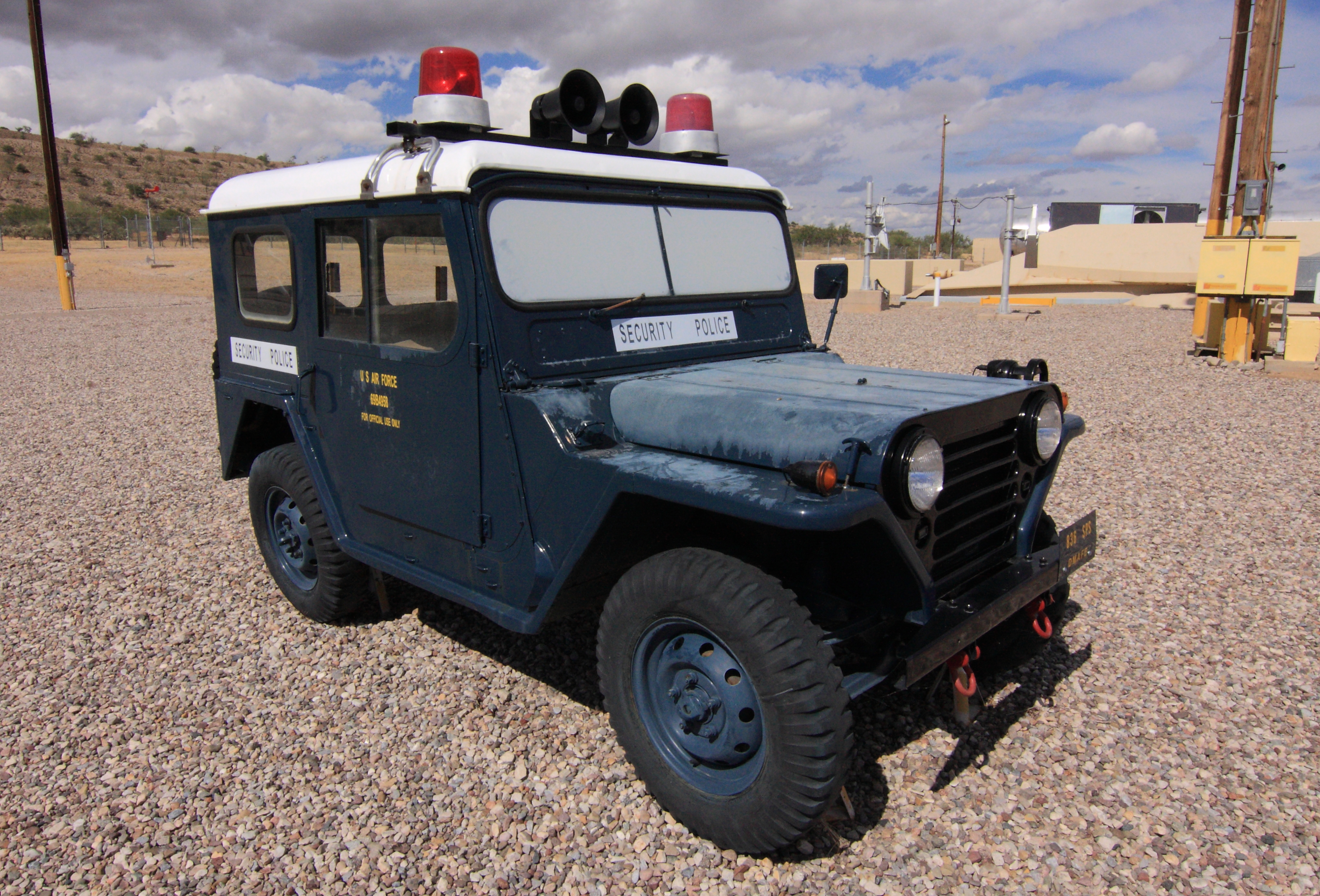
Rare hardtop model for United States Air Force Security Police

- M151 (1960) – Original, standard version of the clean-sheet, Ford designed, all new jeep. Because of its simple independent rear suspension, it had a dangerous tendency to flip over when cornered too aggressively by unaware drivers. The cheap swing-axle rear suspension design (like that of the original VW Beetle and Chevrolet Corvair), would result in large rear-wheel camber angle changes, and could cause drastic oversteer and a subsequent roll-over.
- M151A1 (1964) – Second version: minor changes in the rear suspension, mostly aimed at allowing the vehicle to carry heavier loads. Addition of turn signals to front fenders. The essentials of the rear suspension remained unchanged and the same applies to the handling problems in corners.
  - M151A1C – The M151A1C equipped with a 106 mm recoilless rifle on a pedestal-mount. Capable of carrying six rounds of ammunition and weapon tools. Including the driver, it provides space for two men and has a cruising range of 442 km or 275 miles.
  - M151A1D – Tactical nuclear variant. This was an M151A1C modified to mount the Davy Crockett Atomic Warhead Launcher (in parallel development with a similarly equipped M38A1 and other tactical vehicles).
  - M718 – Front-line ambulance variant with an extended rear body to enable the transport of wounded patients on litters. Crewed by two — a driver and a medic, it could carry three litters. Notably, although the M718 is larger than an M151 in all three dimensions – its greater length, width and height resulted from only minimal changes to the standard M151 design — retaining both the same wheelbase and track width unchanged. The spare wheel was moved from the rear to the side, to allow the rear body extensions, but also resulting in the increase in width. The ambulance "body" of the M718 consisted mostly just of taller bows, and a longer, taller, canvas top. The changes to the body and chassis, compared to the base M151 were remarkably minimal, considering its predecessor, the M170 jeep ambulance, had received a full 20 in (51 cm) wheelbase stretch from the base M38A1 jeep.
- M151A2 (1968) – The A2 fielded a significantly revised rear suspension featuring semi-trailing arms that greatly improved safety in fast cornering. Many smaller upgrades including improved turn signals. The A2 can be identified by the large combination turn signal/blackout lights on the front fenders, which also had been modified to mount the larger lights, as opposed to earlier A1's that had flat front fenders.
  - M151A2 TOW – tube-launched, optically tracked, wire-guided (TOW) anti-tank missile variant.
  - M718A1 – Front-line ambulance variant that featured an extended rear body to allow the transport of litters.
  - M825 – Variant with M40 106 mm recoilless rifle mounted on rear. It had racks in the cargo bed to carry 4 shells.
  - M1051 – Firefighting variant which saw exclusive use by the Marine Corps.
  - MRC108 – Forward Air Control variant, with multi-band communications equipment.
- Fast Attack Vehicles
  - M151A2 FAV – Fast Assault Vehicle variant designed to be carried inside a CH-53 helicopter. Modification mainly involves adding a combination radiator grille armor plate and spare tire carrier, a field radio bracket between the front seats, roll bars or roll-cage, and high-beam lights. It has a heavy weapons pedestal mount post mounted on the rear deck (capable of carrying a Browning M2HB, Mark 19 Automatic Grenade Launcher or TOW II Missile). The rear bustles had brackets to mount large storage baskets and the front bustles had brackets to mount small storage baskets for fuel jerry cans or single ammo boxes.
  - Marine FAV Mk I "Super Jeep": Fast Attack Vehicle. Models originally had a flat black paint job and a velcro-fastened cloth "blackout panel" that covered the dashboard gauges. The front-mounted roll bar, which replaced the front folding windshield, was made from threaded heavy-gauge pipe.
  - Marine FAV Mk II: Fast Attack Vehicle. Models originally had a MERDC "woodland" camouflage paint job and a welded roll-bar that was reinforced with two angled support braces of heavy-gauge welded pipe between the front seats. Had two high-beam lights mounted under the top of the rollbar. Highly customized by the units converting it, leading to numerous unique modifications.
  - Airborne FAV (AKA Ranger FAV): Fast Attack Vehicle for the 82nd Airborne Division. Has a forward-facing M60 GPMG or M240 MAG GPMG in a M32 45° weapons mount welded to the dashboard on the front passenger side, a horizontal storage box containing an AT-4 Anti-Tank Rocket, and a vertical storage rack behind the front seats that holds 8 to 10 M72 LAW Rockets. The rear bustles can mount locker baskets that can each contain 4 × M2/M2A1 ammo boxes for the main gun and the front bustles can contain single ammo boxes for the M60.
  - Air Force FAV: Has a roll cage and a 360° ring mount over the rear seat. Saw service with the MEUs and other Special Operations units.

== Users ==
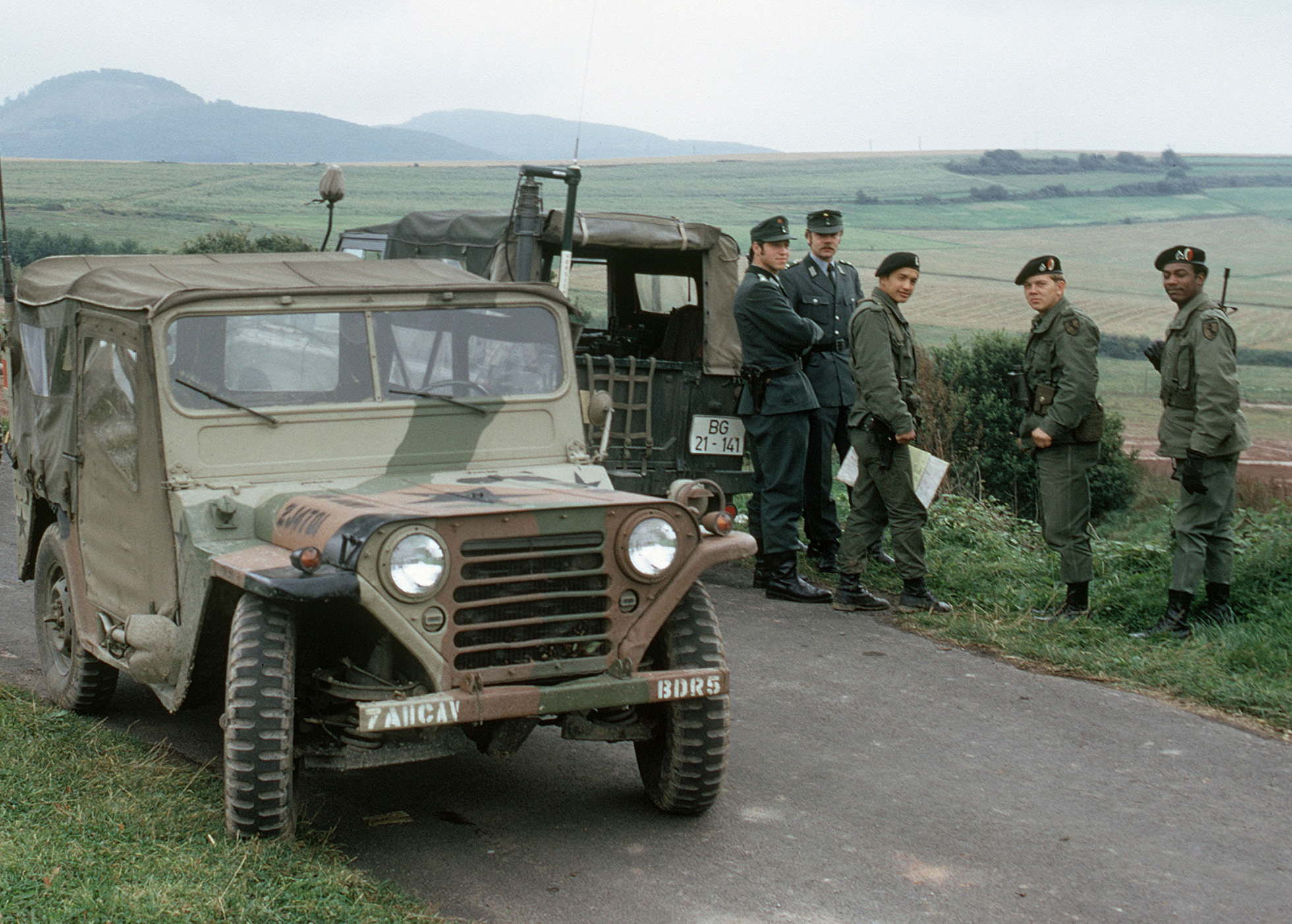
Group of three American soldiers of the 11th Armored Cavalry Regiment, their M151, and two West German Bundesgrenzschutz officers, 1979.

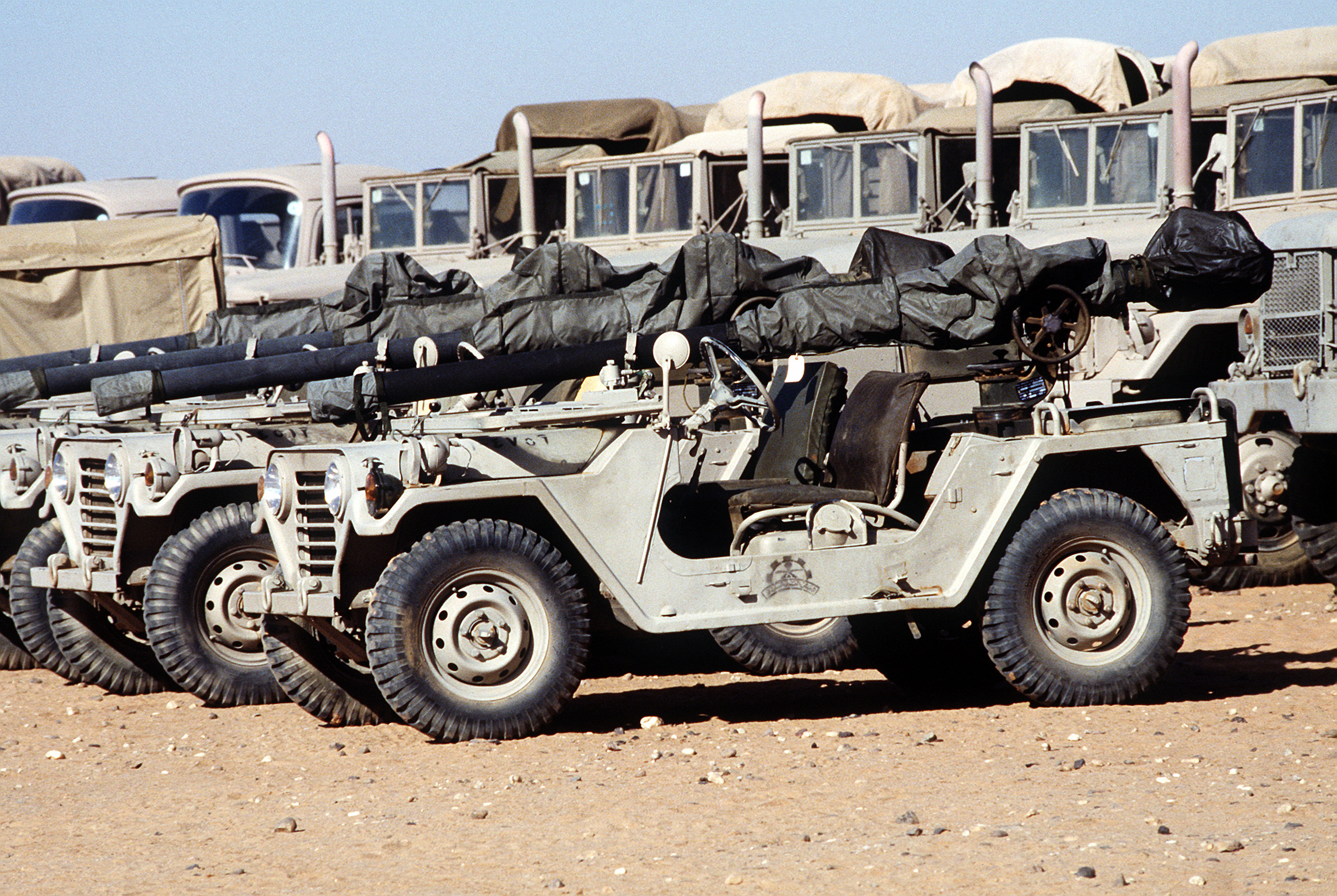
Saudi Arabia used M151s in the Gulf War of 1990-1991

- Argentina
- Bahrain
- Bolivia
- Brazil
- Cambodia
- Cameroon
- Canada
- Chad
- Chile
- Colombia
- Denmark
- Dominican Republic
- Egypt
- El Salvador
- Ethiopia
- Fiji
- France
- Ghana
- Greece
- Guatemala
- Honduras
- Indonesia
- Israel
- Jamaica
- Jordan
- Kuwait
- Laos
- Lebanon
- Liberia
- Libya
- Luxembourg
- Mexico
- Morocco
- Netherlands
- Pakistan
- Panama
- Paraguay
- Peru
- Philippines
- Portugal
- Saudi Arabia
- Senegal
- Singapore
- Somalia
- South Korea
- Spain
- Sudan
- Taiwan
- Thailand
- Tunisia
- Turkey
- United Kingdom
- United States
- Uruguay
- Venezuela
- Vietnam
- North Yemen
- Yemen
- Zaire

== Service history ==
- Vietnam War
- Laotian Civil War
- Guatemalan Civil War
- Dominican Civil War
- Cambodian Civil War
- Six-Day War
- Lebanese Civil War
- Western Sahara War
- Iran-Iraq War
- United States invasion of Grenada
- Thai–Laotian Border War
- Persian Gulf War
- Somali Civil War
- 2006 Lebanon War

== See also ==
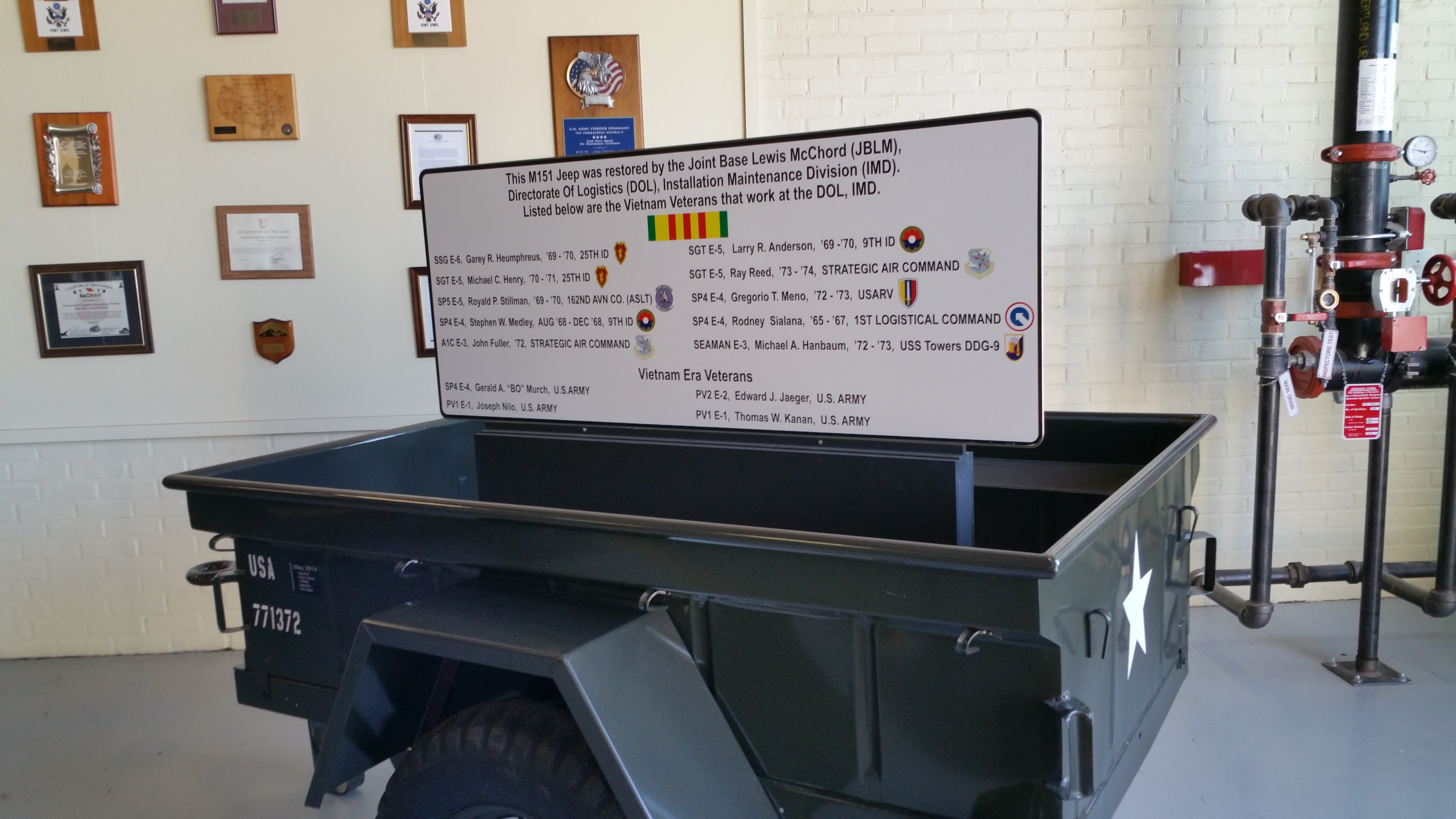
For the M151 jeep, there was a matching trailer: the ¼-ton M416

- FMC XR311
- G-numbers
- Jeep J8
- M416 trailer
- Willys FAMAE Corvo
- Austin Champ
- UAZ-469
