= List of currently active United States military land vehicles =

The following is a list of active United States military land vehicles grouped by type of land vehicle.

== Main battle tank ==
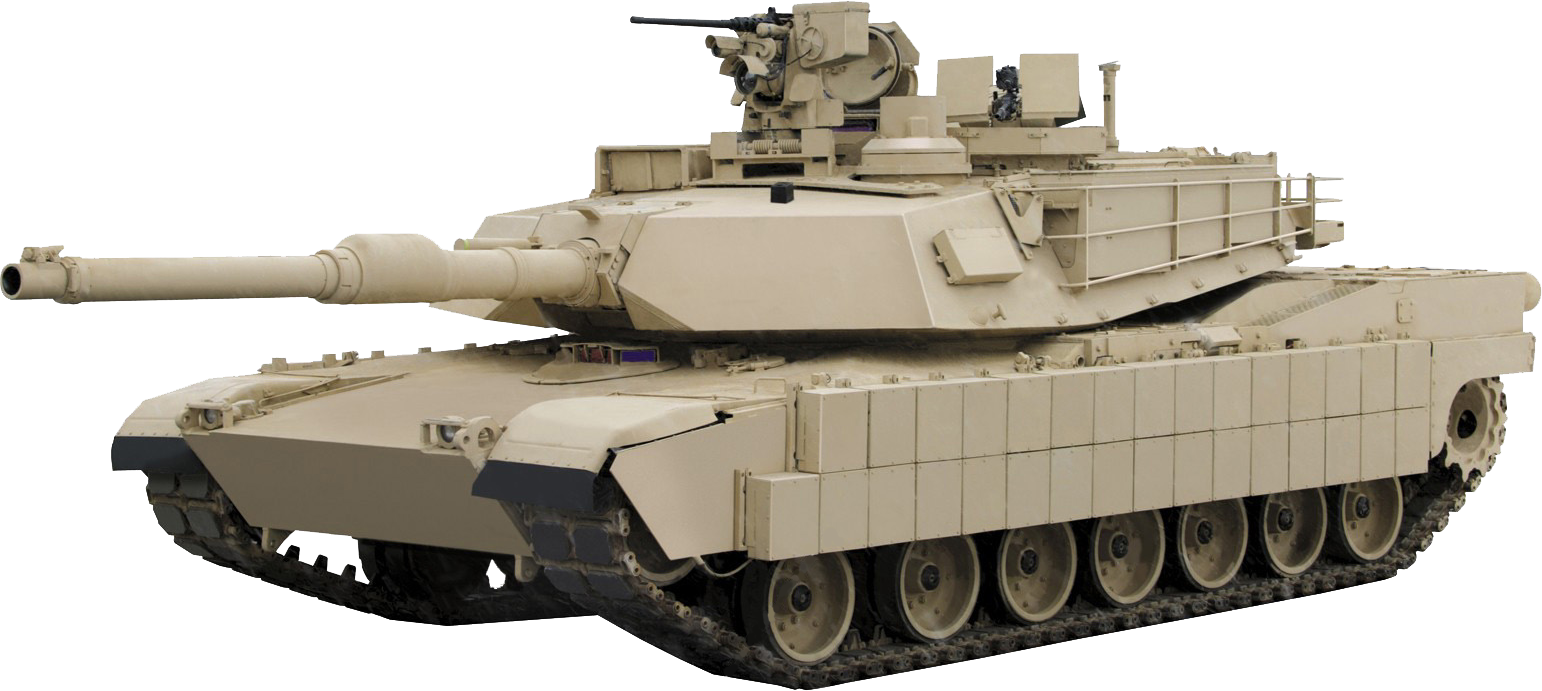
M1A2 Abrams main battle tank

- M1 Abrams – 5,000 active use. Approx. 3,600 stored.
  - M1A1 AIM.V2/SA
  - M1A2B and M1A2C
  - M1A2 SEP v3

== Assault gun ==
- M10 Booker

== Infantry fighting vehicles ==
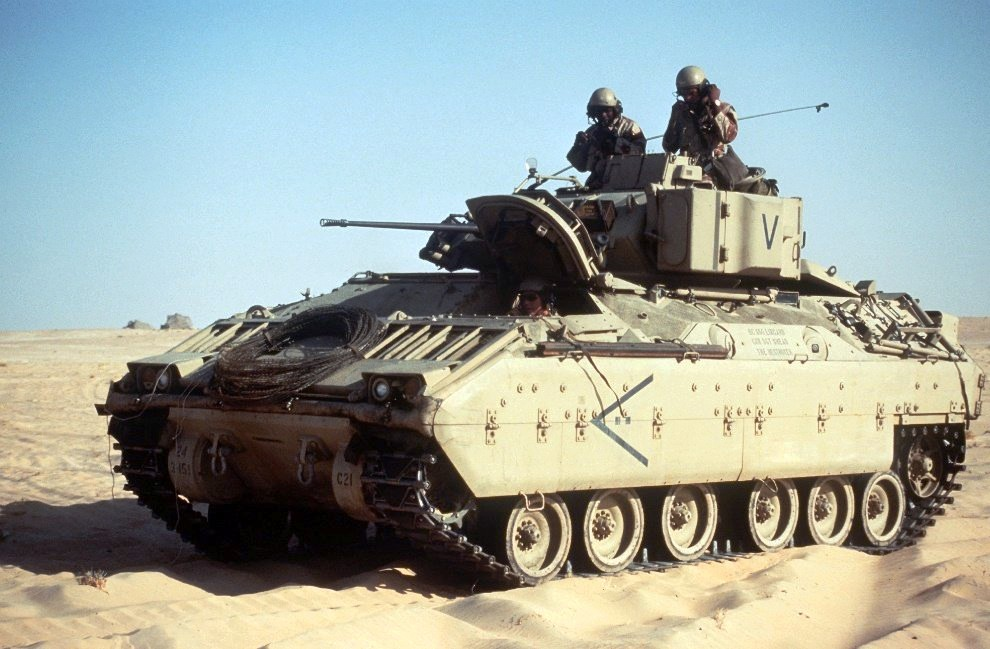
M2/M3 Bradley fighting vehicle

- Bradley fighting vehicle – 8,600 units.
  - M3A3 Bradley
  - M7 Bradley Fire Support Vehicle (B-FiST)
  - Bradley Engineer Squad Vehicle (ESV)
  - Bradley Battle Command Vehicle (BCV)

== Armored personnel carriers ==
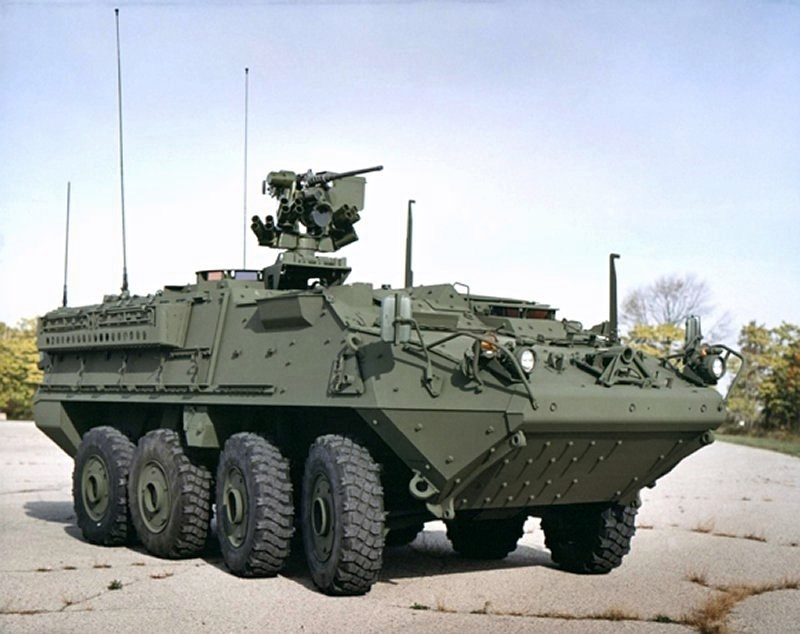
Stryker

- Stryker – 4,466 units.
  - M1126 infantry carrier vehicle (ICV) M1126 Stryker (IAV) has two variants, the infantry carrier vehicle (ICV) and the mobile gun system (MGS).
  - The (ICV) variant has eight additional configurations: mortar carrier (MC), reconnaissance vehicle (RV), commanders vehicle (CV), fire support vehicle (FSV), medical evacuation vehicle (MEV), engineer squad vehicle (ESV), anti-tank guided missile vehicle (ATGM), and NBC reconnaissance vehicle (NBCRV).
    - M1296 Dragoon – variant of the ICV with a 30 mm autocannon
  - M1283 AMPV
  - M1127 reconnaissance vehicle (RV)
  - M1129 mortar carrier (MC)
  - M1130 command vehicle (CV)
  - M1131 fire support vehicle (FSV)
  - M1132 engineer squad vehicle (ESV)
  - M1133 medical evacuation vehicle (MEV)
  - M1134 anti-tank guided missile vehicle (ATGMV)
  - M1135 nuclear, biological, chemical, reconnaissance vehicle (NBC RV)
- M113 armored personnel carrier – 6,000 units
  - M58 Wolf
  - M113A3 APC
  - M113 armored medical evacuation vehicle (AMEV)
  - M548A3 cargo carrier
  - M577A3 medical vehicle
  - M901A3 improved TOW vehicle (ITV)
  - M1059A3 Lynx smoke generator carrier (SGC)
  - M1064A3 mortar carrier
  - M1068A3 standard integrated command post system (SICPS) Carrier
- (AMPV) Armored Multi-Purpose Vehicle – 130 units
- LAV-25 – (light armored vehicle) – 870 units
  - LAV-25A2
  - LAV-AT (anti-tank)
  - LAV-M (mortar)
  - LAV-R (recovery)
  - LAV-C2 (command & control)
  - LAV-LOG (logistics)
  - LAV-MEWSS (mobile electronic warfare support system)
- Assault amphibious vehicle – 1,311 units
  - AAVP-7A1 (personnel)
  - AAVC-7A1 (command)
  - AAVR-7A1 (recovery)
- LARC-V (Light amphibious cargo) – 200 units
- Bison (armoured personnel carrier) – 12 units
- Pandur I – 50 units

== Armored combat support vehicles ==
- M1 assault breacher vehicle – 39 units.
- M4 Command and Control Vehicle (C2V) – 25 units.
- M9 armored combat earthmover – 447 units.
- M60A1 AVLB – 125 units.
- M88A2 Hercules
- M104 Wolverine – 44 units.

== Mine-protected vehicles ==
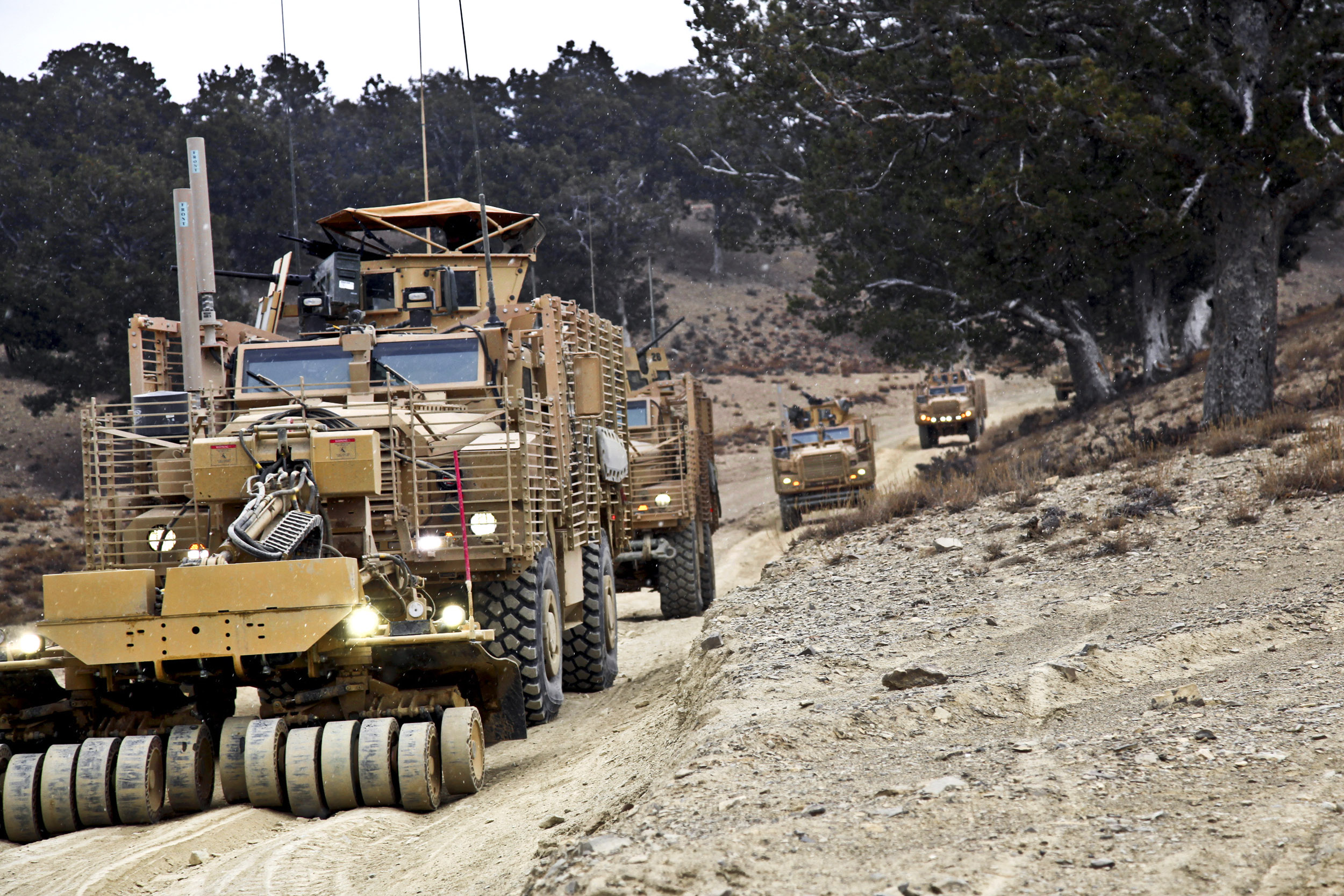
MRAP

- RG-31 –
- RG-33 – 1,735 units.
- Cougar – 3,500 units.
- International MaxxPro – 9,000 units.
- BAE Caiman – 2,800 units.
- Oshkosh M-ATV – 8,700 units.
- Buffalo – 200 units.
- JERRV
- Husky VMMD

== Light armored vehicles ==
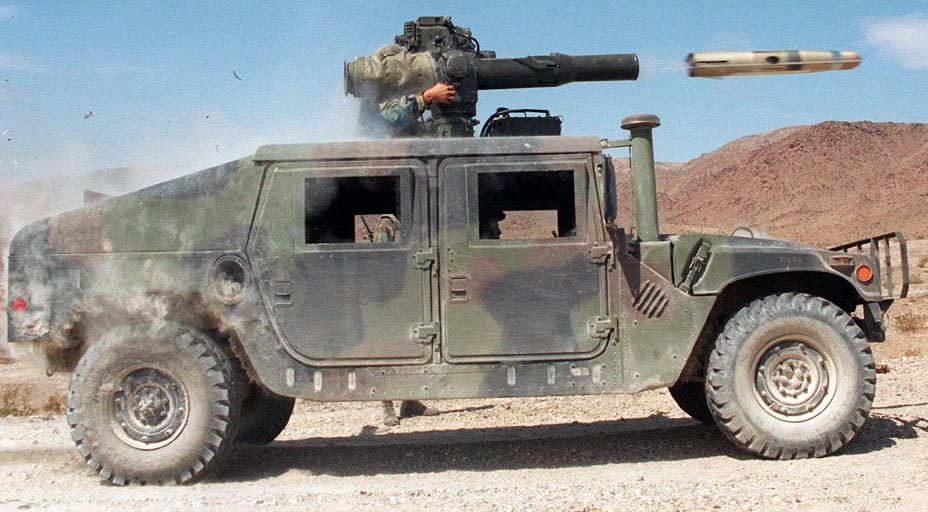
HMMWV

- Humvee – ≈160,000 units. (Note: In March 2012, AM General updated their old 'background' page from having built a total of 190,000 Humvees (in February 2012) to: "To date, more than 281,000 units [for the world] have been produced.")
  - M997A3 ambulance
  - M1097A2 unarmored cargo/troop/air-defense carrier
  - M1114 up-armored armament carrier
  - M1116 up-armored armament carrier
  - M1145 up-armored armament carrier
  - M1151 up-armored armament carrier
  - M1152A1 up-armored cargo/troop carrier
  - M1165A1 up-armored command and control carrier
  - M1167A1 up-armored TOW carrier
  - Ground Mobility Vehicle
- General Dynamics Flyer
- M1117 armored security vehicle – 1,836 units.
  - M1200 Armored Knight
  - JLTV

== Light utility vehicles ==
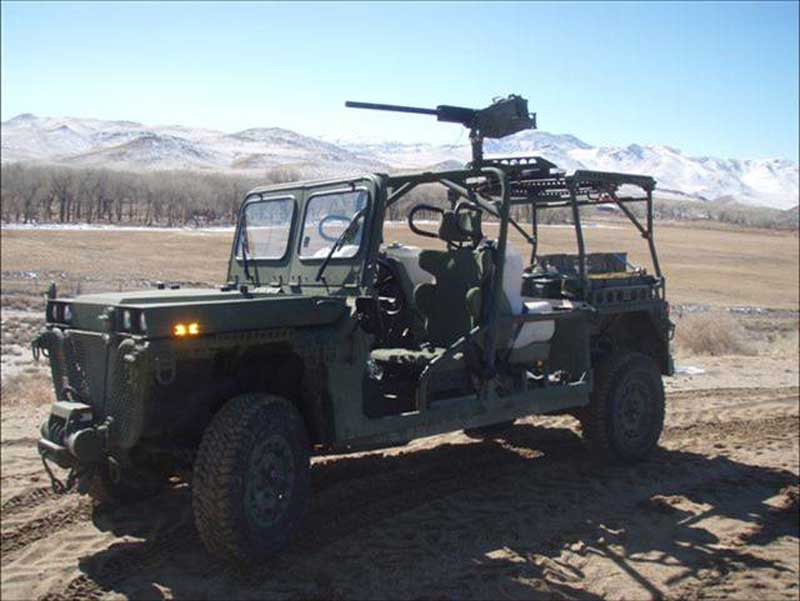
Growler

- Light Combat Tactical Utility Vehicle (L-ATV)
- M1297 Army Ground Mobility Vehicle (AGMV)
- Ranger Special Operations Vehicle
- Guardian Angel Air-Deployable Rescue Vehicle
- M1161 Light Strike Vehicle (LSV)
  - M1163 Expeditionary Fire Support System (EFSS) Prime Mover
- MRZR-D (USMC)
- M1301 Infantry Squad Vehicle - 649 units on order

== Construction/engineering equipment ==
=== Earthmoving equipment ===
- Excavator
  - Caterpillar 320
  - John Deere 200C/200D/210G
- Backhoe
  - Caterpillar 420D
- Bulldozer
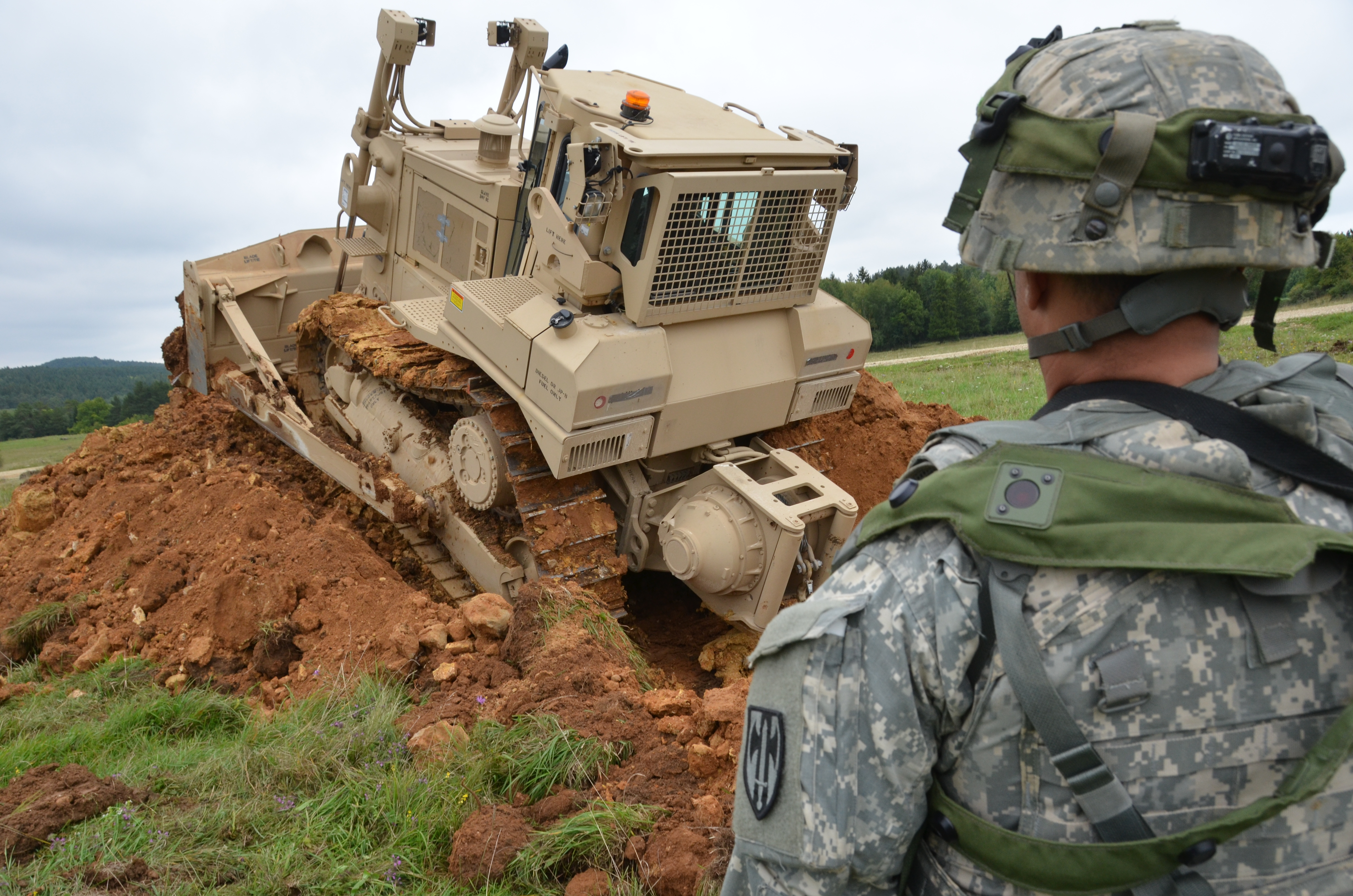
  - US Army Caterpillar D7R Bulldozer
    Caterpillar D6K
  - Caterpillar M105 Deployable Universal Combat Earthmover (DEUCE)
  - John Deere 850J R Medium Crawler Tractor (MCT)
    - US Marines
  - Caterpillar D7R
    - US Navy/Army Use
  - Caterpillar D9
- Loader
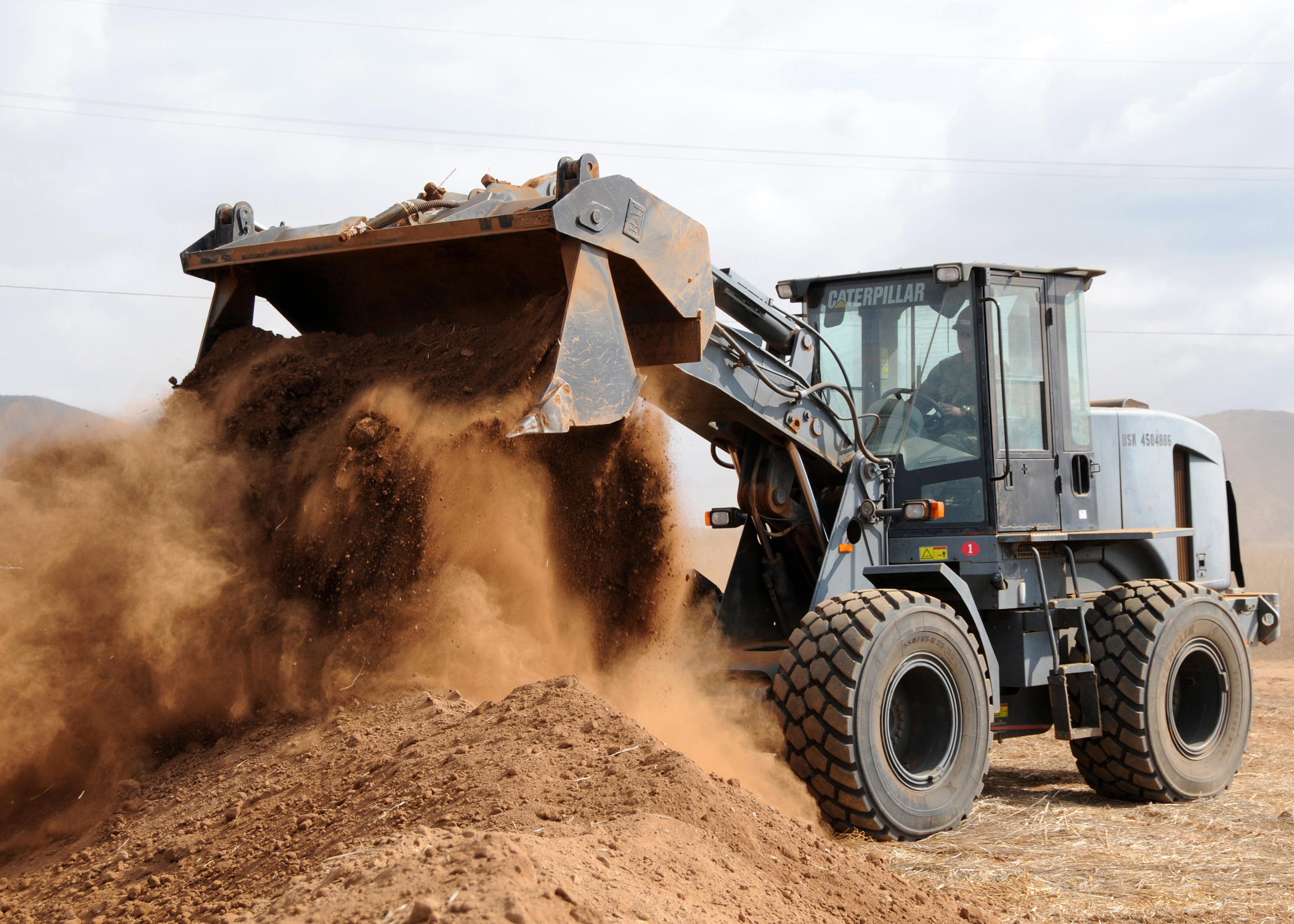
  US Navy Caterpillar 924H Wheel Loader
  - Case/Caterpillar Skidsteer Loaders
  - John Deere 624J/K R TRACTOR, RUBBER TIRED, ARTICULATED STEERING, MULTIPURPOSE (TRAM)
    - US Marines
  - Caterpillar 924H Wheel Loader
  - Caterpillar 966H Wheel Loader
  - Caterpillar 963 Crawler Loader
- Grader
  - Caterpillar 140
- Wheel tractor-scraper
  - Caterpillar 621

=== Material handling/lifting equipment ===
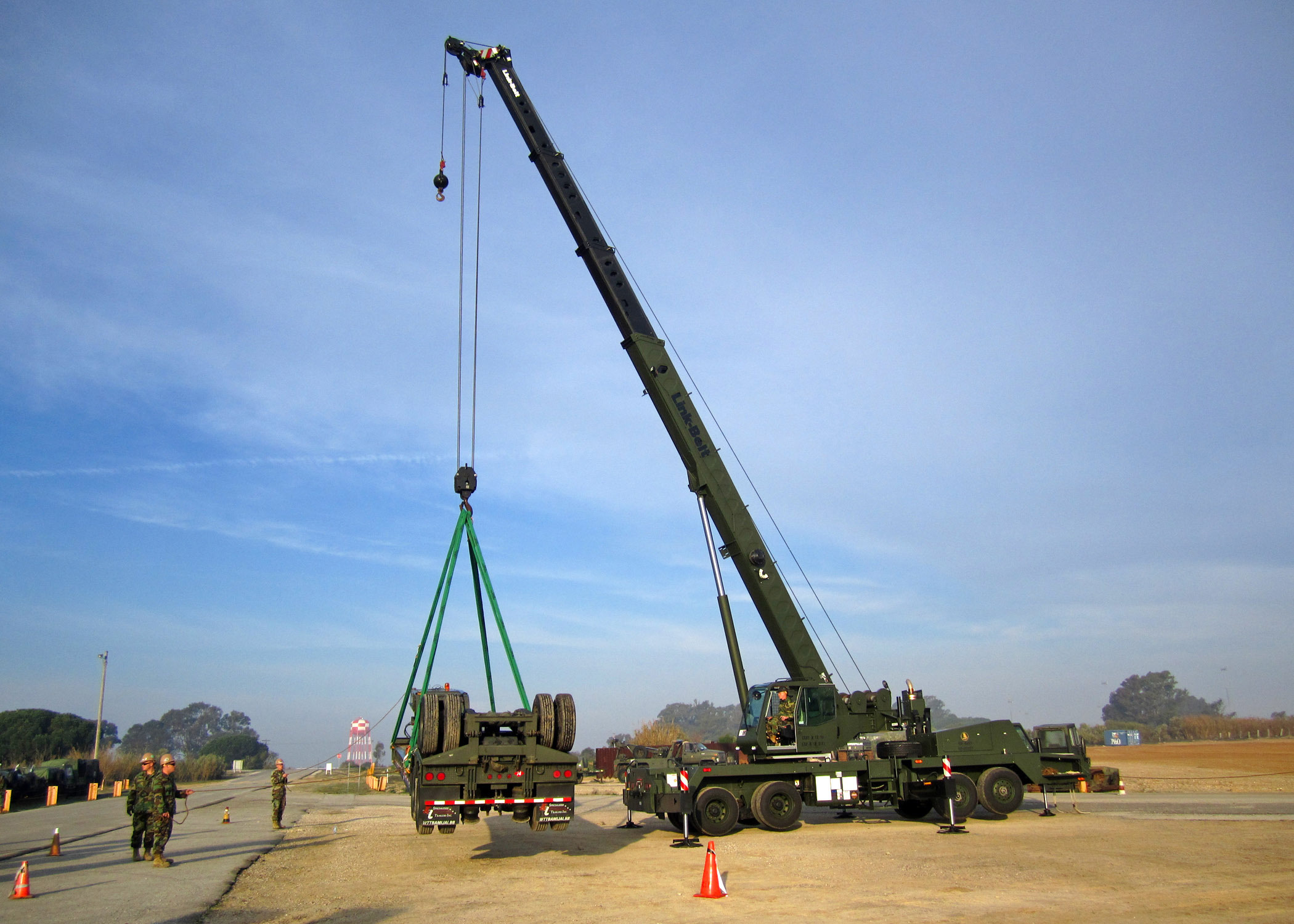
US Navy Linkbelt truck crane

- Mobile Crane
  - Linkbelt 108H Crawler Crane
  - Manitowoc 777 Crawler Crane
  - Linkbelt HTC-8640 Mobile Crane
  - Terex MAC-50 All-Terrain Crane
    - In service with US Marines
    - Entered Service 2007, refurbished by Taylor Machine Works beginning in 2018.
    - Replaced the legacy P&H HSHMC-25
  - Grove GMK4060HC All-Terrain Crane
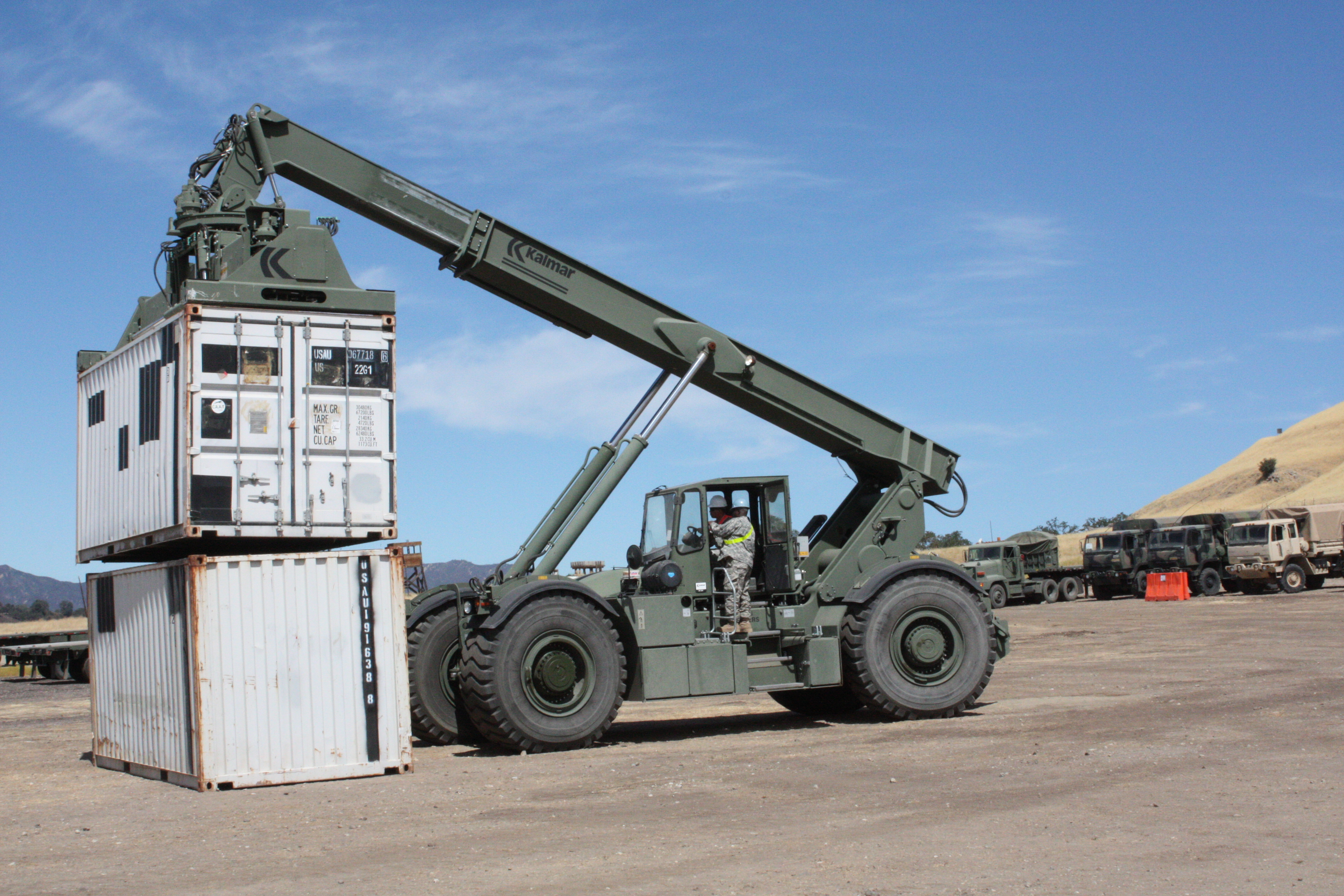
- Kalmar RT240 RTCH
  Material/Container Handlers
  - JLG Atlas II Telehandler
  - Oshkosh (JLG) EBFL EXTENDED BOOM FORKLIFT
  - Caterpillar 930K ATFL (10K/13K)
  - Kalmar RT240 Rough Terrain Container Handler (RTCH)

== Self-propelled artillery ==
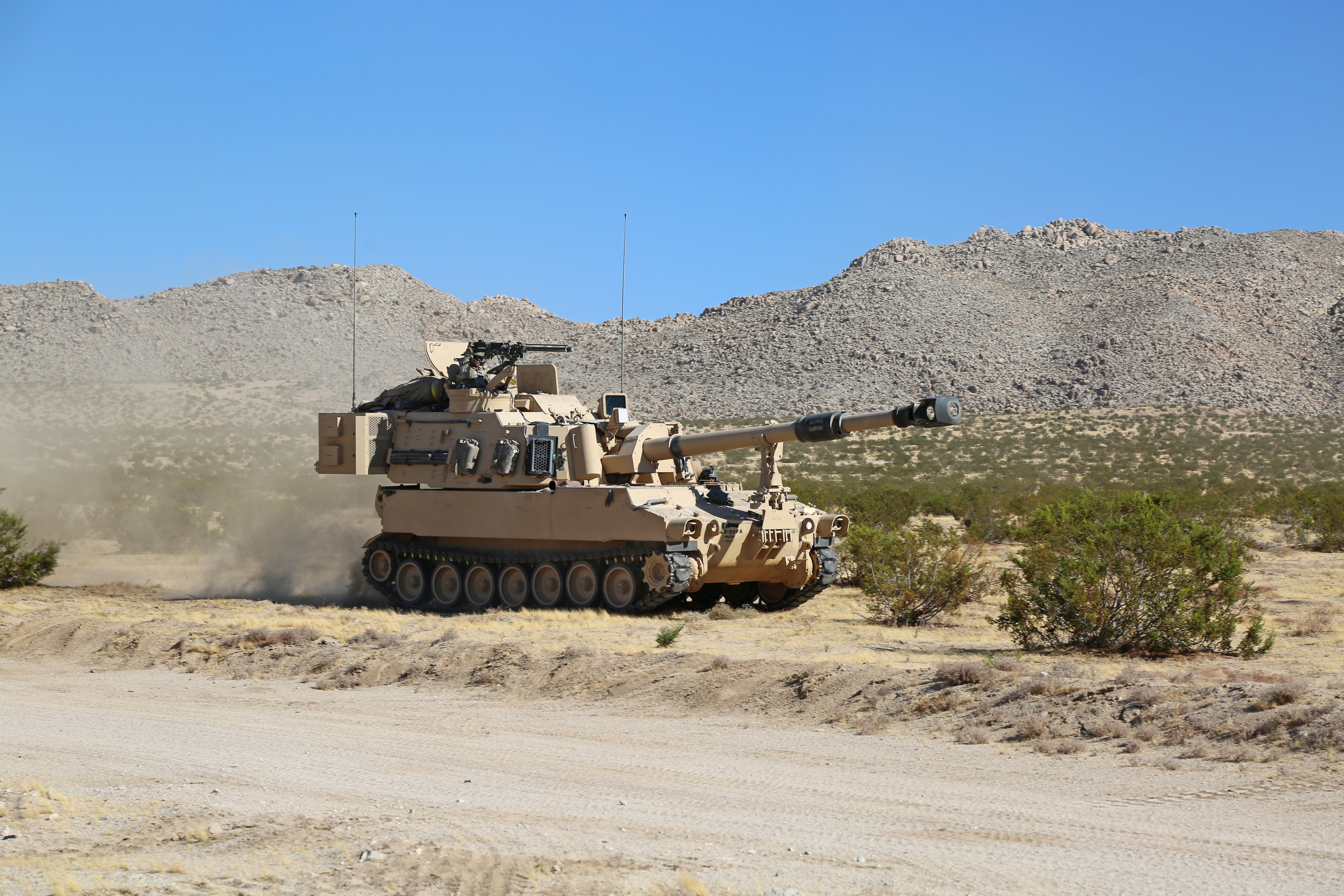
- M109A6 Paladin – 850 units.

(155 mm howitzer motor carriage; full-track)

- M142 HIMARS – 500 units.
- M270A1 MLRS – 991 units.

== Anti-aircraft ==
- M1097 Avenger – 1,400 units.
- Stryker M-SHORAD – 120 units.
- Terminal High Altitude Area Defense – 7 Battery units.
- MIM-104 Patriot – 483 units.
- Ground-Based Midcourse Defense - 64 units.
- NASAMS - unknown units.

== Prime movers and trucks ==
- Medium Tactical Vehicle Replacement – 7,500 units.
- Heavy Equipment Transport System
- M35 2½ ton cargo truck
- M939 Truck – 32,000 units.
- M970
- Family of Medium Tactical Vehicles – 80,000 units.
- Heavy Expanded Mobility Tactical Truck – 13,000 units.
- Logistics Vehicle System
- Palletized Load System
- Commercial Utility Cargo Vehicle
- R-11 Refueler
- Gun Truck
- Oshkosh M1070

== Miscellaneous ==
- M-Gator
- M973 (carrier, cargo) small unit support vehicle (SUSV)
  - M1065 (carrier, command post)
  - M1066 (carrier, ambulance)
  - M1067 (carrier, cargo) (flatbed)
- M1030M1 Motorcycle
- Forklift truck
- Oshkosh Striker
- Rhino Runner
- Mamba APC
- Wiesel 1 – 7 units.
- Ford F-Series
- Chevy Tahoe
- Dragon Runner
- iRobot 510 Packbot
- XM1216 small unmanned ground vehicle
- iRobot 110 FirstLook
- iRobot 710 Warrior
- Foster-Miller TALON
- MARCbot IV
- Remotec ANDROS
- iRobot R-Gator
- Squad Mission Support System (SMSS)
- M160

== Experimental vehicles ==
- Amphibious combat vehicle (ACV)
- XM30 Mechanized Infantry Combat Vehicle (OMFV program replace the M2 Bradley)
- M5 Ripsaw (vehicle robot)
- Multi-Mission Launcher (indirect fire protection capability increment 2-intercept)
- Long-range hypersonic weapon (intermediate-range conventional prompt strike (IRCPS)
- Integrated Air and Missile Defense (IAMD)
- Project Pele (mobile microreactor)

== See also ==
- Currently active military equipment by country
- Vehicle registration plates of the United States Army in Germany
- M-numbers
- List of land vehicles of the U.S. Armed Forces
- List of crew-served weapons of the U.S. Armed Forces
- List of vehicles of the United States Marine Corps
- List of weapons of the U.S. Marine Corps
