= List of land vehicles of the United States Armed Forces =

Land vehicles by type and current level of use.

== Light tanks ==
=== Out of service ===
- M1917
- M1 combat car
- Light tank M2
- Light tank M3/M5
- Light tank (airborne) M22
- Light tank M24
- M41/A1/A2/A3 Walker Bulldog
- M551/A1 Sheridan (armored reconnaissance airborne assault vehicle)
- T7 combat car

=== Experimental (suspended/cancelled/completed) ===
- XM8 armored gun system
- T92
- HSTV-L

== Medium tanks ==
=== Out of service ===
- M2 medium tank
- Medium tank M3 Lee/Grant (all models)
- Medium tank M4 Sherman (all models)
- M46 Patton
- M47 Patton
- M48A1/A2/A3/A5 Patton
- M48A4

=== Experimental ===
- T20 medium tank
- T22 medium tank
- T23 medium tank

== Heavy tanks ==
=== Out of service ===
- Heavy tank M26 Pershing
- Heavy tank M103

=== Experimental (Cancelled) ===
- Heavy tank T1/M6
- Super-Heavy tank T28 (T95 GMC)

Super Heavy T33 (T33-7 HMC

== Main battle tanks ==
=== In active service ===
- M1A1D/M1A2/M1A2 SEP Abrams
- M1A1HA Abrams

=== Out of service ===
- M60A1/A3 TTS Patton Tank (including RISE and RISE Passive vehicles)
- M1/IPM1/M1A1 Abrams (M1A1 used for reserve training)

=== Experimental (suspended/cancelled/completed) ===
- M60A1E1/E2/A2
- XM1202 MCS
- MBT-70

== Armored cars ==
=== Out of service ===
- Jeffery armored car
- M1 armored car
- M3 scout car
- M8 Greyhound
- M38 Wolfhound
- T7 armored car
- XM706 (wheeled)
- XM706E1/M706 (wheeled)
- XM706E2 (wheeled)

=== In service ===
- M1117 armored security vehicle
- MRAP

=== Experimental (active) ===
- ULTRA AP

=== Experimental (suspended/cancelled/completed) ===
- XM800 armored reconnaissance scout vehicle

== Armored personnel carriers, reconnaissance and fighting vehicles ==
=== Out of service ===
- M2 half-track car
- M3 half-track
- M5 half-track
- M9 half-track
- M59 (APC)
- M75 (APC)
- M114/A1 (full-track)

=== In active service ===
- M113 armored personnel carrier
- M2 Bradley (infantry fighting vehicle)
- Stryker interim armored (fighting) vehicle
- LAV-25 armored reconnaissance vehicle

== Landing vehicles, tracked ==
- LVT(1) (G-156)
- LVT(2) (G-167)
- LVT(A)(1) (G-214) (Armored with 37 mm gun)
- LVT(A)(2) (G-168) (Armored)
- LVT(A)(4) (armored with 75 mm howitzer)
- LVT(A)(5) (armored with 75 mm howitzer)
- LVTP5
- LVTH6 (with 105 mm howitzer)
- LVTR1 (recovery vehicle)
- LVTE1 (engineer vehicle)
- LVTP7 (later AAV7)

== Dedicated anti-armor vehicles ==
=== Out of service ===
- 75 mm gun motor carriage M3 (T12)
- M6 Fargo
- M10 tank destroyer
- M18 Hellcat
- M36 (tank destroyer)
- T48 gun motor carriage
- M901 improved tow vehicle

== Specialist armored vehicles ==
=== In active service ===
- M1074 Joint Assault Bridge System
- M104 Wolverine (armored bridge layer)
- M9 armored combat earthmover
- M60A1 armored vehicle-launched bridge (AVLB)
- M88 recovery vehicle
- M578 light recovery vehicle
- M728 combat engineer vehicle (CEV)
- M1150 Assault Breacher Vehicle
- M981 FISTV
- M93 Fox NBCRS (nuclear–biological–chemical reconnaissance system)

== Utility vehicles ==
=== Out of service ===
- FWD Model B
- Gama Goat
- GMC CCKW
- Jeffery Quad
- M29 Weasel
- M39 truck
- M151
- Mack AC
- Willys MB
- Willys M38
- Ford GTB
- Dodge M37
- M520 Goer
- M25 tank transporter
- Interim Fast Attack Vehicle

=== In active service ===
- M939 truck
- Humvee
- FMTV
- MTVR
- L-ATV (Oshkosh Defense's JLTV winner (August 2015); manufactured unarmoured; Long Term Armor Strategy (LTAS) complaint (A-kit/B-kit))

=== Experimental ===
- FMC XR311 (also known as GI Hotrod)

== Self-propelled guns and artillery ==
=== In active service ===
- M109A6/A7 Paladin (155 mm howitzer motor carriage; full-track)
- M270 multiple launch rocket system
- High mobility artillery rocket system

=== Out of service ===
- M109/A1/A2/A3/A4/A5 (155 mm howitzer motor carriage; Full-Track); (M109A5 used for reserve training)
- M108 (105 mm howitzer)
- M107 (175 mm howitzer)
- M110/A1/A2 (203 mm howitzer)
- 76 mm gun motor carriage M10 (3"/76 mm gun motor carriage; full-track)
- 76 mm gun motor carriage M18 Hellcat (76 mm gun motor carriage; full-track)
- 90 mm gun motor carriage M36 Jackson (90 mm gun motor carriage; full-track)
- Landing Vehicle Tracked (armored) (LVT(A))1/2/4/5 (amphibious full-track)
- 81 mm mortar carrier M4/A1
- M21 mortar carrier
- T19 howitzer motor carriage
- T30 howitzer motor carriage

=== Experimental ===
- XM2001 Crusader self-propelled howitzer

== Mine-resistant ambush-protected (MRAP) ==
- M1117 armored security vehicle
- Buffalo
- Caiman
- Cougar
- M-ATV (MRAP all-terrain vehicle)
- MaxxPro
- RG-31
- RG-33

== Specialized vehicles ==
- LSV (light strike vehicle)
- ATV (MV700, MV850)
- Desert Patrol Vehicle (still in use in small numbers by Navy SEALs)

== See also ==
- Vehicle registration plates of the United States Army in Germany
- Tank classification
- List of "M" series military vehicles
- List of currently active United States military land vehicles
- List of crew served weapons of the US Armed Forces
- List of vehicles of the United States Marine Corps
- List of weapons of the U.S. Marine Corps
- G-numbers
