= R11 =

R11, R-11, Meaning R11 - Rhyll Anthony, R11.ID

== Automobiles ==
- BMW R 11, a German motorcycle
- R-11 Refueler a military truck of the United States Air Force
- Renault 11, a French family car

== Vessels ==
- HMS R11, a submarine of the Royal Navy
- HMS Tumult (R11), a destroyer of the Royal Navy
- INS Vikrant (1961), an aircraft carrier of the Indian Navy decommissioned in 1997
- INS Vikrant (2013), an aircraft carrier of the Indian Navy commissioned in 2022
- Spanish aircraft carrier Príncipe de Asturias (R11)
- USS R-11 (SS-88), a submarine of the United States Navy

== Other uses ==
- R11 (New York City Subway car)
- R11 (Rodalies de Catalunya), a regional rail line in Catalonia, Spain
- Caudron R.11, a French biplane fighter
- R11: Highly flammable, a risk phrase
- R-11 regional road (Montenegro)
- R-11 Zemlya, a Soviet tactical ballistic missile
- Oppo R11, a smartphone
- Remington R11 RSASS, an American semi-automatic rifle
- Small nucleolar RNA R11/Z151
- Trichlorofluoromethane, a chlorofluorocarbon used as a refrigerant
- Tumansky R-11, a Soviet turbojet engine
- Umbundu, a Bantu language of Angola
