= M1200 Armored Knight =

US armored reconnaissance vehicle

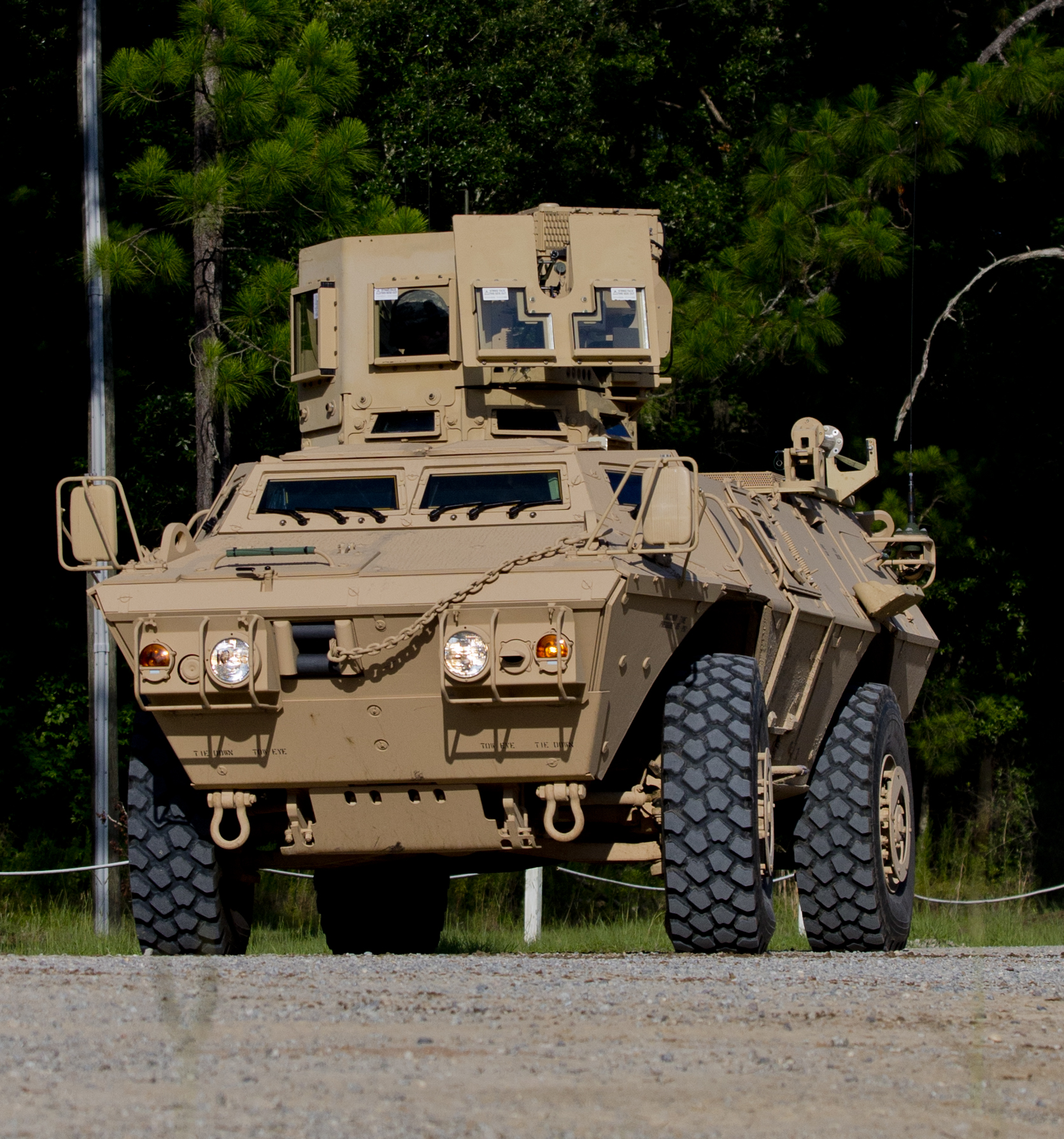
- Type: Internal security vehicle equipped for fire support coordination
- Place of origin: United States

Service history
- In service: 2007–present
- Wars: Global War on Terrorism; Iraq War; War in Afghanistan; Russo-Ukrainian War

Production history
- Designer: Leonardo DRS; Textron Marine & Land Systems
- Designed: Before 2007
- No. built: 465+

Specifications
- Mass: 14.75 t
- Crew: 3
- Armor: Rolled hard homogeneous steel
- Main armament: 1x M240B or 1x M2 Browning machine gun
- Engine: Cummins 6CTA8.3 turbocharged diesel 276 hp
- Transmission: Allison MD3560
- Suspension: 4x4
- Ground clearance: 0.45 m (1.5 ft)
- Operational range: ~440 mi
- Maximum speed: 63 mph

The M1200 Armored Knight is an armored vehicle used by forward observers in the U.S. military for precision targeting. Most Armored Knights were deployed during operations in Iraq and Afghanistan. The M1200 entered U.S. military service in 2007. Several M1200s entered service with the Armed Forces of Ukraine in 2025.

== Design ==
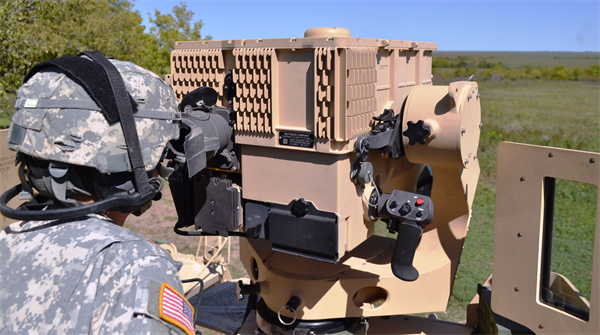
A fire support specialist looks through a laser range finder mounted atop an M1200 Knight armored vehicle

The Armored Knight is based on the M1117 ASV, fitted with the equipment needed to coordinate precision guided munitions and indirect artillery fire. According to the Strategy Page website;

The M1200 contains a laser designator, a laser range finder and GPS, plus radios and computers that take target position data and transmit it to distant artillery units, or bombers overhead, and get the firepower on the target within minutes. Previously, all this gear was mounted on an unarmored hummer.

The Armored Knight evolved from the desire to provide enhanced protection to the fire support teams who perform the targeting mission in high threat environments.

== Development ==
The Knight was developed in an effort to offer an armored vehicle capable of keeping up with COLTs (Combat Observation and Lasing Teams). The previous FiST-V (Fire Support Team-Vehicle) employed by the COLTs was the M707 Knight (a stripped-down variant of the HMMWV).

== Components ==
- FS3 Mounted Sensor
- Targeting Station Control Panel
- Mission Processor Unit
- Inertial Navigation Unit
- Global Positioning System Receiver
- Power Distribution Unit
- Stand Alone Computer Unit

== Operational history ==
The M1200 was first deployed in combat operations with the United States Army in 2008 during the U.S. occupation of Iraq. The M1200 was also deployed during U.S. operations in Afghanistan in 2010.

In early September 2025, photos emerged online of a newly delivered group of M1117 ASVs in Ukraine, and multiple M1200s were observed among them.

== Operators ==
- United States: 465 M1200 Armored Knight (OP) as of January 2025.
- Ukraine: Unknown number delivered in September 2025.

== See also ==
- List of U.S. military vehicles by model number
- Humvee
- M981 FISTV
- M1117 ASV
