= M970 =

US fuel truck

M970 5,000 Gallon Semitrailer Refueler
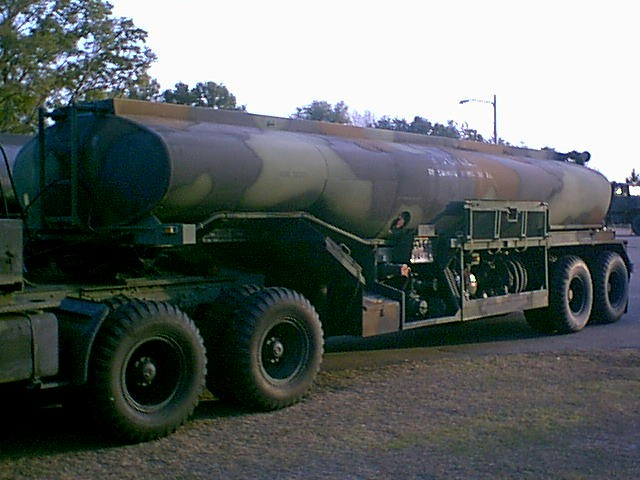

Overview
- Manufacturer: The Heil Company
- Production: 1980 or earlier
- Assembly: Athens, Tennessee

Body and chassis
- Class: Large Semi-trailer truck
- Body style: Tanker Semi-trailer truck
- Layout: Over and Underwing Refueling
- Related: M-967, M-969

Powertrain
- Engine: Lombardini 11 ld 626-3

Dimensions
- Length: 366 in (9.3 m)
- Width: 96 in (2.4 m)
- Height: 104.5 in (2.65 m)
- Curb weight: 15,200 lb (6,900 kg) empty, 49,150 lb (22,290 kg) loaded

Chronology
- Predecessor: M-131 Series
- Successor: None

The M970 Semi-Trailer Refueler is a 5,000-U.S.-gallon (19,000 L; 4,200 imp gal) fuel dispensing tanker designed for under/overwing refueling of aircraft. It is equipped with a filter/separator, recirculation system and two refueling systems, one for underwing and one for overwing servicing. The tanker is designed to be towed by a 5-ton, 6x6 truck tractor or similar vehicle equipped with a fifth wheel. The M970 can be loaded through the bottom or through the top fill openings. A ladder is provided at the front of the semitrailer for access to the top manhole, and a 4-cylinder diesel engine and pump assembly provides self load/unload capability. The body of the refueler is a 5,000-U.S.-gallon, single compartment, stainless steel tank. The chassis is of welded steel construction and is equipped with full floating tandem axles and a manually operated landing gear. There has been talk of retiring the M970, but a suitable off-road replacement has not been found. The Marine Corps also uses R-9 and R-10 tankers, but they are not capable of off road use. The M970 is a part of the "United States Marine Corps Maintenance Center - Albany, Georgia, USA - An Integrated Enterprise Scheduling Case Study" which is working to upgrade the Semitrailer for future use.

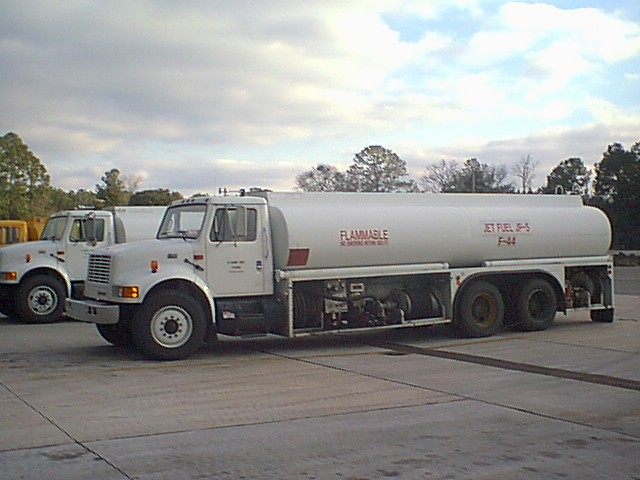
U.S. Marine Corps R-9, Non-Tactical Aircraft Refueler

The M967 and M969 versions are similar but are configured to carry vehicle fuels (gasoline, diesel). The M967A1, M969A1 and M970A1 versions relocate the top access ladder from the front of the tank to the rear.

== Utilization ==
The M970 can be used as a stand-alone fuel tanker, delivering fuel directly to aircraft on a flight line. The Semitrailer is also used in Forward Arming and Refueling Points (FARPs) delivering fuel to multiple nozzles for quick fueling operations at the front lines or beyond. This is generally used for helicopters, but can also be utilized with AV-8B Harrier II or with an Expeditionary Airfield (EAF). M970's were used to assist in loading the bladders for the Tactical Airfield Fuel Dispensing Systems (TAFDS) in the field as well.

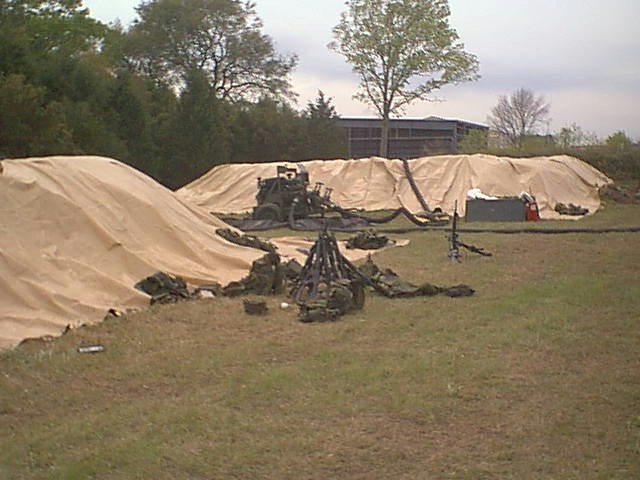
Part of the TAFDS, the fuel bladders.

The M969/M969A1 is a self loading and unloading tank semi-trailer designed to carry and dispense fuel to other vehicles at Forward Arming and Refueling Points. The M967/M967A1 is similar but it is designed to only carry bulk fuels between fuel terminals and depots and is not equipped to dispense fuel to other vehicles.

== Specifications ==
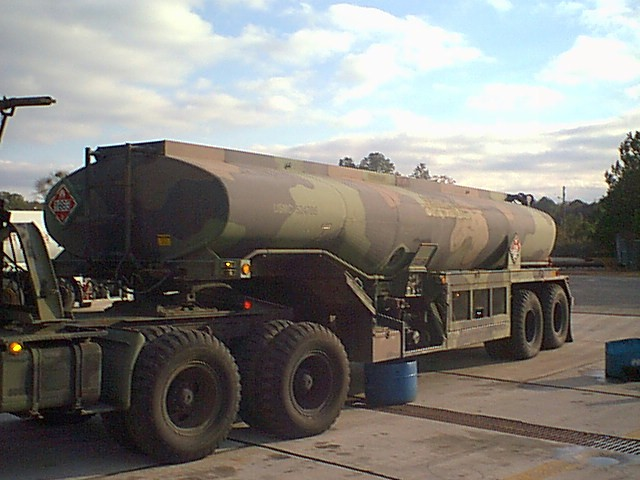
U.S. Marine Corps M970

All models of the M970/M970A1, M969/M969A1 and M967/M967A1 share a common basic chassis, motors, etc. The basic tank is a 5,000-US-gallon (19,000 L) baffled tank.

BASIC DIMENSIONS:

- Length : 366 in (9.3 m)
- Width : 96 in (2.4 m)
- Height : 104.5 in (2.65 m)
- Square : 244 sq ft (22.7 m^{2})
- Cube : 2,126 cu ft (60.2 m^{3})
- Weight: Empty - 15,200 lb (6,900 kg)
- Weight: Loaded - 49,150 lb (22,290 kg)
- Ground Clearance: M970 - 16 in (410 mm) / M970A1 - 19.5 in (500 mm)
- Kingpin Height: 56 in (1.4 m)

FUEL CAPACITY:

- 33,950 lb/5,000 U.S. gallons (19,000 L; 4,200 imp gal) highway
- 25,800 lb/3,800 U.S. gallons (14,000 L; 3,200 imp gal) cross country
- 20% maximum side slope wo/leakage: 5,000 U.S. gallons
- 10% maximum longitudinal slope wo/leakage:5,000 U.S. gallons

FUEL DATA FOR 4-CYLINDER ENGINE TYPE : Diesel

GALLONS PER HOUR: 1.5 U.S. gallons (5.7 L; 1.2 imp gal) Self Onload - 300gpm Offload - 600 pgm

FORDING CAPABILITY: Can ford hard, flat bottoms. Depth depends on prime mover and semitrailer payload (fuel is lighter than water and will float) Without a fording kit the tanker can enter 24 in (610 mm) of water safely.

ELECTRICAL SYSTEM: 24 volt, negative ground, powered by prime mover; pump motor, 12 volt, negative ground, 65 amperes

BRAKES: Air, powered by prime mover

EQUIPMENT OPTIONS: Kits: Vapor Recovery, Recirculation System, Two Refueling Systems - for Underwing and Overwing Servicing

=== Engine ===
The M970 and M970A1 models use a Cummins Onan four-cylinder inline diesel engine with air cooled compression ignition, producing 27.5 hp (20.5 kW). Though older models will be equipped with the Lombardini 11 ld 626-3. It has a fuel tank of 3.2 us gal.

=== Tires ===
The M970 uses 11:00 R20 tires with two tires per side per axle in the rear

== Models ==
The M970 series includes the following base models:

Model	Description
M970	5,000-U.S.-gallon fuel tanker
M970A1	Same as the M970, but has 3 inches (76 mm) more ground clearance

The M970 is towed by the following Prime Movers:

Model	Description
M-931	Tractor-trailer truck
M-932	Same as the M-931, but with a 15,000-pound (6,800 kg) winch on the front
M-818	Tractor-trailer truck
MTVR (MK31)	An MTVR tractor

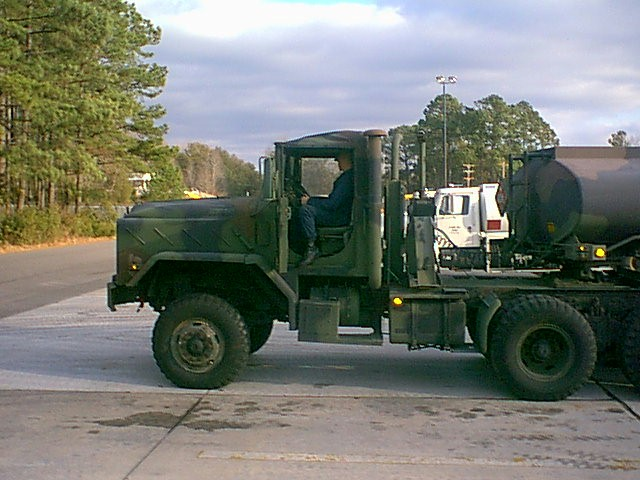
M-931 5-Ton Tractor

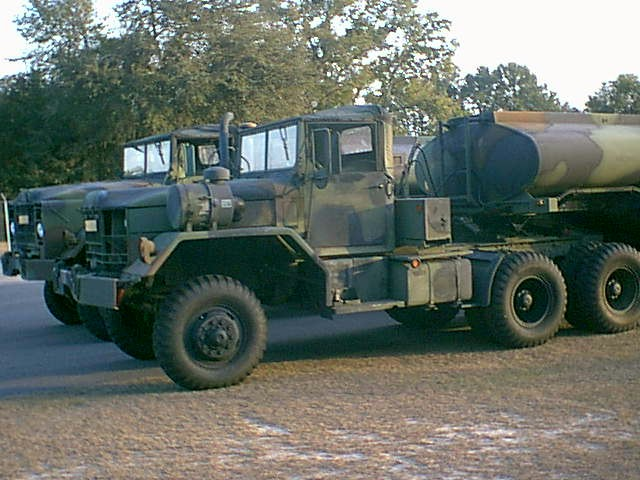
M-818 5-ton tractor

== Safety ==
Equipped with Filter Separator System which removes water and sediment from fuel; has emergency cut off valve for fuel dispensing; has shear pins and a spring valve in the underwing refuel hose should the hose separate from the hose reel while in use, preventing fuel from spilling into the deck; equipped with Purple-K fire extinguishers.

== See also ==
- Medium Tactical Vehicle Replacement (MTVR)
- Heavy Expanded Mobility Tactical Truck (HEMTT)
- Humvee
- Family of Medium Tactical Vehicles (FMTV)
