= XM800 armored reconnaissance scout vehicle =

Experimental reconnaissance vehicle developed by the US Army

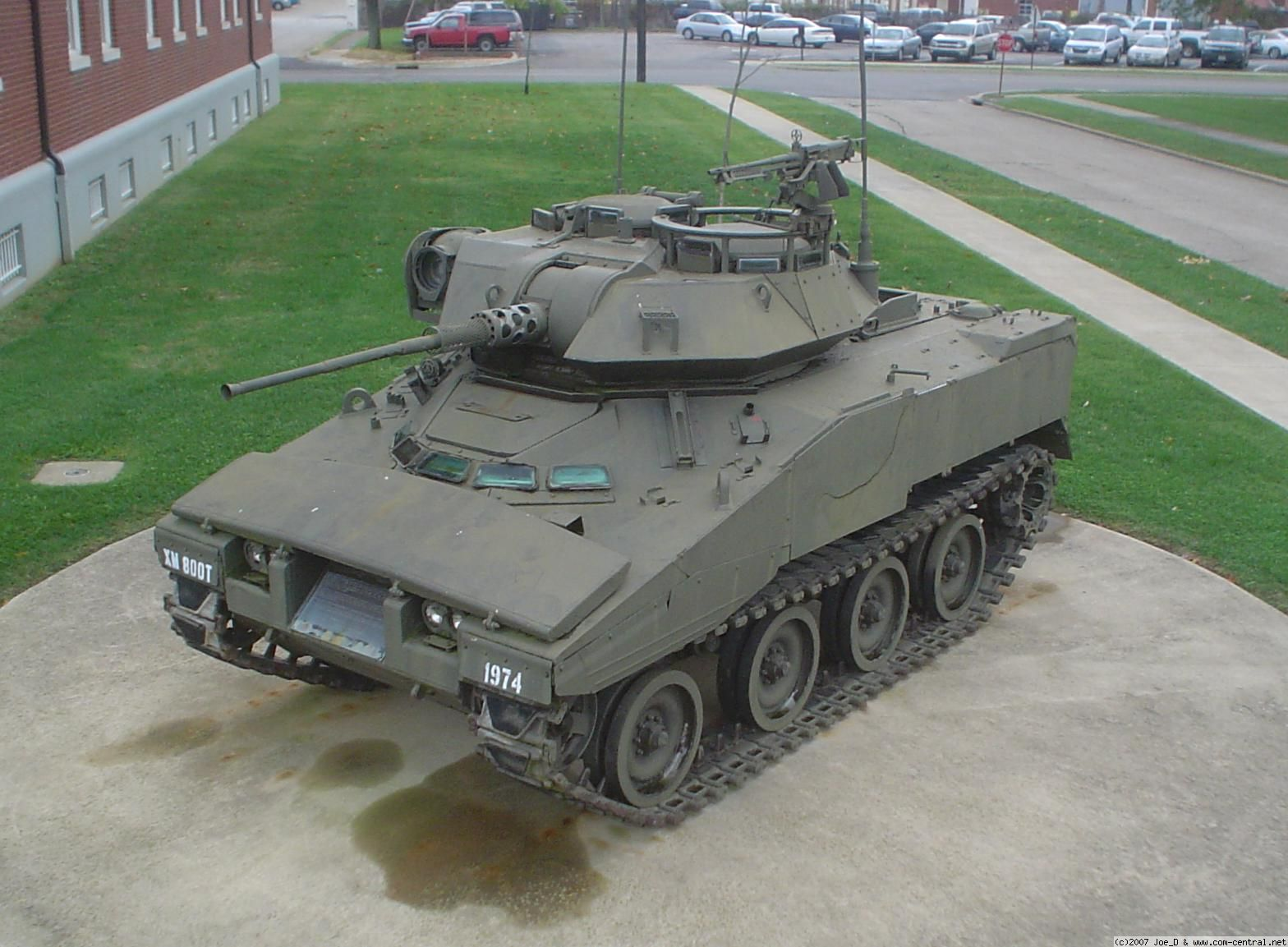
XM800T on display at Fort Knox

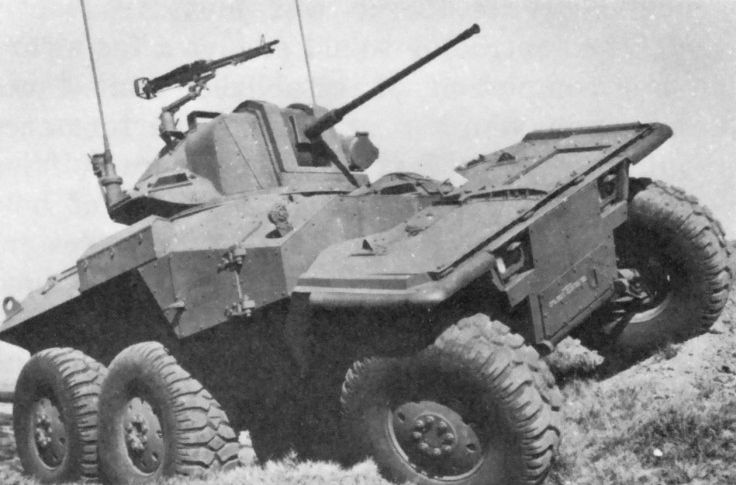
XM800W with the new turret design

The XM800 armored reconnaissance scout vehicle (ARSV) was an experimental scout vehicle developed by the US Army in the 1970s. It was part of a series of armored vehicles being designed by the Army to replace their existing armored personnel carriers, the M113 and M114, with vehicles with greatly improved fighting capabilities. While the MICV-65 program focused on troop carriers, a separate requirement for a scout vehicle led to the XM800. None of the vehicles from the MICV-65 project entered production, although they provided valuable experience that was used in the M2 Bradley.

In 1965, Australia, Canada, the United Kingdom and the U.S. began to collaborate on a common reconnaissance vehicle. The effort came to nothing as the UK developed the Combat Vehicle Reconnaissance (Tracked), and Canada acquired the Lynx. The U.S. Army issued a request for proposals for the armored reconnaissance scout vehicle as a replacement for the M114 in October 1971. Six companies responded: Chrysler, FMC Corporation and Teledyne Continental (with a variant of the Scorpion) submitted tracked designs while CONDEC, Ford and Lockheed Missiles and Space Company submitted wheeled designs.

Two different vehicle designs were selected for further evaluation in the XM800 program. Lockheed's XM800W unconventional articulated 6 × 6 wheeled armored car and FMC's XM800T tracked version. The contenders produced four prototypes each (three of which were delivered to the Army and one was retained by the company), test rigs and a hull for ballistics testing. Both models initially featured the same turret with the US-built version of the Hispano-Suiza HS.820 20 mm autocannon, the M139, as the primary weapon, as well as an M60-derived machine gun on a pintle mount. The M139 had been selected for all of the MICV projects. The XM800W was based on Lockheed's work with the 8 × 8 Lockheed XM808 Twister which was trialed in Vietnam. The XM800W was later equipped with a new turret design that kept the M139 cannon, but that had an upper cover that flipped forward to form a gun shield, or rearward to close up.

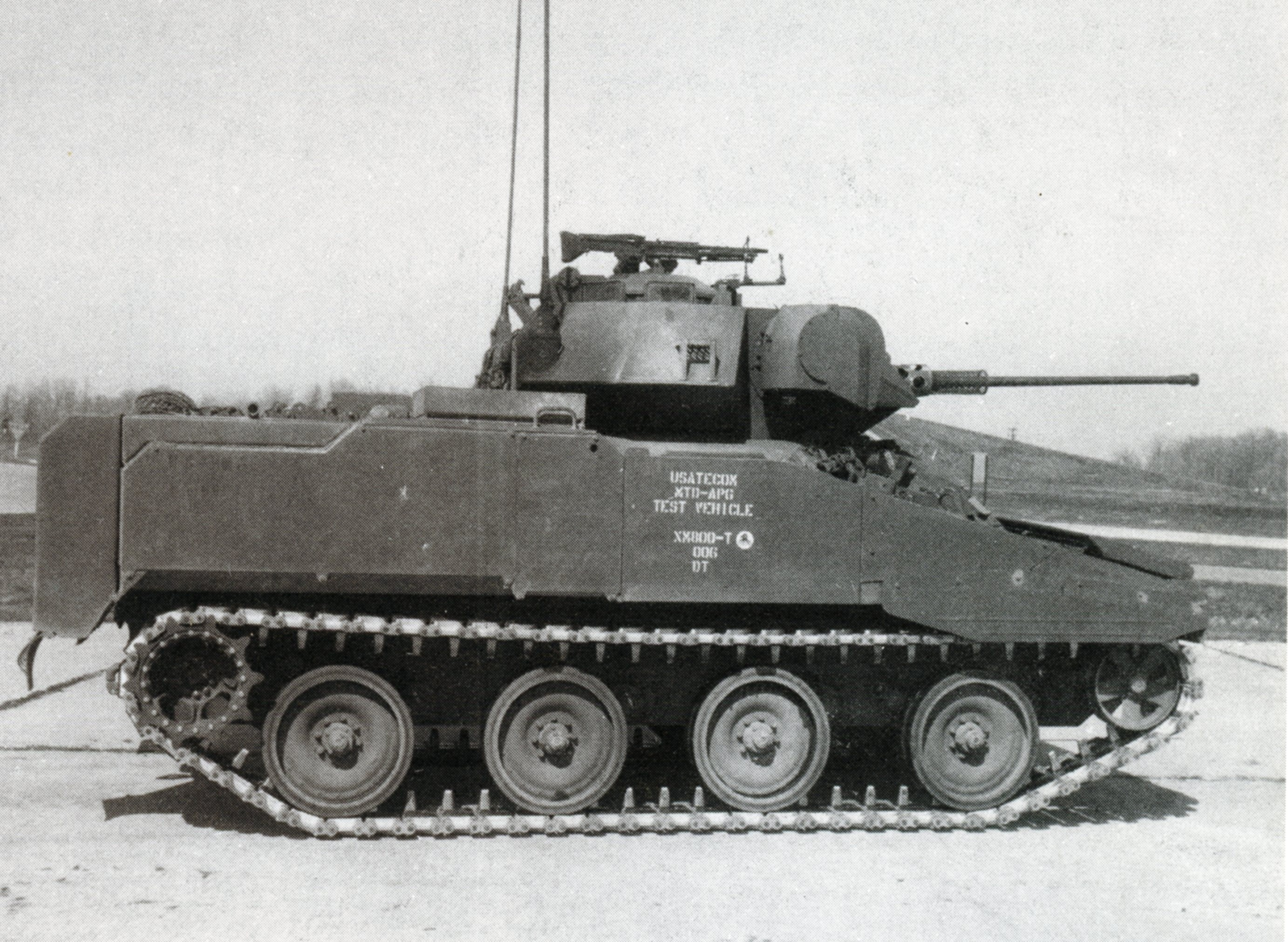
XM800T

During the June to August 1974 force development test and evaluation, the XM800T and XM800W were evaluated with and without their turrets. They were compared with vehicles including the M113A1 armored personnel carrier (utilized as a baseline), M113A1 AIFV, Canadian Lynx, PI M113A1 1/2 featuring a turbocharged engine and tube-over-bar suspension, British Scimitar reconnaissance vehicle, modified M551 Sheridan, XR-311 dune buggy, and V-150 armored car.

The test report determined that the XM800T displayed superior overall performance as an ARSV compared to both the M113A1 and the XM800W. Conversely, the XM800W exhibited commendable performance on roads with its quiet operation and high speed. Nevertheless, its limited cross-country mobility, along with issues of lateral instability and directional control, made it inferior overall compared to the M113A1.

As of 1976, the program was reported to be in trouble. Jane's Christopher F Foss reported that while FMC's vehicle appeared to be superior, neither vehicle had the required surveillance equipment, anti-aircraft armament, and could not operate for a continuous 24-hour period. As of early 1974, $39.5 million had been spent on the program.

== Surviving examples ==
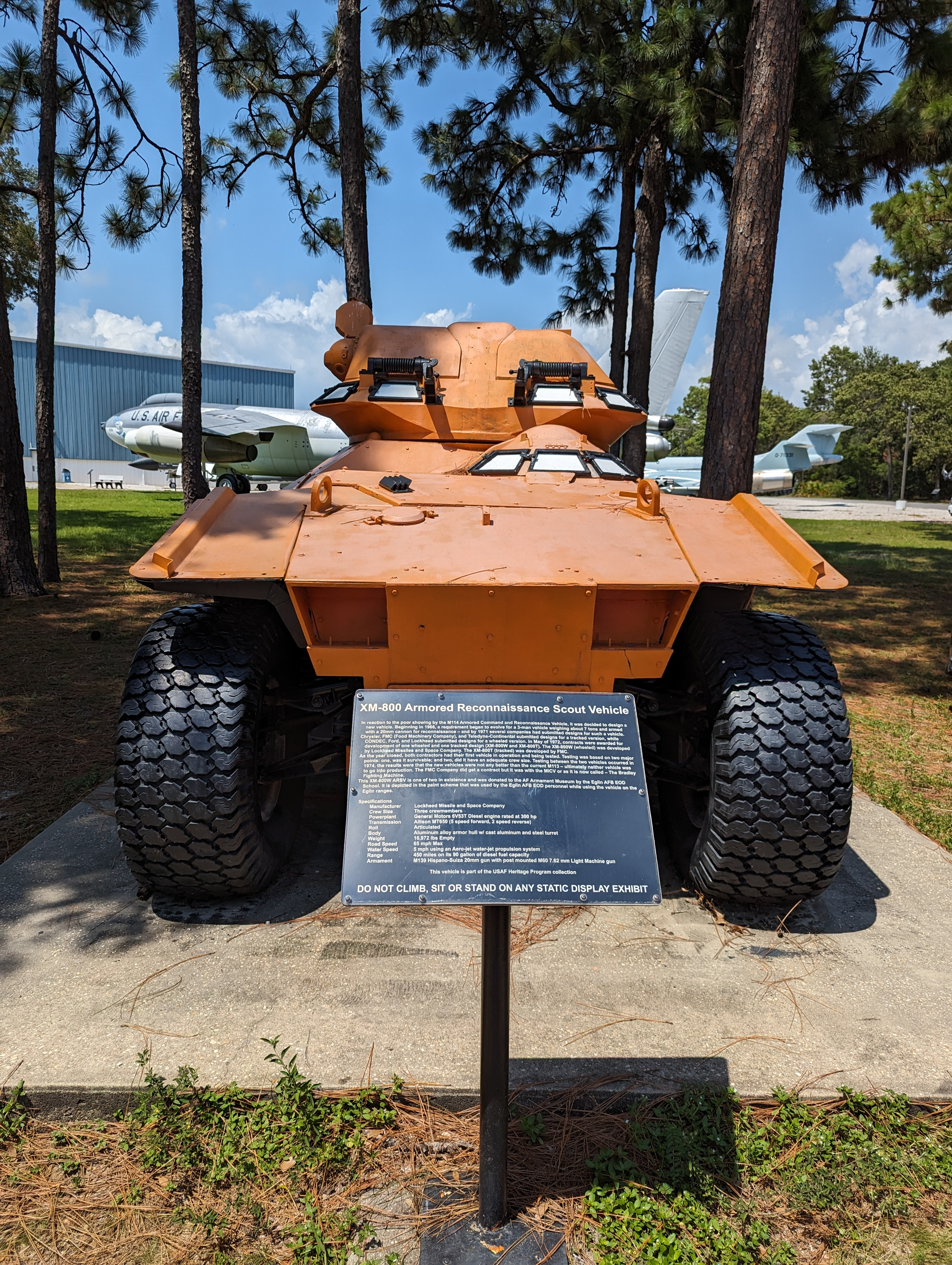
XM800W on display at the Air Force Armament Museum

=== XM800W ===
- Air Force Armament Museum, Eglin Air Force Base, Florida on static display. The vehicle is in its EOD configuration that was used at the Eglin EOD school, today the Naval School Explosive Ordnance Disposal (NAVSCOLEOD) school.

=== XM800T ===
- General George Patton Museum of Leadership, Fort Knox, Kentucky on static display.
- U.S. Army Armor and Cavalry Collection, Fort Benning, Georgia on static display.
- Eagle Field Foundation, Firebaugh, California. The vehicle is in operating condition. Currently on display at Moffett Field Museum, Mountain View, California.
- Military Museum of Southern New England, Danbury, Connecticut, now closed with vehicle whereabouts unknown. The vehicle was displayed with twin BGM-71 TOW launchers.
