= T7 armored car =

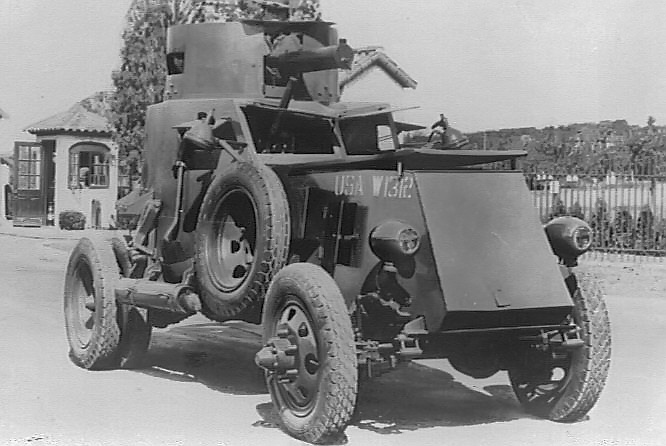
- A historical picture of the T7 armored car
- Type: Prototype armored car
- Place of origin: United States

Production history
- No. built: 6

Specifications
- Crew: 4
- Main armament: .50 MG
- Secondary armament: 2 x .30 MG
- Engine: Franklin. air-cooled, 6-cylinder, gasoline
- Suspension: 4x4 wheel

The T7 armored car was a prototype small armored car produced by Holabird Quartermaster Depot for the US Army in 1930. All six vehicles that were completed, USA W1310, USA W1311, USA W1312, USA W1313, USA W1314 and USA W1315, were 4x4 wheeled vehicles, powered by Franklin's air-cooled, 6-cylinder, gasoline engine, with a crew of four and armed with one .50 calibre machine gun supported by two .30 calibre lighter machine guns.

== Design ==
The T7 armored car was a 4x4 wheeled armored car. It was powered by a Franklin 6-cylinder, air-cooled, gasoline engine. It was equipped with one 0.5 in (13 mm) M2 Browning machine gun and two 0.3 in (7.6 mm) M1919 machine guns and was operated by a crew of 4.

== Production ==
The T7 was produced by the Holabird Quartermaster Depot. Only six vehicles were completed, which were labeled USA W1310, USA W1311, USA W1312, USA W1313, USA W1314 and USA W1315 respectively. One of the chassis produced was converted to a T6 Armored Car.
