= M9 armored combat earthmover =

M9 ACE (armored combat earthmover)
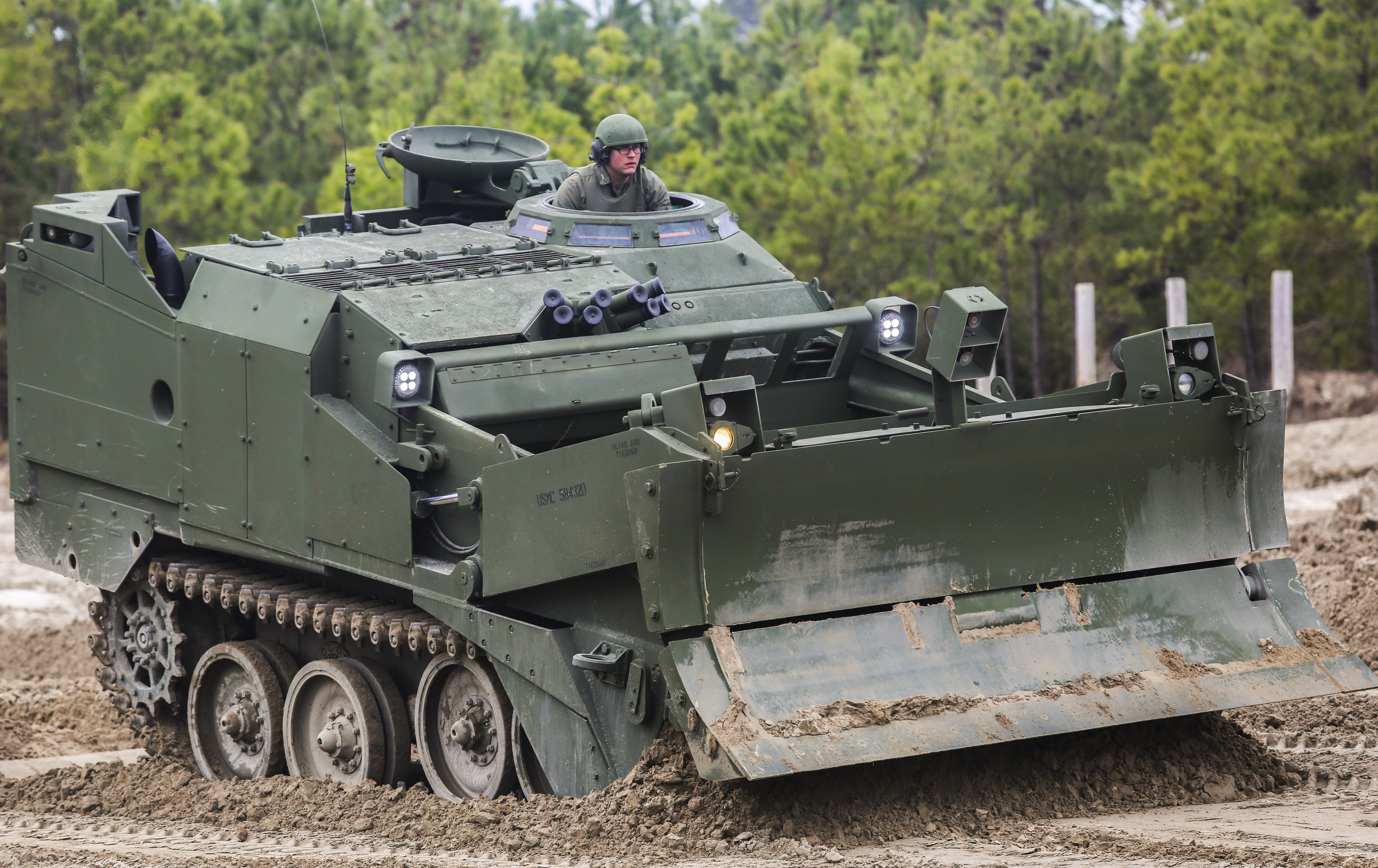
- An upgraded M9 ACE during a bulldozing operation
- Type: Combat engineering vehicle
- Place of origin: United States

Service history
- In service: 1986-present

Specifications
- Mass: 34,800 pounds (15,800 kg) (combat loaded)
- Length: 6.15 m
- Width: 2.79 m (without blade extensions)
- Height: 2.7 m
- Crew: 1
- Armor: Aluminum, Kevlar, and Steel, resistant to shell splinters and small arms fire, NBC protection
- Engine: Cummins V903C, 8 cylinder, diesel 295 hp (220 kW)
- Suspension: Hydropneumatic
- Operational range: 322 km or 200 miles
- Maximum speed: 30 miles per hour (48 km/h)

The M9 armored combat earthmover (ACE) is a highly mobile armored tracked vehicle that provides combat engineer support to frontline forces. Fielded by the United States Marine Corps, and the United States Army, its tasks include eliminating enemy obstacles, maintenance and repair of roads and supply routes, and construction of fighting positions.

== History ==
The M9 grew out of the universal engineer tractor (UET), a follow-up to 1958's all-purpose ballastable crawler (ABC), also a tractor. By making a small tractor or scraper, it was possible to create a lightweight vehicle that could use local material as ballast. The weight was kept low enough to allow transportation in smaller cargo aircraft, to be air-droppable, and to allow the vehicle to float and swim. Initial development was between the engineer laboratory at Fort Belvoir with International Harvester and Caterpillar. Successful in testing and exciting a good deal of interest for civilian spin-off, the concept languished after a demonstration where key decision-makers saw the vehicle sink in front of them while demonstrating its swimming ability.

The UET was originally seen as a squad vehicle with provision for troop seats in the bowl. It was also tested as a cargo vehicle and even as a mobile mortar carrier.

The M9 is a highly mobile, armored, amphibious tractor, dozer, and scraper. It was finally fielded in 1986 and is capable of supporting forces in both offensive and defensive operations. It performs critical combat engineer tasks such as digging hull defilade fighting positions for guns, tanks, and other battlefield systems to increase their survivability. The ACE breaches berms, prepares anti-tank ditches, prepares combat roads, removes roadblocks, and prepares access routes at water obstacles.

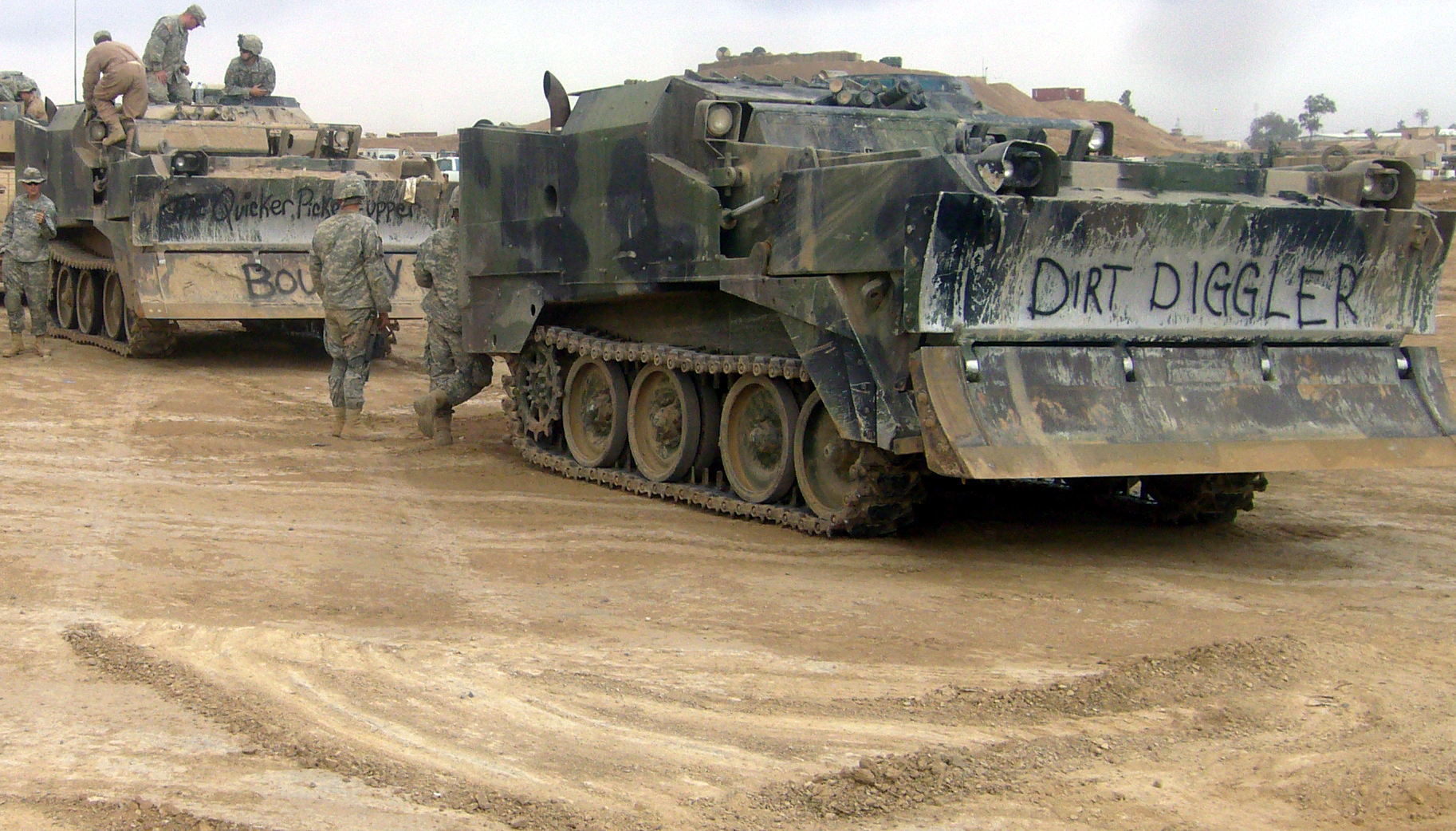
Two M9 ACEs staged ready to go out on a mission in Iraq

The engine, drive train, and driver's compartment are biased toward the rear of the vehicle, while the front comprises an 8.7 cubic yard (6.7 m^{3}) bowl, apron, and dozer blade with a composite aluminum ejector which can unload ballast and or cargo quickly in combat or hostile conditions. Armor consists of welded aluminum with selected steel and aramid-laminated plates. An armored cupola containing eight vision blocks covers the driver's compartment. The vehicle hull is welded and bolted aluminum with a two-speed winch capable of a 25,000 pound (110 kN) line pull. Towing pintle and airbrake connections are provided. It is equipped with a suspension system which allows the front of the vehicle to be raised, lowered, or tilted to permit dozing, excavating, rough grading, and ditching functions. The M9 is armored against small arms and artillery fragmentation, has smoke screening capability, and has chemical-biological protection for the operator. Its roadspeed is 30 mph (48 km/h). It is transportable in C-130, C-141, and C-5 aircraft and can swim at 3 mph (4.8 km/h) under ideal conditions. Since the removal of swim missions as a task for the M9, the swim-related components are not required to be maintained.

By raising the dozer blade and using its scraper blade, the ACE can fill itself with ballast to improve dozing efficiency. It can also be ejected quickly, thus eliminating the need for a bucket loader and dump truck. Another key feature of the M9 is its hydropneumatic suspension system. The principal components are eight high-pressure hydraulic rotary actuators (four on each side) which connect to the roadwheel stations. During high-speed travel, this system ensures a smooth ride through the use of shock-absorbing accumulators. In earthmoving operations, the operator rotates the actuators, thus lowering the apron and blade for digging.

A typical US Army combat engineer battalion contains 22 ACEs - seven per company - plus an operational readiness float. The active Army has a total of 447 M9 ACEs.

== Employment ==
The M9 performs mobility, countermobility, sustainability, and survivability tasks in combination with light or heavy combined arms forces. Tasks include the preparation or reduction of obstacles, waste management, and route clearance. It also serves a limited role in offensive breaches by carrying mine-clearing line charges.

In Operation Desert Storm, the ACE proved to be a successful combination of armored vehicle and combat earthmover that was capable of keeping pace with the maneuver units. This was possible because of the ACE's ability to fold its blade in half upwards, allowing for unloaded travel. This is also associated with a decreased combat efficiency due to the manual locking pins, which were usually unnecessary unless traveling at high speeds, as this could sever the blade hinges when not carefully monitored. While some operators are more efficient with the D7 dozer in earthmoving, some can outpace heavy, slow, traditional dozers by scraping in clutch brake two or three which overcomes lack of cutting ability due to lack of mass with speed. This ability to move with maneuver forces over several hundred kilometers of desert allowed it to successfully perform a wide variety of missions such as construction of combat roads and trails, survivability positions, and berms. It can move as fast as an M1 or M2 over rough terrain, but on improved roads and hardball it is limited to a maximum of 35 mph with some governors limited to around 27 mph. The vehicle operator can adjust to prevent this.

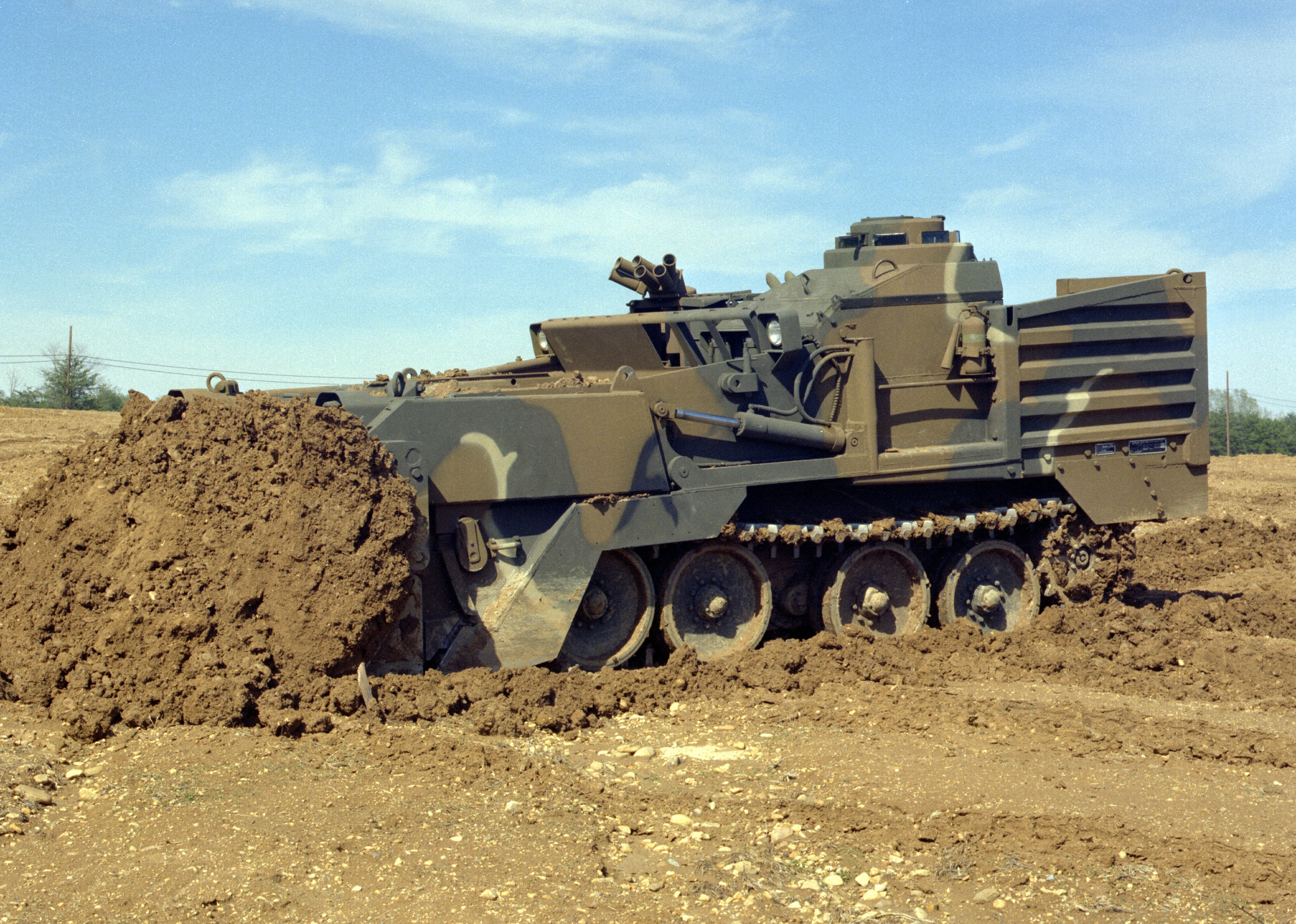
M9 ACE moving earth during an exercise

The training of ACE operators appeared in some units to be inadequate, constrained by a lack of technical mechanical expertise and maintenance of hydraulic accumulators systems. Most operators were unfamiliar with the techniques associated with dozing, scraping, cut and fill ops, and grading. The ACE experienced some troubles in reducing the berms associated with Iraqi tank ditches (berm on enemy side). Due to the location of the driver in relation to the vehicle blade, the soldiers had difficulty seeing the bottom of blade, while buttoned up through the periscope, but could determine when they are about to tip over with the assistance of the horizon and the top of the blade creating an intersecting angle or with a manual level indicating the degree of slopes that are within acceptable operational capabilities. The ACE operator can use a front-mounted telescope or a side-mounted periscope or video monitors to overcome this deficiency, also as load is increased the sound frequency of the engine changes indicating load to the experienced night operators, without the use of electronic or manual gauges. The ACE led the way in breaching the border berm between Saudi Arabia and Iraq, and in reducing trench-lines during the assault breach. The ACE performed beyond its expected capability. Later studies discovered its grim success against the unequipped Iraqi forces, with ACEs of the First Infantry Division burying hundreds or thousands of Iraqi soldiers alive in their trenches.

Problems were encountered with the ACE's trainers and maintenance shortcomings. One commander referred to the ACE operator as "Alone, unarmed, and unafraid". This highlights the ACE's major shortcomings as a piece of mobility equipment used during direct fire engagements. ACE operators, usually 19-year-old PFCs, led the 7th Corps breach into hostile country. However, they met with very light resistance. The ACE is a single operator vehicle,

== Basis of issue- US Army ==
- Six per engineer company in a heavy division
- Six per armored cavalry regiment
- Six per engineer company, heavy separate brigade
- Six per engineer combat company (mech) corps
- Six per HHC, engineer battalion, light infantry division
- Four per engineer company, separate infantry brigade (ribbon)
- Two per engineer company (assault float bridge)(ribbon) at corps
- One per engineer company (medium girder bridge)
- One per bridge company (ribbon)

== Operators ==
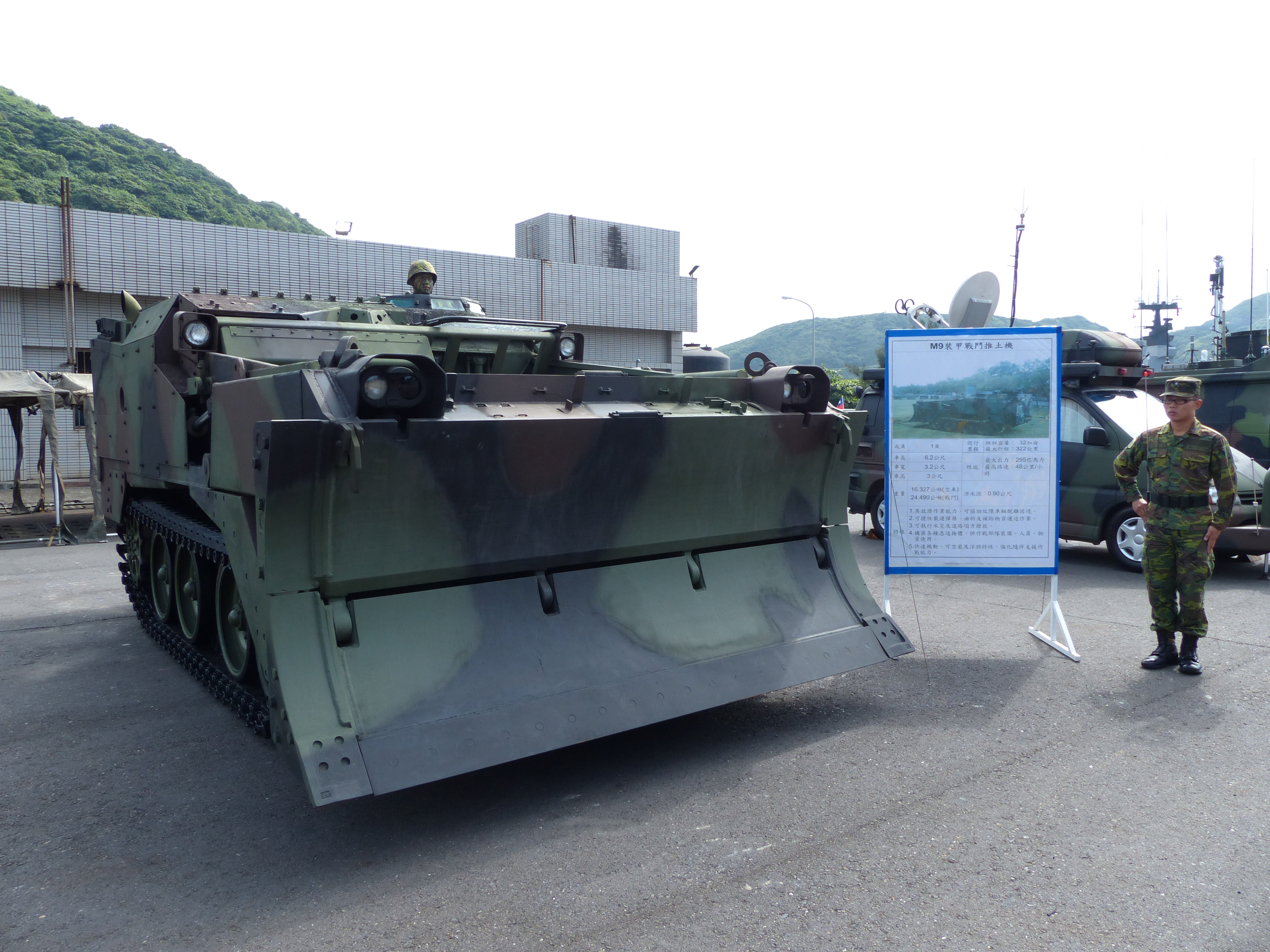
ROCA M9 ACE Display at No.11 Pier of Zhongzheng Naval Base

- South Korea: Republic of Korea Army, 207 KM9 ACE made under licence in South Korea by Samsung Techwin.
- United States: United States Army, 250 M9 ACE as of January 2025.
- Republic of China: Republic of China Army, 19 M9 ACE as of 2023.
