= R-11 Refueler =

US Air Force fuel truck

R-11 Refueling Vehicle
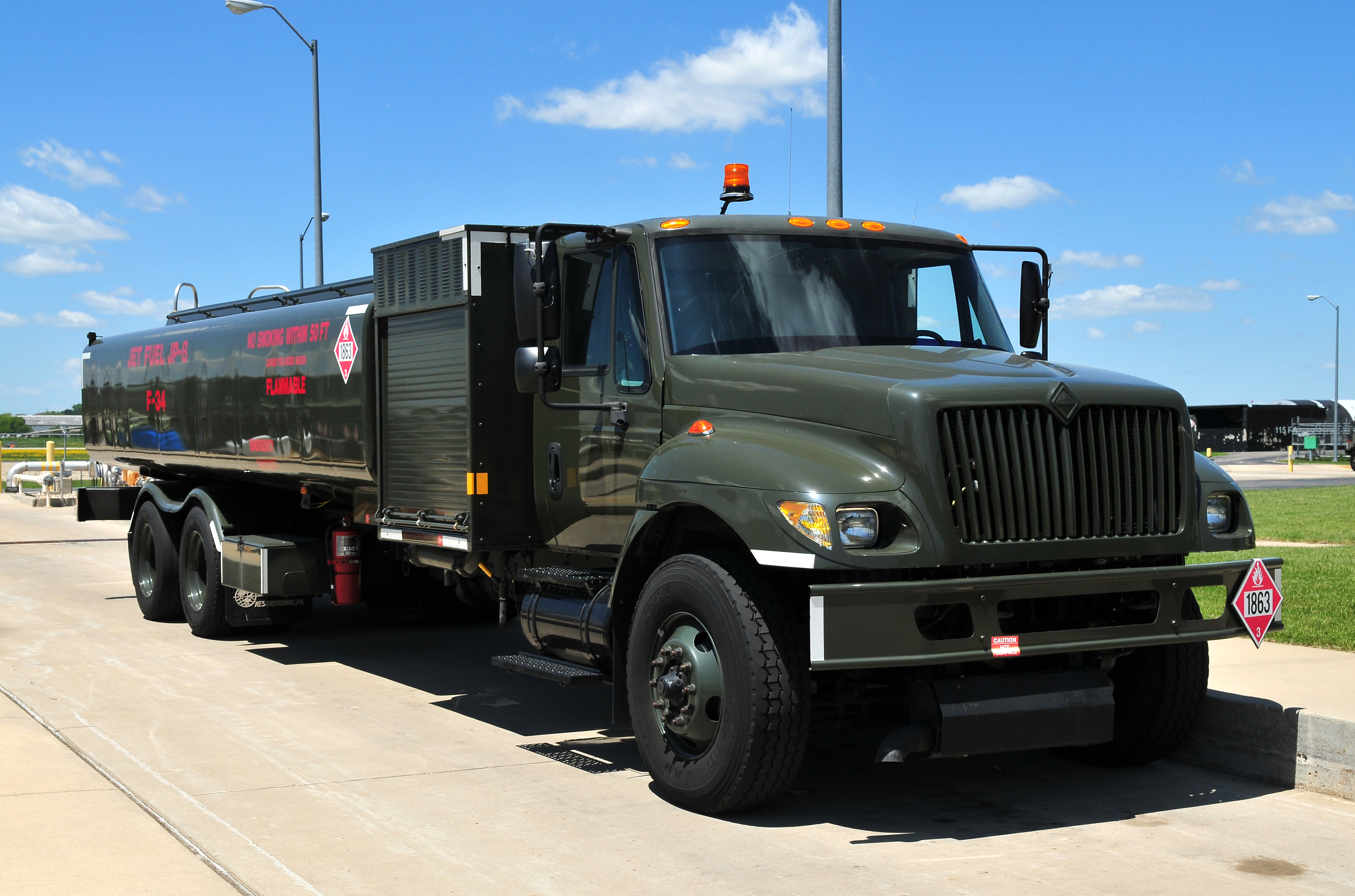
- International R-11

Overview
- Manufacturer: 1st generation: Oshkosh Corporation; 2nd generation: Kovatch Corporation; 3rd generation: Kovatch Corporation; 4th generation: ATAP, Inc.
- Production: 1989-Present

Body and chassis
- Body style: 2-door cab
- Layout: 2 door cab, pumping compartment, 6,000 gal. storage tank

Powertrain
- Engine: 6 cylinder, turbocharged, after cooled (Oshkosh). 6 cylinder, turbocharged, liquid cooled (Kovatch).

Dimensions
- Curb weight: 40,000 lbs (Empty)70,000 (Full)

Chronology
- Predecessor: R-9
- Successor: None

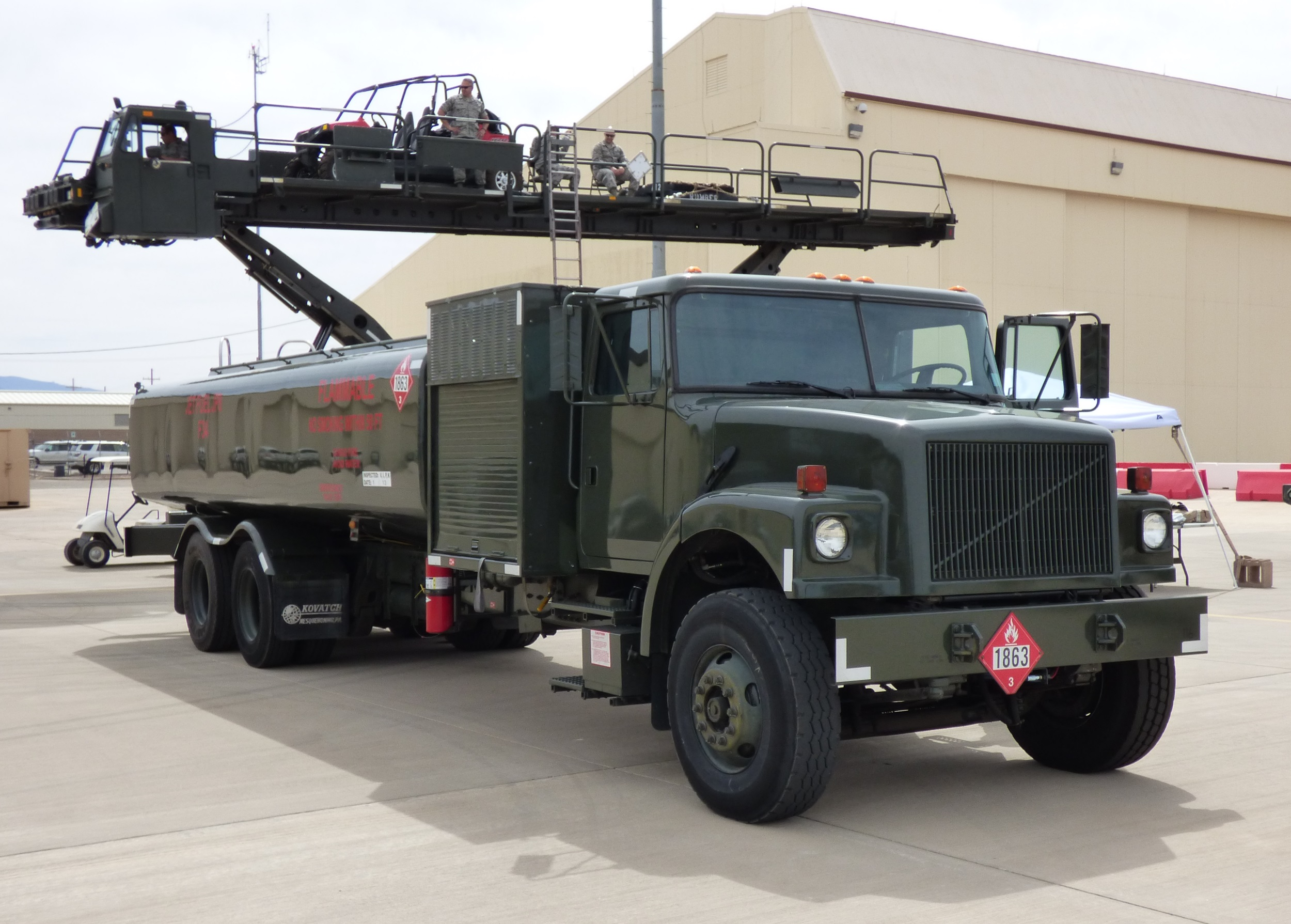
Volvo R-11

The R-11 Refueler replaced the R-9 Refueler as the primary mobile refueling vehicle for The United States Air Force. There are currently three models of the R-11. The first generation was delivered in 1989 to the Air Force by the Oshkosh Truck Corporation and is commonly referred to as the Oshkosh R-11. The Air Force purchased 1,250 Oshkosh R-11s between 1987 and 1991. Deliveries of the second generation R-11 began in 1994. The contract for the second generation model was awarded to the Kovatch Corporation, and the pumping and dispensing systems are mounted on a Volvo chassis. These models are commonly referred to as the Volvo R-11. Deliveries of the third generation R-11 began in 2004. The contract for this model was also awarded to the Kovatch Corporation, and the pumping and dispensing systems are mounted on an International chassis. This model is commonly referred to as the International R-11. There is a new specification that has been manufactured by ATAP, Inc.

R-11 fuel tanks hold a maximum capacity of 6,000 US gallons (23,000 L) and are able to issue fuel at a rate of 600 US gallons (2,300 L) per minute.

== See also ==
- List of military vehicles
