= Vehicle registration plates of the United States Army in Germany =

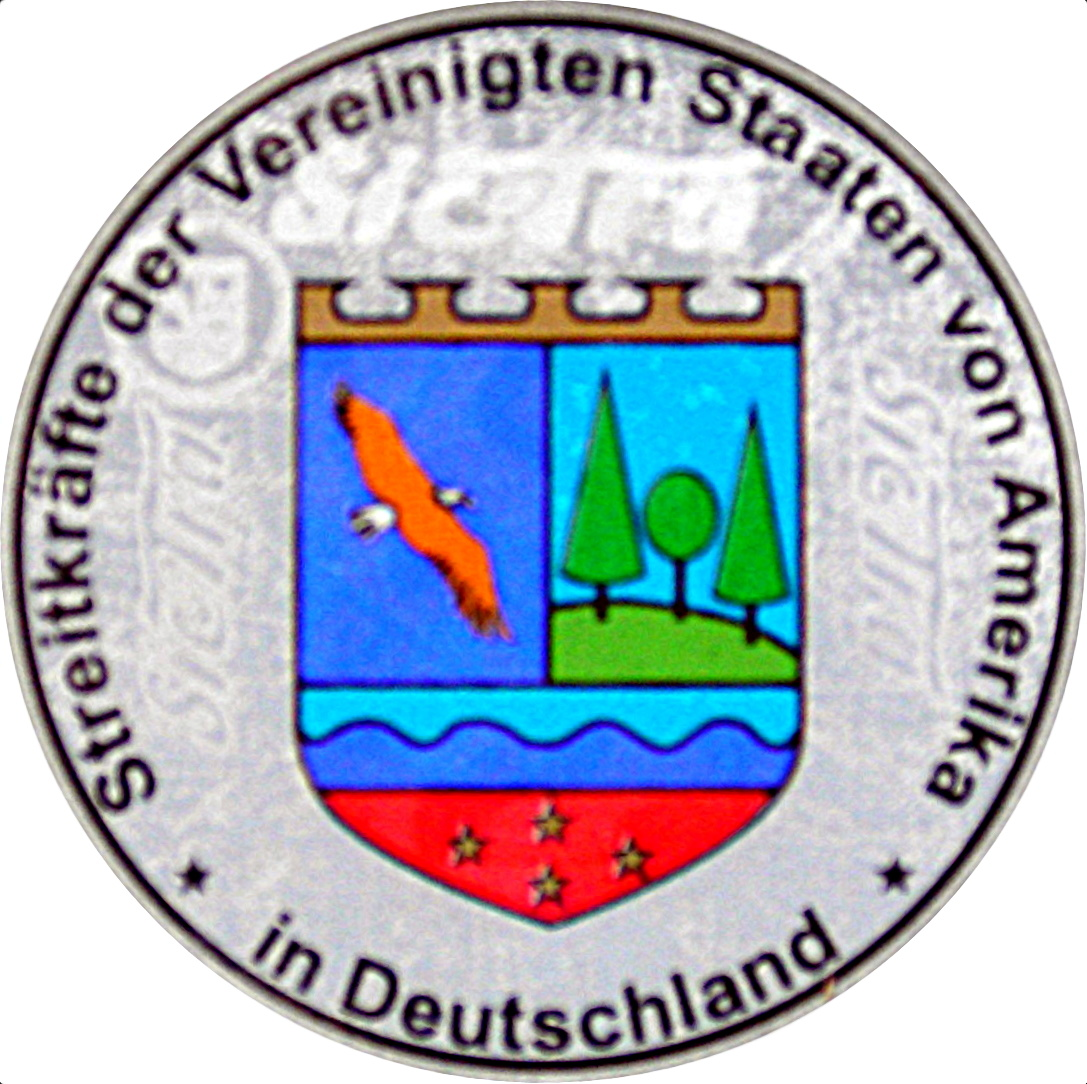
Seal of a Vehicle registration plate of the United States Armed Forces in Germany.

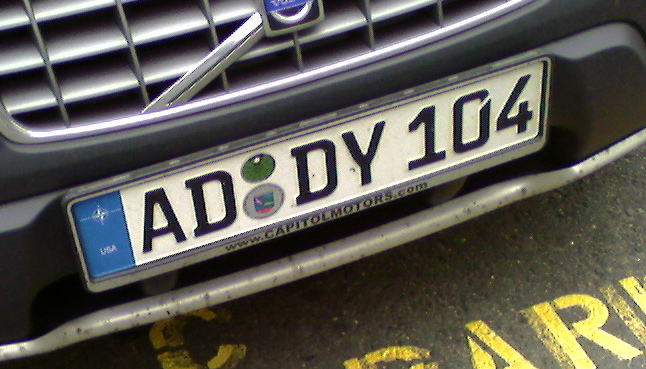
Example (German standard size)

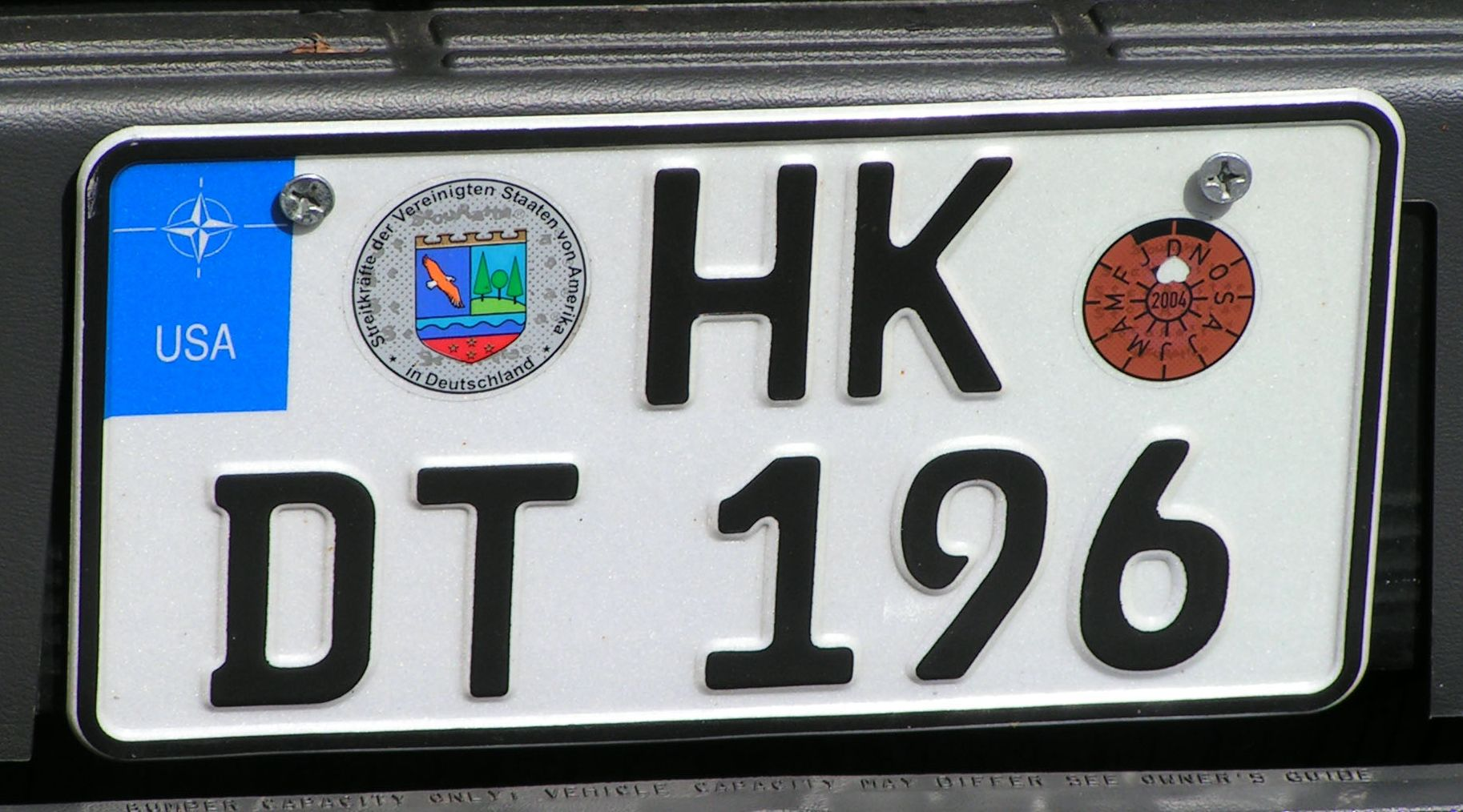
Example (smaller size)

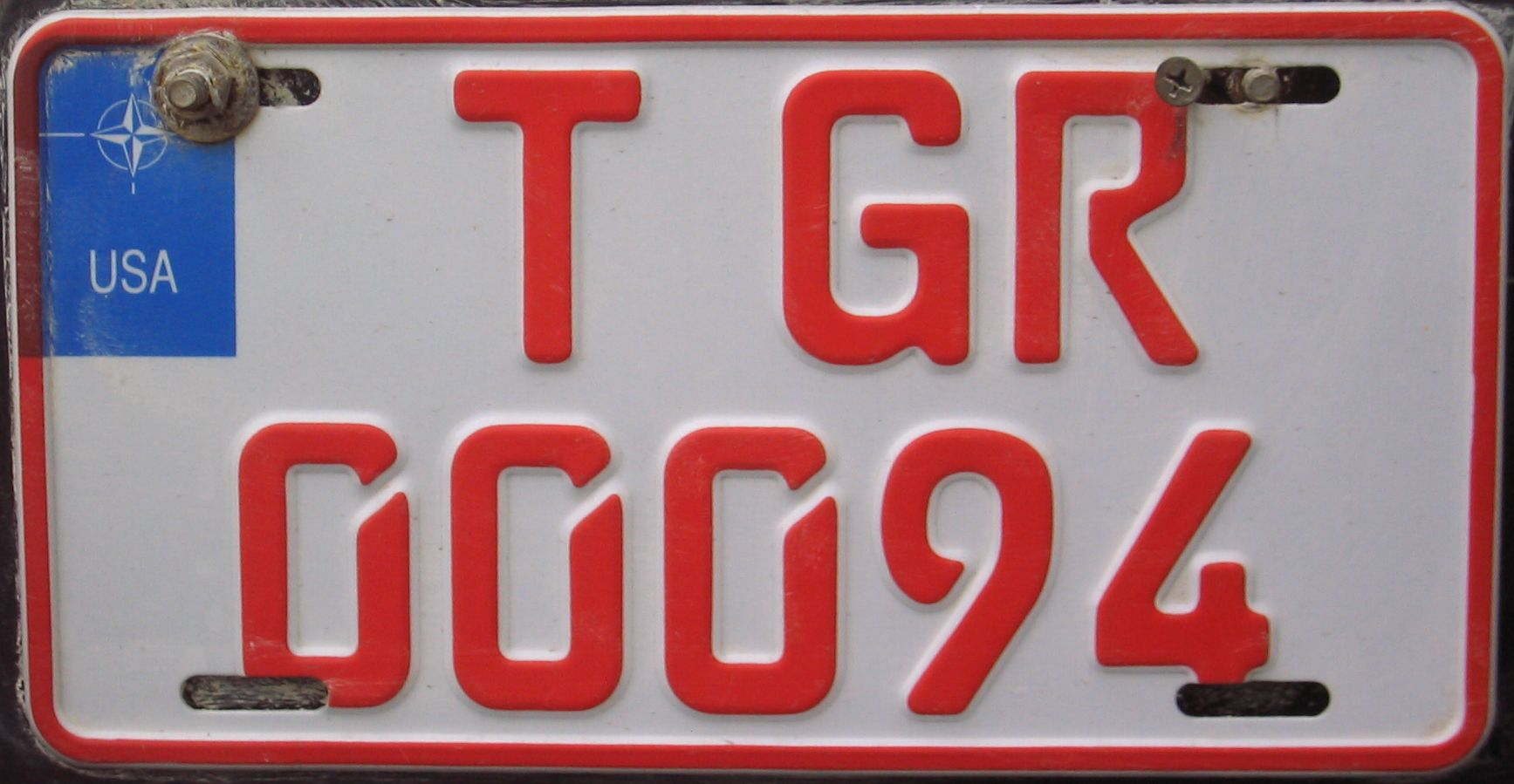
Red transfer plate, Headquarters Grafenwöhr

American-market vehicle with smaller plate (smaller size)

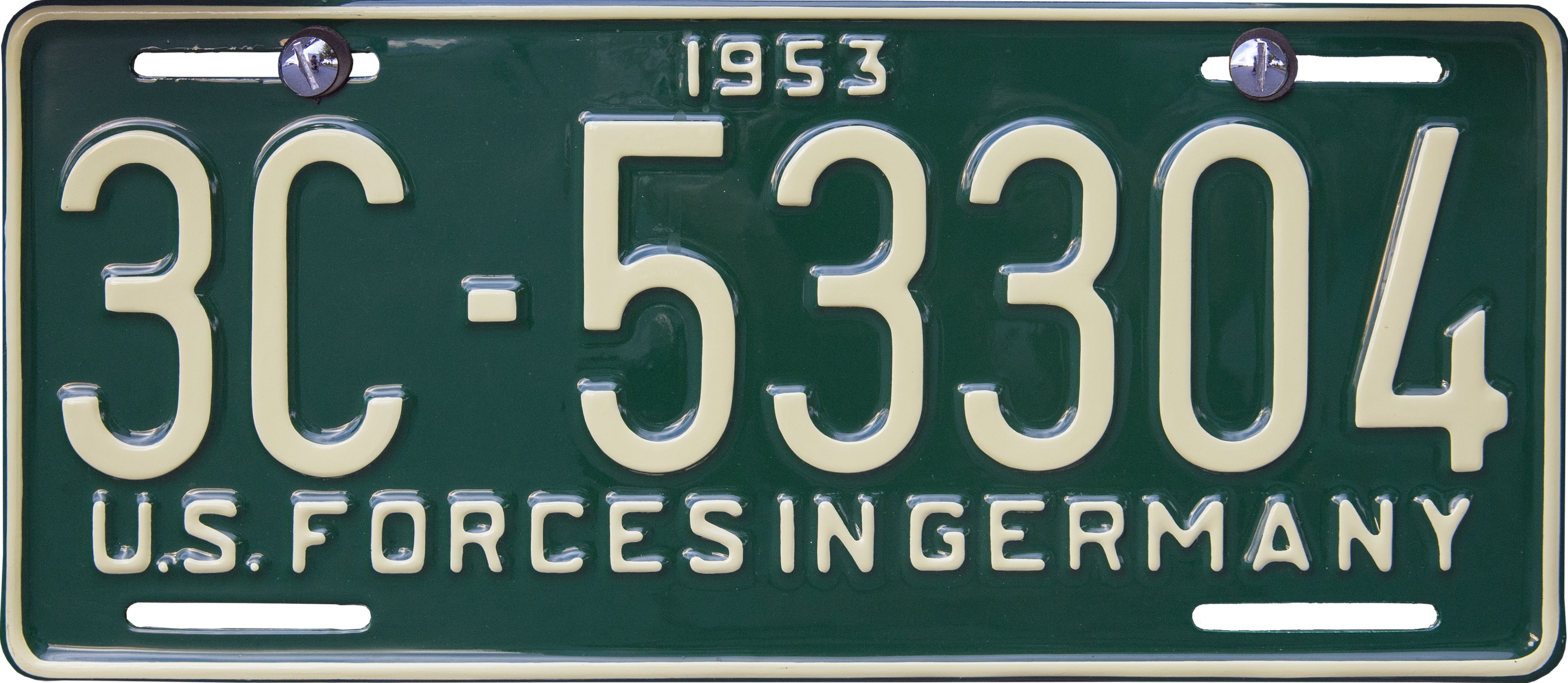
occupation 1947-style license plate

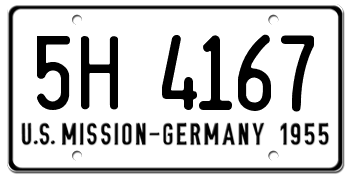
occupation 1955 license plate

From 2000 to 2006, private vehicles belonging to American Service personnel and dependent family members based in Germany carried a distinct series of German-style number plates.

== Features ==
Their plates carried the NATO insignia on a blue background instead of the EU stars, the USA country code, and registration numbers starting with AD, AF or HK, while numbers starting in IF on similar plates were used for official NATO vehicles of all non-German nationalities.

The plates' upper sticker showed the expiry date of the plate, rather than technical fitness as the German one does. Furthermore, unlike the German one this sticker is punched to indicate clearly the date. The lower sticker showed the text: "Streitkräfte der Vereinigten Staaten von Amerika in Deutschland" (Armed Forces of the US in Germany). US-market vehicles without proper mounting brackets for European-standard plates received plates made to a small size which is in Germany normally dedicated for light motorcycles or agricultural vehicles.

== Changes ==
When the US forces began using this system, they chose the first two-letter codes not yet used in the German registration system, namely AD (standard size) and AF (small size). After some time they realized that AF could be easily interpreted as Armed Forces or Air Force, defeating the purpose of using German-style plates. So they discontinued issuing plates with "AF" and began using "HK" (which is now used by the German district Heidekreis) instead. For official vehicles the code "IF" is used with standard-size plates. By law the vehicles must carry the "USA" sticker since they are registered by a non-European Union country. But in this special matter this law is not enforced in Germany with US Army vehicles. When traveling outside Germany, US military laws required that USA sticker be displayed on the rear of the car. Since the change to local German plates (see below) this rule is no longer valid.

== New system ==
In 2005, the US Forces in Germany decided that service members' private vehicles should carry normal German plates for security reasons. Re-registering with German plates began in December 2005. Each vehicle now displays the prefix for the area where the owner registered the vehicle (i.e. Frankfurt, Bamberg, Heidelberg, Kaiserslautern or Würzburg area), just like a regular German vehicle; the only difference is that they will be exempt from German tax and safety inspections (TÜV), but since the change the vehicles have to comply with EU sound regulations, are not allowed to have their front windows tinted and have to comply with all EU safety regulations. The US vehicles do not have to comply with EU lighting and emission regulations since the US standards are different.

At the end of 2008 the US Forces started to introduce a new plate for temporary registration of vehicles (transfer plates). The small-size version with the blue strip "USA" and NATO insignia is in use. The red letters are in FE-style and the code follows the format "T xx yyyyy". The "T" happens to be short for either "temporary" or "transfer", but was primarily chosen because it is not used by any German registration district, therefore avoiding overlaps with actual German plates. The "xx" is the code for the local headquarters and "yyyyy" a 5-digit serial number filled with zeros if necessary. This kind of plate carries no stickers.

code	local headquarters
T A	Augsburg
T BA	Bamberg
T BH	Baumholder
T BR	Bruchsal
T GK	Geilenkirchen
T GR	Grafenwöhr
T H	Heidelberg
T HS	Hohenfels
T I	Illesheim
T K	Kaiserslautern
T M	Sembach
T MA	Mannheim
T S	Stuttgart
T SP	Spangdahlem
T SW	Schweinfurt
T W	Wiesbaden
