= M981 FISTV =

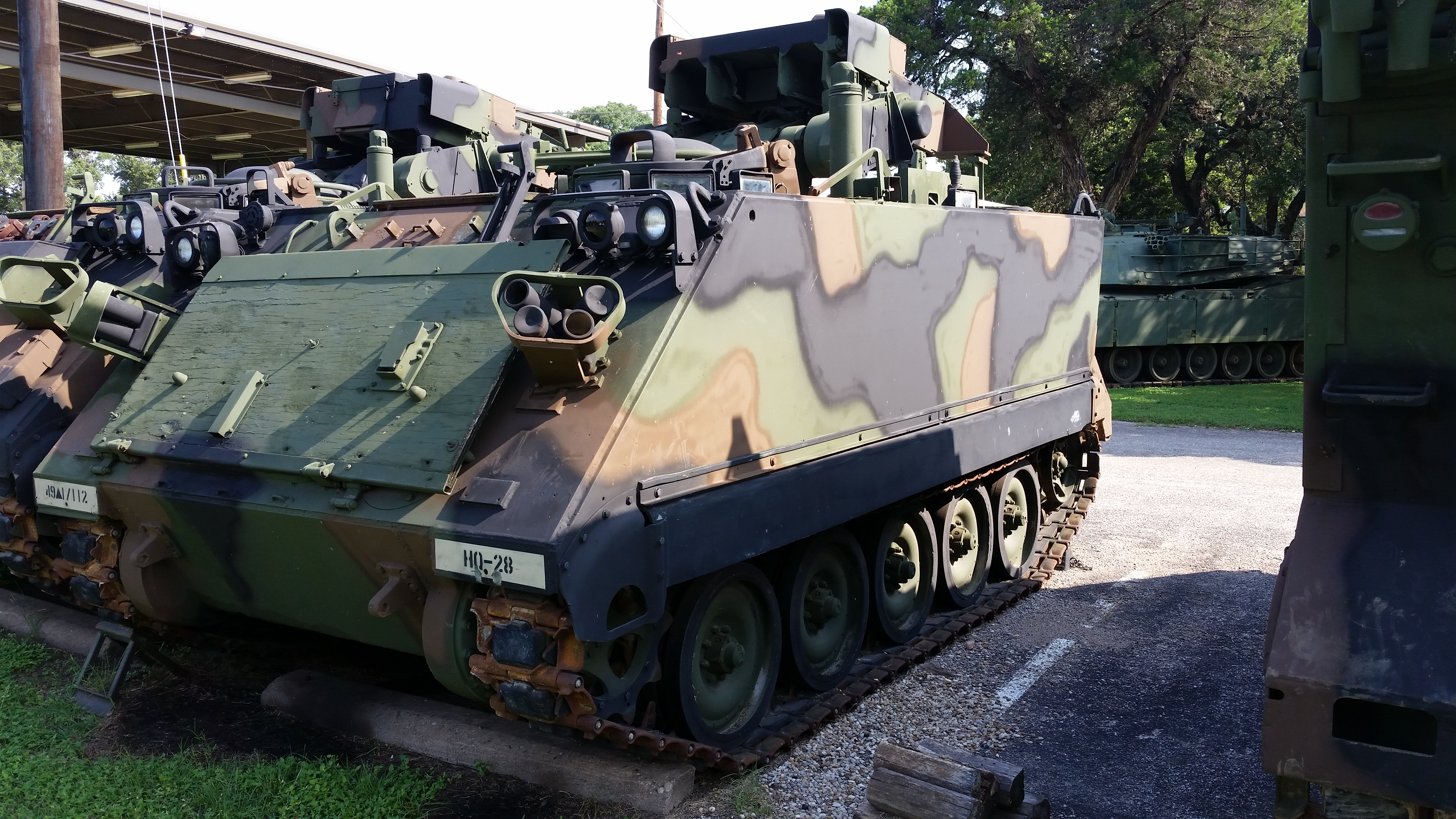
- Type: Fire Support Team Vehicle
- Place of origin: United States

Service history
- In service: 1978–2000
- Wars: Persian Gulf War

Specifications
- Mass: 12 metric tons
- Length: 4.863 m (16.0 ft)
- Width: 2.686 m (8.8 ft)
- Height: 2.940 m (9.6 ft) (targeting head stowed), 3.410 m (11.2 ft) (head extended)
- Crew: 4 (driver, commander, radio operator, turret operator)
- Operational range: 480 km (300 mi)
- Maximum speed: 64 km/h (40 mph)

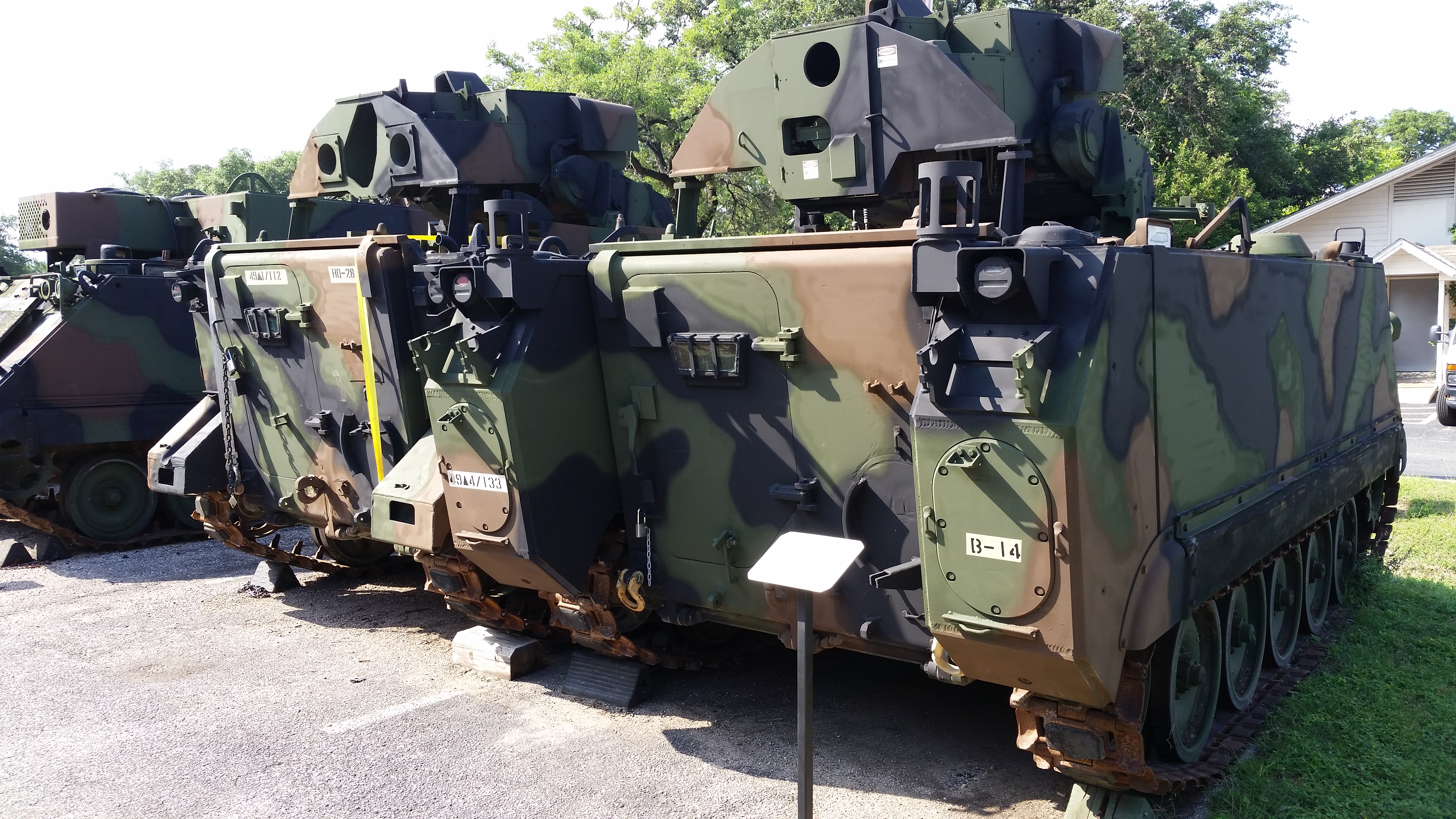
M981 FIST-V (rear)

The M981 FISTV (Fire Support Team Vehicle) is a United States Army armored vehicle designed to house an artillery observer team in mechanized units. It was based on the M901 Improved TOW Vehicle (ITV) – itself based on the ubiquitous M113 armored personnel carrier chassis.

== Equipment ==
The principal equipment on the FISTV is the Ground/Vehicular Laser Locator Designator (G/VLLD), pronounced "glid". This device obtains precise range information to a lased target. When combined with directional control from an inertial navigation system and vehicle coordinates from the GPS, the system is able to obtain precise coordinates of a designated target.

The FISTV also had four SINCGARS radios to track the numerous voice and data radio nets pertinent to fire support operations.

== Employment ==
The FISTV identifies targets and sends their description and location to the Fire Direction Center.

Each armor or mechanized infantry company in the US Army has one M981, with a crew consisting of a lieutenant, a noncommissioned officer, and two soldiers. This crew also serves as advisors to the company commander on fire support issues.

FISTVs are also used by Combat Observation and Lasing Teams (COLTs), a Brigade asset positioned to support the Brigade fires plan.

== History ==
Among its several advantages, the hammerhead could be raised from behind protective terrain or concealing cover. Although gyroscopes had their weaknesses, these systems were replaced or supplemented with other location & positioning systems, such as GPS. Should gyros or technology fail, the crew could also use basic land navigation skills, like triangulating from known terrain features. The FISTV had several limitations, including the vehicle's poor performance compared to the M2 Bradleys and M1 Abrams tanks with which it maneuvered, forcing the other vehicles to wait while the FISTV labored to keep up. Its top-heavy design made it prone to rollovers. The lack of a heavy weapons system or enhanced armor meant that the crew depended solely on the supported element for protection. It could not move with the hammerhead deployed in the raised position and had a planning time of 3 minutes, 30 seconds plus the time it took the north-seeking gyrocompass (NSG) to align.

The M981 FISTV has been supplanted by the M7 Bradley and M1131 Stryker fire support vehicles.

== See also ==
- Field artillery (United States)
- M113 armored personnel carrier variants
