= Ranger Special Operations Vehicle =

U.S. Army light military vehicle

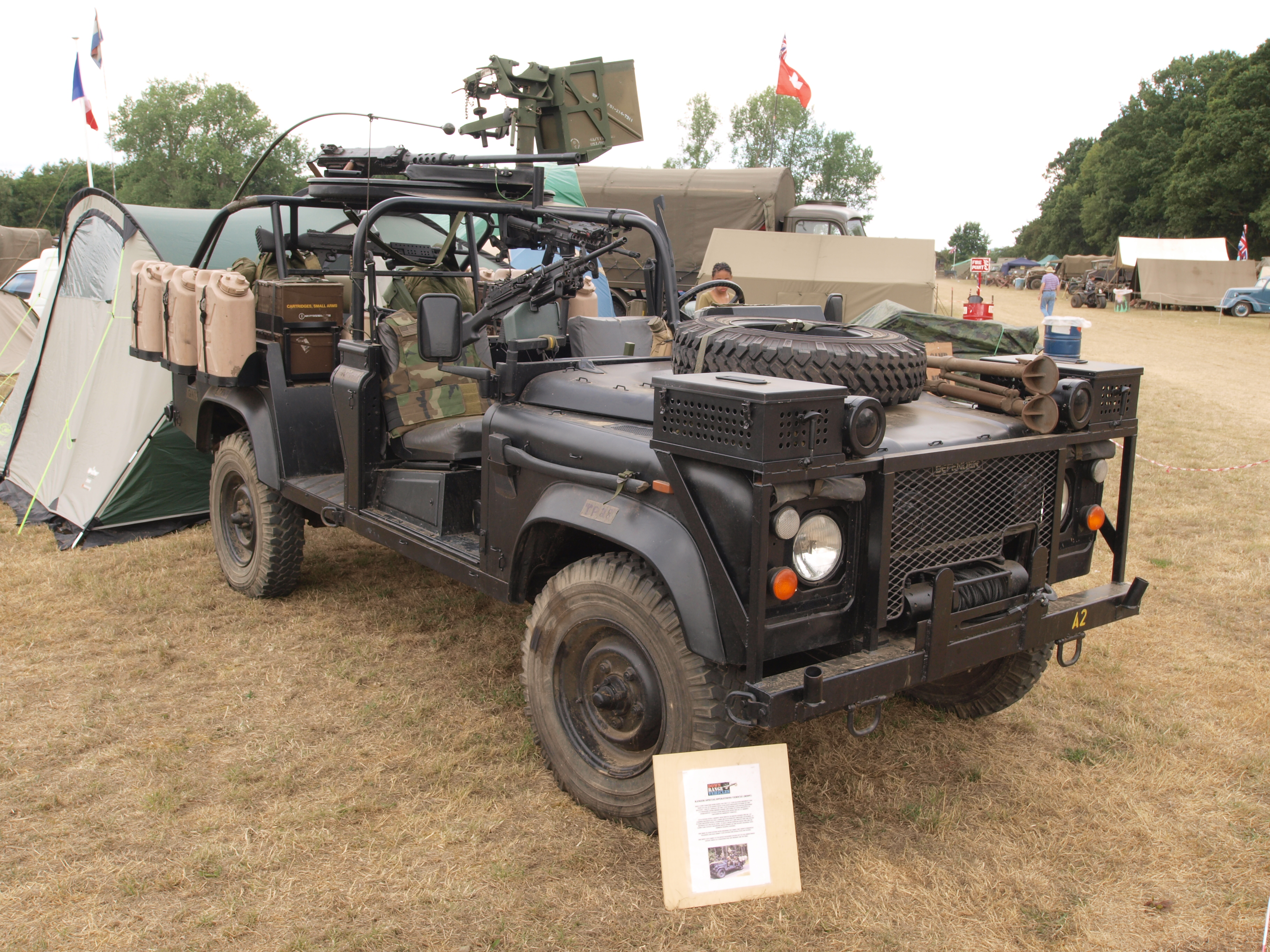
- A Land Rover modified to RSOV configuration at the War and Peace Show 2010 convention.
- Type: Military light utility vehicle
- Place of origin: United States

Service history
- In service: 1992 – Present
- Used by: See Users

Production history
- Manufacturer: Land Rover; Otokar
- Produced: 1992

Specifications
- Mass: 7,734 lb (3,508 kg)
- Length: 173.8 inches (4,415 mm)
- Width: 70.5 inches (1,791 mm)
- Height: 76-inch (1,930 mm) (without gun mount)
- Engine: Four-cylinder turbocharged diesel
- Drive: full-time four-wheel drive
- Transmission: Automatic

The Ranger Special Operations Vehicle (RSOV) is a light military vehicle of the U.S. Army's 75th Ranger Regiment, based on the Land Rover Defender. The RSOV is not meant to be an assault vehicle, but rather a rapid defensive platform.

== History ==
In 1992, the U.S. Army Rangers decided to adopt the RSOV in order to replace their M151 light gun trucks. The decision to adopt the vehicle was inspired by American troops seeing the Land Rover deployed by the British in the Gulf War. They noted that the vehicle was easier to use in desert terrain compared to the Humvee. 60 RSOVs were initially purchased to fulfill a requirement for 12 RSOVs per battalion.

The RSOV was secretly deployed to support potential anti-terrorist efforts and to ensure the safety of people visiting the 1992 Summer Olympics in Spain, but they were kept out of the public eye.

== Design ==
The RSOV's design is based on the Land Rover Defender Model 110, having different specifications from the British Weapons Mount Installation Kit. The RSOV was built by the Land Rover Special Operations Vehicle Department. It was also meant to be airlifted by helicopter or transport aircraft if needed.

Initial prototypes used 3.5 liter V8 engines, but final models used four cylinder turbo diesel engines with a manual transmission. The diesel engine does not make loud noises when deployed, allowing Ranger teams to be stealthy when tasked with seizing places of interest.

The Rangers have three main types of RSOV, the weapons carrier, medical vehicle, or communications vehicle. As a weapons carrier it can carry up to 8,000 lbs, including six to seven fully armed Rangers. The Ranger is designed with a crew of three in mind: a truck commander (TC), seated front-left, a driver, and a top gunner, in the rear. Additional seating arrangements can be made for an antitank operator, radiotelephone operator or a dismount team typically consisting of an M249 squad automatic weapon gunner, M203 gunner and rifleman.

According to Bob Morrison, the development of the RSOV had an influence for the eventual development of the WMIK.

=== Weapons ===
For a typical operation, both vehicles in an RSOV section would be equipped with various machine guns at the forward truck commander's station, with a Mk 19 grenade launcher at the top gunner position in one vehicle, and a Browning .50 cal M2 machine gun mounted on that top position in the other vehicle.

A M249 light machine gun can be mounted in front of the TC seat for the front passenger to use in case of an enemy encounter.

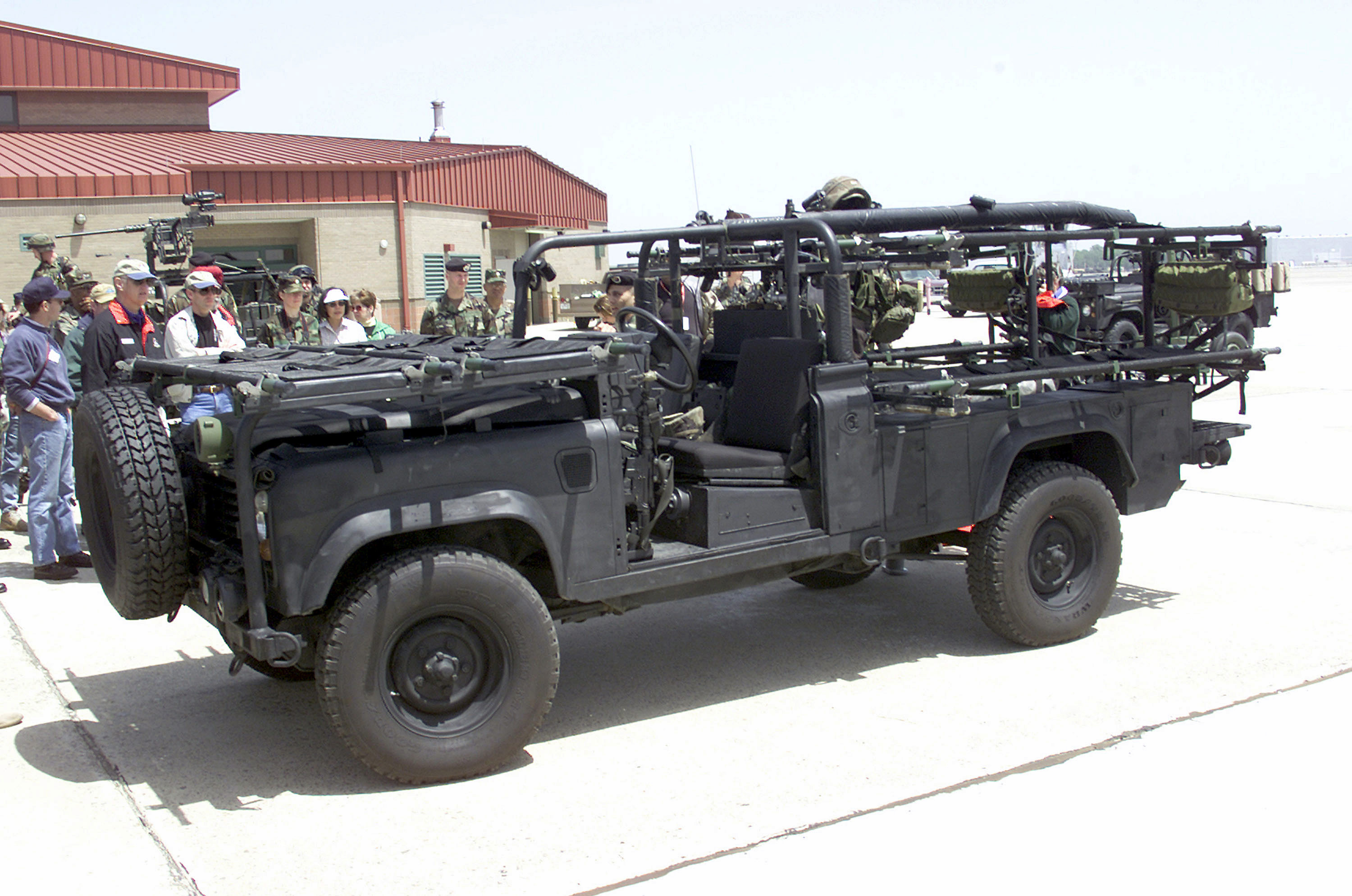
U.S. Army Ranger MEDSOV (Medical Special Operations Vehicle) carries six patient litters, and is based on British Land Rover Defender.

== Variants ==
In addition to the RSOVs with their crew-served weapons, each Ranger battalion has two medical variants of the Defender known as a Medical Special Operations Vehicle (MEDSOV). Instead of the weapon mounts found on standard RSOVs, the MEDSOV variant has fold-down racks capable of carrying six litter patients. Along with its transported casualties, a typical MEDSOV crew would include a driver, a TC and two or three medics to treat the wounded.

Another RSOV variant is used by the Ranger battalion mortar platoon. Known as MORTSOVs, the platoon's two Defenders—they also have three Humvees—replace the top-gun configuration with storage boxes and guy wires that allow the vehicle to carry thirty 120 mm (4.7 in) mortar rounds along with the extra equipment required by the platoon. In addition to its on-board carrying capacity, the MORTSOVs can be used to tow the platoon's 120 mm (4.7 in) mortars.

A RSOV communications variant is also used.

== Users ==
- Czech Republic: Formally known as LAND ROVER DEFENDER – MILITARY ARMOURED 4 with the nickname of Kajman, it entered service in 2009 with modifications done by AMT Defense based on the Defender 130 chassis in a RSOV configuration.
- Israel: Used by special forces of the IDF .
- North Cyprus: Known to be supplied by Turkey to the Security Forces Command.
- Portugal: 13 units used by the Portuguese Army Commandos, it is equipped with a shield at the bottom for protection against improvised explosives, and equipped with a M2 Browning, three Heckler & Koch MG4, one Carl Gustaf and one 60mm Mortar.
- Turkey: 2,550 units produced under license by Otokar, dubbed as "Engerek".
- United States: Used by the 75th Ranger Regiment.

== See also ==
- Interim Fast Attack Vehicle (IFAV) – (United States)
- Long Range Patrol Vehicle – (Australia)
- Land Rover Wolf - Weapons Mount Installation Kit – (United Kingdom)
- Predator SOV
- P6 ATAV – (Indonesia)
- VLEGA Gaucho – (Argentina) / Chivunk – (Brazil)
- FMC XR311 – (United States)
- Light Strike Vehicle – (Singapore)
- General Dynamics Flyer – (United States)
- CS/VP4 ATV – (China)

== Bibliography ==
- Morrison, Bob (January 2000). "Dark Secret: we publish exclusive pictures of the elite US Rangers at work with their unique Land Rovers". Land Rover Monthly.
- Bryant, Russ; Bryant, Susan (2005). Weapons of the U.S. Army Rangers. St. Paul, Minnesota: Zenith Press. ISBN 0760321124.
- King, Andy (August 2012). "Tweaking an RSOV". Model Military International. No. 76. (about the HobbyBox 1:35 model)
