= Land Rover Wolf =

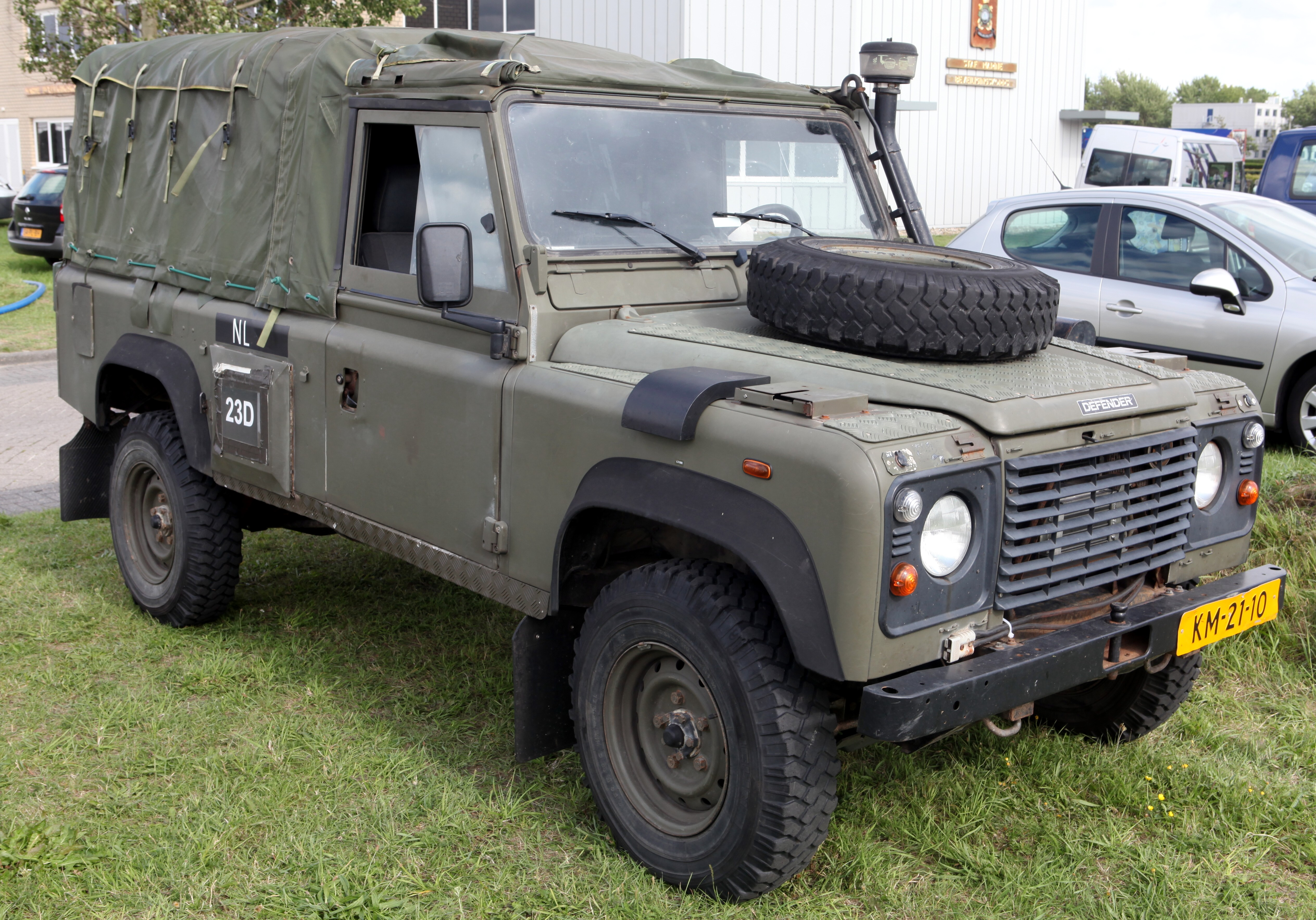
- Dutch Marines Land Rover Defender
- Type: Military light utility vehicle
- Place of origin: United Kingdom

Service history
- In service: 1998–present
- Used by: See Users

Production history
- Manufacturer: Land Rover
- Variants: See Versions

Specifications
- Crew: 2+6 passengers GS (General Service) version 2+0 passengers FFR (Fitted For Radio) version
- Engine: Land Rover 300 TDI engine 83 kW (113 PS; 111 bhp)
- Power/weight: 69 hp/tonne
- Drive: Full-time four-wheel drive
- Transmission: Manual
- Operational range: 510 km (317 mi)

The Land Rover Wolf is a light military vehicle manufactured by Land Rover in the United Kingdom (UK), based on the Land Rover Defender, introduced in 1994. The Ministry of Defence (MoD) designates the Wolf 90 (short wheelbase) as Truck Utility Light (TUL) HS, and the Wolf 110 (long wheelbase) as Truck Utility Medium (TUM) HS, where HS stands for 'High Specification'. Land Rover calls it eXtra Duty (XD).

The 1992 Snatch Land Rover, fitted with composite armour for ballistic protection, does not use the same 'heavy duty' chassis.

== History ==
The Wolf was marketed in other countries than the UK, but many foreign military Land Rover procurement agencies felt they did not need the extra strength and reliability of the Wolf because the older models had passed their own testing, and Wolf was too expensive.

The vehicles have become a symbol of British forces in Iraq and Afghanistan. In keeping with their hearts and minds philosophy, they were chosen for patrol duties instead of armoured fighting vehicles such as the Warrior infantry fighting vehicle. Following a spate of incidents, there has been concern that the unarmoured nature of the Wolf exposes the crews to excessive danger, and they are being supplemented by more heavily armoured vehicles such as the Vector, the Mastiff, and the Jackal.

The Ministry of Defence (MoD) later supplemented the Wolf in theatre with a range of armoured vehicles, including the Snatch and Pinzgauer ATV in some utility and liaison roles, and the Supacat MWMIK. There were reports that some of this equipment was to be sold at below cost once operations in Iraq were completed as the Treasury had refused to cover the cost of replacement.

In Afghanistan, "an average of one of these vehicles a week" was lost to enemy action, and with replacements often arriving late, a "fifth of the fleet" of WMIKs was currently "damaged or has been destroyed by enemy fire".

The MoD has sold off most of the fleet of Wolf 90 Land Rovers because the Bowman radio system is too heavy for it. The 110 version remains in service.

== Design ==
The Wolf was tested, rejected, upgraded, and tested again, before the Ministry of Defence was satisfied. It is far stronger and more reliable than the Land Rover Defender on which it was based. James Arbuthnot, the then Minister of State for Defence Procurement, testified to the rigorous trials the Land Rover went through prior to being adopted in the British military:

"The Land Rover vehicle, known commercially as Defender XD, has been subjected to extensive and rigorous trialling in order to ensure that it can meet the high standards of reliability which are essential for operational military vehicles. Therefore, I am pleased to have been able to announce earlier today that, subject to the satisfactory completion of contractual negotiations, I propose to place an order with Land-Rover for about 8,000 vehicles. That order is worth about £170 million. It will bring substantial industrial and employment benefits to Land-Rover, and enhance the vehicle's already excellent prospects in export markets."

=== Engine choice ===
When the Wolf was designed, the diesel engine in the civilian Defenders was the Td5. The Ministry of Defence preferred the 300 TDI for the Wolf because the electronics in the Td5 were more complex to manage in the field.

The 300 TDI on a Wolf uses a slightly different design of timing cover compared to the civilian version.

=== Reinforced rear axle ===
The testing was extremely rigorous, and Salisbury axles kept breaking. The axle was therefore redesigned using stronger internals, hubs, and outer casing, making one of the strongest Land Rover axles ever made.

=== Fibreglass roof ===
The fibreglass roof was far simpler to manufacture over the raised height of the roof-bars than the Defender aluminium roof. The production was outsourced.

=== Side-mounted spare wheel ===
Everywhere else where Land Rover tried to mount the spare wheel caused the mountings to break free, and it was too heavy for the bonnet. There are three versions of mounting: soft top, hard top, and quick release.

=== Chassis ===
The chassis is considerably different in design from the standard Defender chassis, even though it looks similar. The side walls are standard, most of the rest is bespoke. The additional rear load bed mounting was to take increased weights as the standard chassis kept punching big dents in the rear floor.

Chassis made after the production run (service chassis) are slightly different, later ones have a triangular reinforcement behind the front outriggers, none of them have the front round tube going through the main chassis walls as it is more costly to tool and produce although it is stronger.

The chassis wasn't galvanised to avoid the additional cost. There were also unfounded Health and Safety (H&S) concerns about the gases involved in welding a galvanised chassis, due to the fact that supplying correct respiratory protection to welders would negate this problem.

WMIKs made from the factory had two outriggers in the middle of the chassis instead of just one on a standard Wolf chassis. The second outrigger is to take the extra load of the gun mounting. Many WMIKs were converted from Wolfs and kept one outrigger.

The chassis on all Wolfs was sprayed internally with Dinitrol rust-proofing wax fluid.

=== Tyres ===
Goodyear G90s were designed for the project, and strengthened on the sidewalls in testing. The Michelin tyres were felt to be better, but more expensive; and classed as an approved second choice as used on Winterised / Waterproofed Wolfs. Goodyear G90 tyres have been in service on military vehicles for over 20 years. Wolf wheels were the HD wheels available on Defender at the time. Aftermarket wolf wheels are available and are a popular conversion.

=== Side lockers ===
Experience from the pre Wolf military Defender showed that full jerry cans were dangerous and too tight in the lockers, the unusual shaped doors were simply to take full jerry cans more easily. They were never meant to be watertight.

The Wolf 90 does not have side lockers but does have mountings to carry jerry cans internally.

=== Other Wolf specific items ===
Wolfs are equipped with a steering guard, to offer improved cross country capability.

To keep in line with MoD policy to simplify the stores chain, Wolf vehicles were fitted with 24 volt electrics. This meant supply of simple electrical items such as bulbs was now the same as the rest of the vehicle fleet. FFR (fitted for radio) variants gained a second alternator specifically to power the signals equipment.

A rear body roll cage was fitted in all conventionally bodied vehicles, and some Wolfs were later upgraded with an extra front roll cage. It is worth noting that this 'roll cage' is not mounted to the chassis, merely the rear body tub, and has questionable benefit were the vehicle subjected to being rolled over. The specially designed ambulance bodied Wolfs have no such protection.

To reduce noise and heat from the transmission in compliance with health and safety rules, a special heavy duty matting system was designed for the Wolf by 'Wright Off-Road'. These mats weigh approximately 30 kilograms (66 pounds), and consist of mats to cover the footwells and transmission tunnel. Not all Wolfs have these mats.

The Wolf soft top is made of PVC, and the rear flap is fastened either by zippers and Velcro, or by Dutch lacing down the sides, and elasticated straps to cleats on the tailgate.

== Versions ==
The Ministry of Defence procured at least 97 different versions; the basic versions are:

- Air drop
- Commanders IK
- Field Ambulance
- Fitted For Radio (FFR)
- Helicopter Support Platform
- Tropical Field Ambulance
- Waterised Weapons Mounted Installation Kit (WWMIK)
- Weapons Mounted Installation Kit (WMIK)
- Winterised
- Winterised / Waterproofed
- Winterised / Waterproofed Field Ambulance

Waterproofed versions have a snorkel that allows the vehicle to wade through water up to windscreen level. Winterised versions are fitted with an engine fluids heater to pre-warm the engine, a heated windscreen, and heaters in the rear cabin.

The Royal Marines operate the waterproofed version for amphibious assaults. Fitted with a 'periscope' snorkel, waterproofed electrical systems and instruments, and prepared with grease and graphite lubricant on practically every moving part, these versions can run with the entire vehicle submerged if needed. The tailgate is held open by struts to allow water into the vehicle to prevent it floating away, and to allow water to rapidly drain after reaching the shore. In training exercises, the vehicles are operated in depths so that the driver's head and shoulders are clear of the water.

Alongside the HS / Wolf programme, the MoD ran a design project for a new battlefield ambulance vehicle, known as Project Pulse. This was also won by Land Rover, with a version of the ultra-long wheelbase Defender 130. Whilst not officially a 'Wolf', the 130 ambulances (with bodies by Marshall Aerospace) used the same chassis and transmission upgrades, identical drivetrains, and the same Defender-based front bodywork.

=== Weapons Mount Installation Kit ===
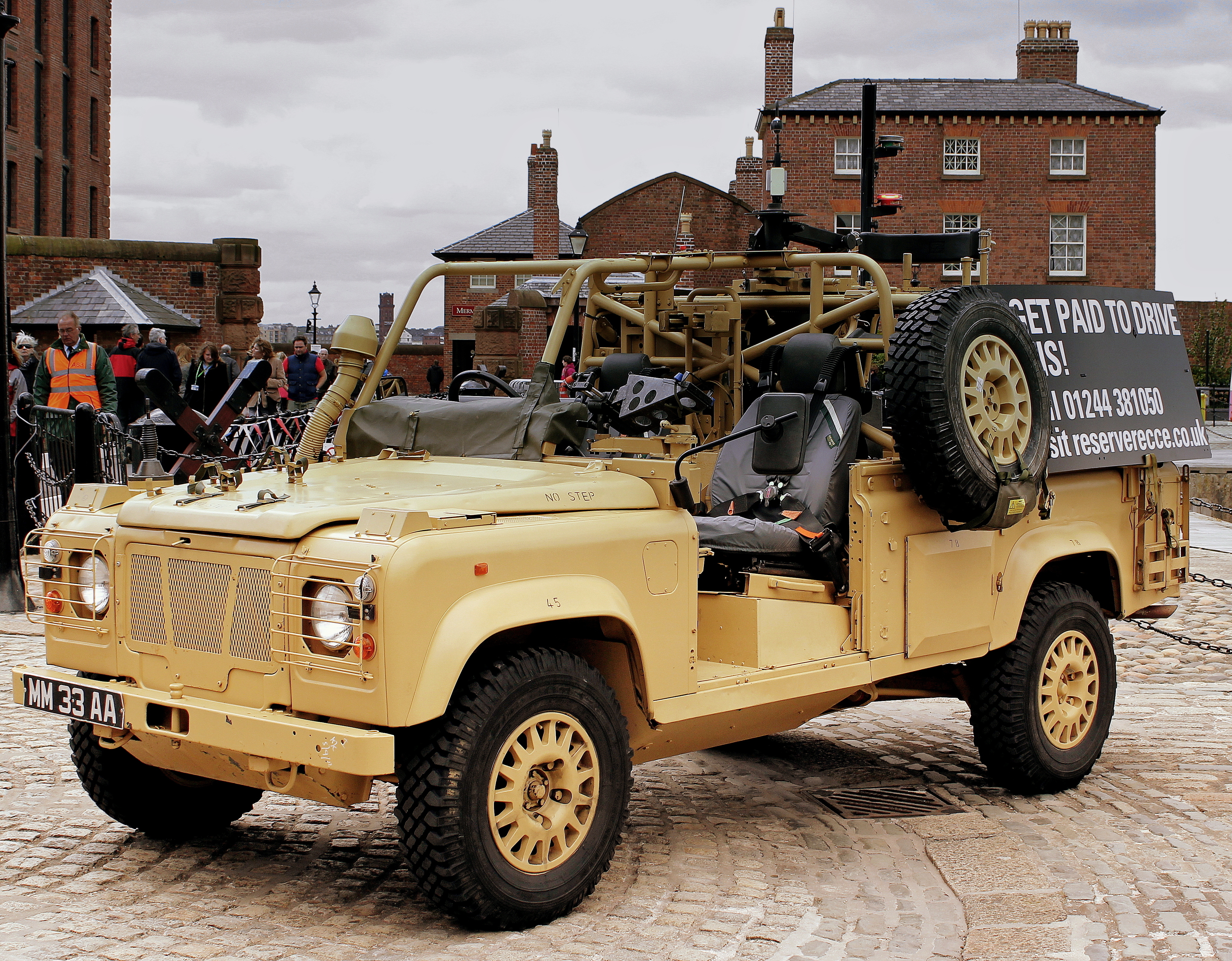
A static British Army WMIK on display

A variant of TUM is the Weapons Mount Installation Kit (WMIK, pronounced 'Wimik') for use as reconnaissance and close fire support vehicles. WMIKs are manufactured jointly by Land Rover and Ricardo plc, and feature a strengthened chassis and are stripped down, fitted with roll cages and weapon mounts. Initial development started in 1997 as a rapid deployment vehicle concept. Some models were initially used in Sierra Leone in Operation Palliser. The first production vehicles were made in 2002 as prototypes to demonstrate to potential clients.

Typically, the vehicle will carry one 12.7 mm Heavy Machine Gun (HMG) or 7.62 mm General Purpose Machine Gun (GPMG) (or, on occasion, the MILAN ATGM while it was still in service) on the rear ring-mount, with an additional pintle-mounted GPMG on the front passenger side. According to Ricardo, it can be modified to install a GIAT 20 mm cannon.

In late 2006, the MoD announced it was purchasing forty new belt-fed Automatic Lightweight Grenade Launchers (ALGL) made by Heckler and Koch (HK GMG), that can fire up to 360 grenades per minute, with an effective range of 1.5 kilometres (0.93 miles), and a maximum range of up to 2.2 kilometres (1.4 miles); they are to be mounted on WMIKs in Afghanistan.

==== Upgrades ====
In the REMUS project, the Ministry of Defence upgraded its Wolf fleet with Front Roll Over Protection System, rear retracting seat belts, Wright off-road front and rear anti vibration acoustic matting, wax injection of chassis / bulkhead, and chassis underseal.

Later upgrades were made, with the first one in 2006, 2009, and 2010. Another upgrade made in 2011, has resulted in the designation RWMIK+, with R meaning 'Revised'. This was made in response to incident where British WMIKs were being targeted by insurgents through IEDs and rocket launchers.

== Civilian usage ==
=== UK ===
A fleet of Wolf-specification Defender 110 hard-top models were built for the proposed Land Rover TransGlobal expedition in 1998. These vehicles were essentially arctic-prepared military models (with 24-volt electrics, convoy lighting, military-spec air intakes, internal insulation, and the standard Wolf chassis and suspension upgrades), combined with expedition gear, such as winches, a roof rack, roof-mounted tent, roll cage, etc. A hydraulic power take-off system was also fitted, intended for powering the vehicles across the Bering Strait on catamaran rafts.

The expedition was cancelled only days before the planned departure date, and most of the fleet were auctioned off to the general public. These distinctive vehicles (as well as their high level of equipment, they are painted in the TransGlobal's gold livery) are desirable expedition vehicles, and several have been used on long-range trips by private owners, including Land Rover's own Fifty 50 challenge, and the Lone Wolf Transglobal Expedition.

Small numbers of ex-military Wolfs have also entered the civilian market. These are usually examples that were crash-damaged in military service and auctioned off, to be rebuilt by their new owners.

=== Germany ===
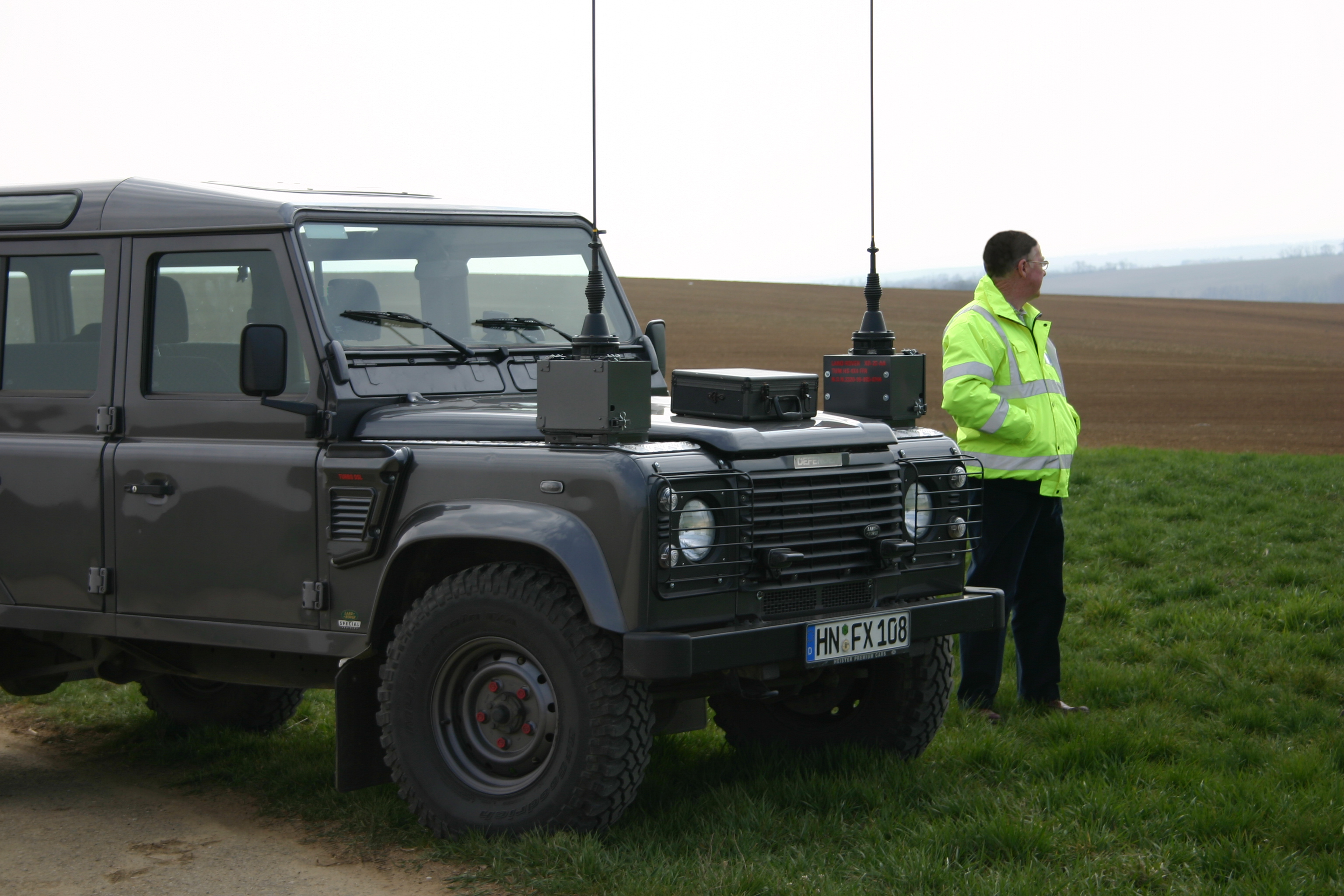
Wolf as used by German government agencies

In 2003, the German government placed an order for a fleet of Land Rover Wolf vehicles for security and law enforcement forces. The fleet consisted of high capacity pick-ups, vans, and station wagons. All fleet vehicles were ordered in Bonatti Grey with white roofs (last batch vehicles had grey roofs), and the electrical systems were kept to a minimum with all luxury items such as electric windows, heated seats, radar detector omitted for simplicity. Vehicles were supplied as a mixture of 12 and 24 volt FFR variants, their powerplants being either the standard Td5 turbodiesel engine, or some 3 litre BMW units. The contract was cancelled in late 2004 after the German government opted for one with Mercedes Benz who supplied their G-Class (the military version is also called 'Wolf') in various forms, and a small number of these last batch vehicles were imported and immediately sold-off to the private market.

== Users ==
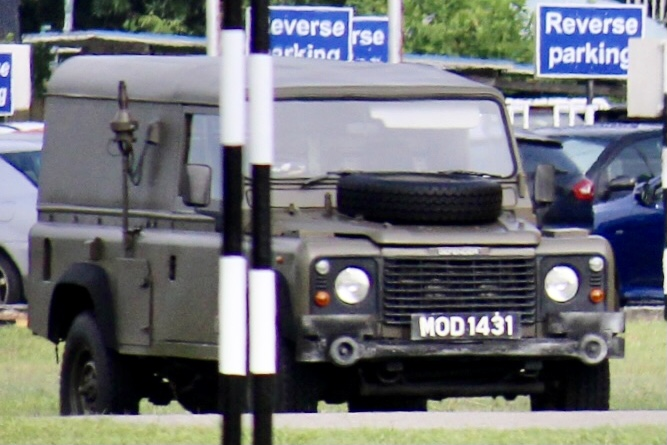
Wolf in service with the Royal Brunei Armed Forces in 2022

- Australia: uses the Land Rover 110 version, the major differences between the Land Rover Perentie and British Land Rovers are the relocation of the spare wheel to a position under the rear of the load area, a galvanised chassis, and the Isuzu engine.
- Brunei: several vehicles in active service with the Royal Brunei Land Force (RBLF), and used for ceremonial purposes.
- Czech Republic: formally known as Land Rover Defender – Military Armoured 4, it entered service in 2009 with modifications done by AMT Defence, based on the Defender 130 chassis in Ranger Special Operations Vehicle (RSOV) and WMIK-based configurations. Standard weapons configurations consist of one NSV/PKB machine gun, two PKBs or one AGS-17 AGL and one PKB.
- Italy: known to be used by Carabinieri forces.
- Lebanon: 100 former British Army RWMIK+ vehicles supplied by the United Kingdom as donations to the Lebanese Army.
- Lithuania: used Ricardo-based WMIK modded from Defender chassis; these were used by Vytautas the Great Jaeger Battalion operators, produced between 2005 and 2007. Lithuanian WMIKs have a fourth seat for a rear gunner, Plasan-made mine blast armoured system, 24V radio supply with Electro Magnetic Compatibility (EMC) suppressor, self-recovery winch, and Oxley infrared light.
- Netherlands: Netherlands Marine Corps uses Ricardo-based WMIKs modded from the Defender chassis.
- United Kingdom: Defender 110-based R-WMIK+ vehicles used by the Royal Irish Regiment. 16 Air Assault Brigade forces used WMIKs since 2000. Known to be used in Operation Telic and Operation Palliser.
- Uruguay: acquired 100 Defender-110-based vehicles in 2012 in a contract against the Marrua. In 2019, 54 of them were being sold on a swapping basis.

== See also ==
- Land Rover Defender
- Land Rover Perentie
- Peugeot P4
- Pindad Maung
- VLEGA Gaucho / Chivunk
- FMC XR311
- Mercedes-Benz G-Class

== Bibliography ==
- Burr, Tim (2009). Support to High Intensity Operations. London, England: Stationery Office. ISBN 978-0102954999.
