= Undercoat =

Undercoat may refer to:

- Down hair, or underfur, of an animal
- Primer (paint), applied to a surface before the visible final coat of paint will be applied

== See also ==
- Underseal, thick resilient coating applied to the underbody or chassis of an automobile to protect against impact damage from small stones
- Overcoat (disambiguation)
