= M1161 Growler =

M1161 Growler internally transportable vehicle
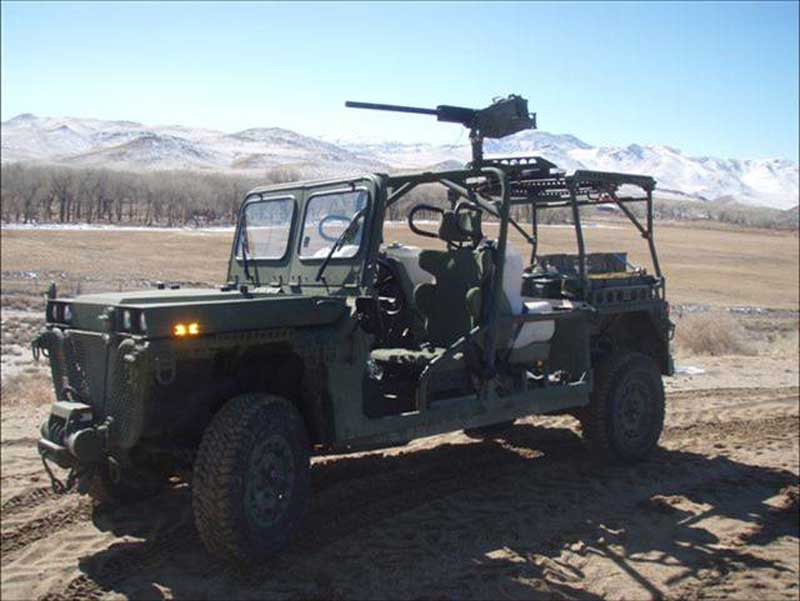
- U.S. Marine Corps M1161 Growler ITV-LSV
- Type: Fast attack / light utility vehicle
- Place of origin: United States

Service history
- In service: 2009–present
- Used by: United States Marine Corps

Production history
- Designer: American Growler
- Designed: 1999
- Manufacturer: Growler Manufacturing and Engineering
- Unit cost: $209,000 USD scout, $1,078,000 USD mortar combination
- Produced: 2009–present
- Variants: M1163 prime mover expeditionary fire support system (EFSS)

Specifications
- Mass: Curb 2,058 kg (4,537 lb) or 3,872 kg (8,536 lb) with maximum payload
- Length: 4.14 m (163 in)
- Width: 1.5 m (59 in)
- Height: 1.19 m (47 in) stowed, 1.84 m (72 in) standard road height and 1.92 m (76 in) at maximum clearance
- Crew: 1 driver, 3 passengers
- Armor: Kevlar frag-resistant seats
- Main armament: M2HB .50cal BMG machine gun
- Secondary armament: M240G 7.62mm MG or Mk19 40mm automatic grenade launcher
- Engine: 2.8 Liter In-line 4-cylinder OHV 12-valve turbo-diesel (Navistar Defense); 132 bhp @ 3,600 rpm / 230 ft lbs torque @ 2,000 rpm
- Payload capacity: 900 kg (2,000 lb) cross-country
- Transmission: General Motors 4L70E 4-speed automatic transmission with overdrive, Chrysler 2-speed manual transfer case (2WD Hi/Lo and 4WD Hi/Lo)
- Suspension: Air ride gas bladder suspension, height-adjustable in the field via dash control panel
- Fuel capacity: 91 litres (24 US gal) via twin 45 litres (12 US gal) fuel tanks using JP-8, commercial diesel, DF-2 or JP-5
- Operational range: 657 km (408 mi) unrefueled
- Maximum speed: 137 km/h (85 mph) maximum on paved roads, 105 km/h (65 mph) cross-country
- Steering system: Four wheel steering via joystick control with auto-centering

The M1161 Growler is officially the Internally Transportable Light Strike Vehicle (ITV-LSV) designed specifically for use with the V-22 Osprey tiltrotor aircraft. The M1161 and M1163 were the only tactical vehicles certified to fly in the V-22. Fulfilling multiple roles of light utility, light strike and fast attack vehicle, the M1161 Growler is smaller than most international vehicles in the same role. It has taken over duties of the M151 jeep-type variants and replaced the Interim Fast Attack Vehicle (IFAV).

A separate US Marine Corps variant, the shorter two-seat M1163 prime mover is combined with the M327 towed 120 mm heavy mortar, and also became its ammunition hauler after the M1162 trailer was cancelled.

== History ==
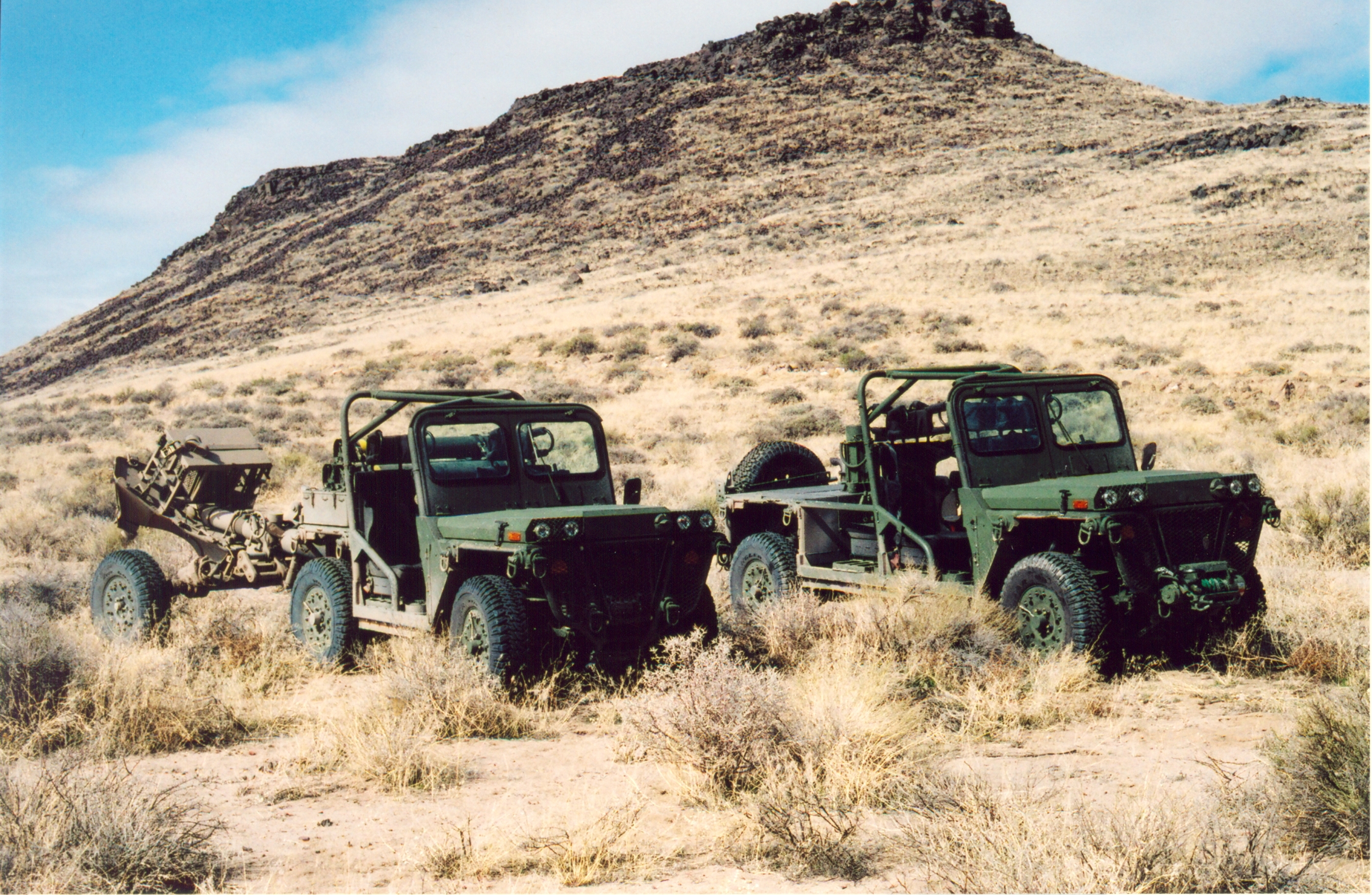
M1163 Prime Mover with towed M327 mortar, and M1161 ITV-LSV Growler variants

Development for the Growler began in 1999 by American Growler when the Marine Corps sought a vehicle that could be transported in a V-22 Osprey. Though the initial design used elements and parts from the drive train of the M151 which it was intended to replace, the final design featured entirely new parts and systems to allow it to fulfill its mission. This included allowing it to fit within the confines of a V-22's cargo bay. No major components from the M151 design are used in the manufacture of the M1161 or M1163 variant. Initial engineering of the M1161 is most closely related to American Growler's commercial UV 100 DB off-road vehicle. Manufacture of the Growler variants was later transferred to General Dynamics facilities, but are otherwise identical.

== Development ==
Two different versions of the Growler were developed; the M1161 light strike vehicle (LSV), and the M1163 prime mover variant as part of the Expeditionary Fire Support System (EFSS) towed heavy 120 mm mortar. A number of the separate 36-round ammunition trailers, the M1162, were ordered, but further design was dropped and its duties to carry the 35 lb mortar shells were incorporated into the M1163 Prime Mover. The M1161 LSV variant is armed with either an M2HB .50cal BMG machine gun, M240G 7.62mm MG or Mk19 40 mm automatic grenade launcher. The 120 mm mortar towed by the M1163 Prime Mover is the French RT-120, deployed by United States forces as the M327 Dragon Fire. The Growler's central role of cross-country scout and aerially-deployed forward unit has led to further modifications, including use of the rifled precision extended range munition (PERM) system.

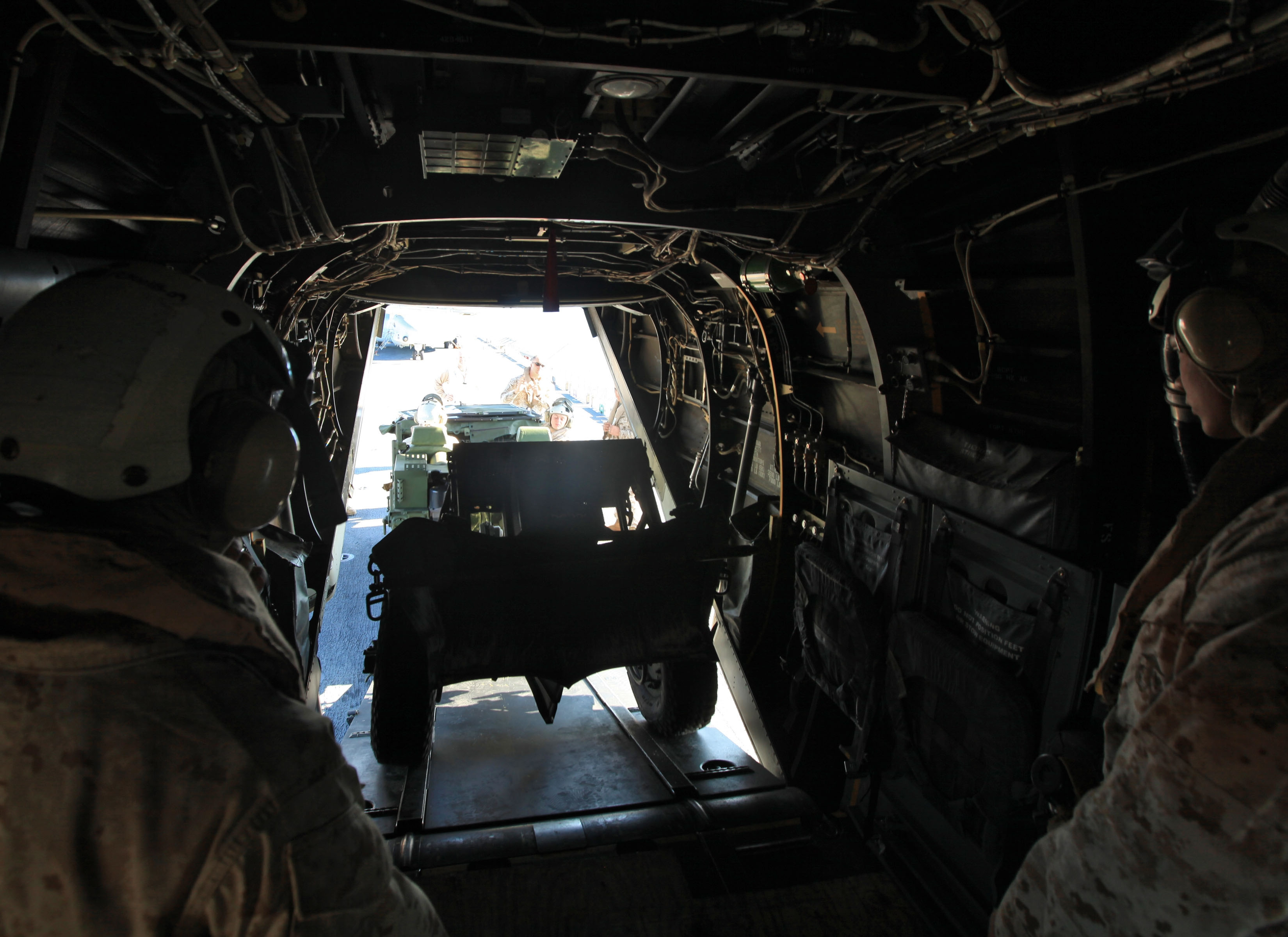
M327 towed 120mm heavy mortar and M1163 Growler back into an MV-22 Osprey on board USS Iwo Jima.

On November 10, 2004, the Marine Corps Systems Command (MCSC) awarded indefinite-delivery, indefinite-quantity contract M67854-05-D-6014 with firm-fixed-price and cost-plus-award-fee contract line-item numbers for a base year and up to six option years to General Dynamics Ordnance and Tactical Systems (GDOTS) for $12,057,159 for procurement of 66 EFSSs and up to 650 ITVs. The MCSC selected GDOTS over two other offerors. On September 20, 2007, Senator Carl Levin, Chairman of the Senate Committee on Armed Services filed a protest on behalf of a constituent, Rae-Beck Automotive, LLC, a subcontractor to one of the losing offerors. The DOD inspector general's audit did not substantiate most of the constituent’s concerns, but did note concerns with the MCSC program management and contract award for the EFSS and ITV programs.

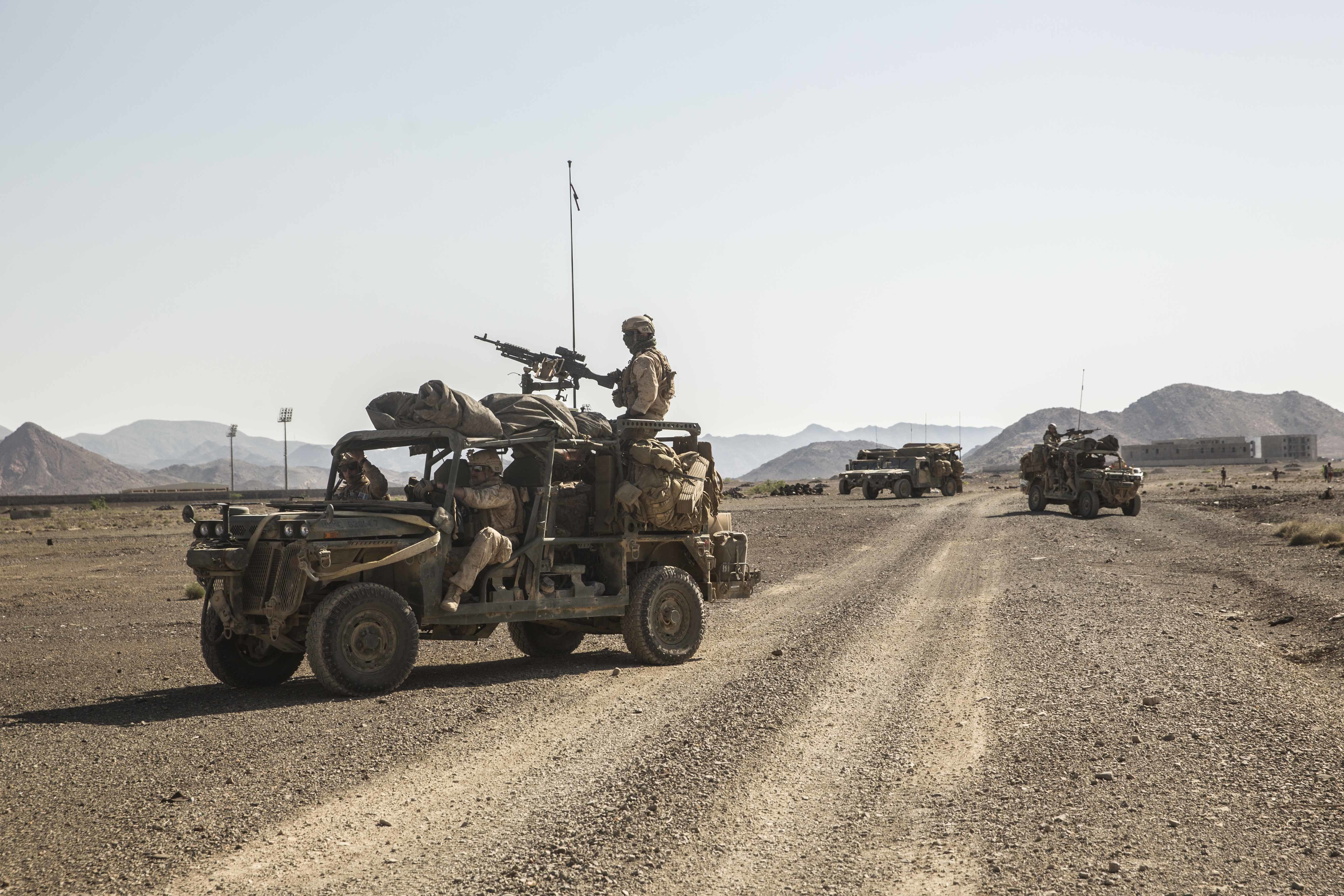
M1161 Growler ITV with the 15th Marine Expeditionary Unit’s Force Reconnaissance Detachment in Djibouti, 2015.

By 2008, unit cost had risen by 120%, leaving each Growler scout variant with a cost of $209,000 per unit. The prime mover mortar contract price rose by 86%, to $1,078,000 cost per unit. The first Growlers were deployed to Marine units in January 2009 for field testing, one year beyond the contracted delivery date. By August 2011, 209 M1161s and 102 M1163s had been produced, with 42 additional M1163s on order. Eventually, 266 M1161 ITVs and another 145 "prime mover" variants were purchased. The vehicles saw combat with elements of MARSOC in Afghanistan from 2011-2014.

Problems with M1161 and M1163's throttle system were identified in May 2012 following an accident at MCB Camp Pendleton, California. The entire vehicle fleet was grounded, pending repair.

During RIMPAC 2014, the Marines fitted a Growler ITV with Torc Robotics' Ground Unmanned Support Surrogate (GUSS) system, turning it into an unmanned ground vehicle. The GUSS system's aim is to lighten troops' loads by carrying up to 1,600 lb (730 kg) of equipment; it can also serve as an unmanned medical evacuation vehicle. A GUSS-equipped ITV can autonomously follow a person wearing a beacon at a predetermined distance while cruising at up to 8 mph (13 km/h). A Marine can take direct control of the vehicle through a robotic controller or switch it to manual operation and drive it themselves if needed. The unmanned ITV may be fielded within five years.

== Replacement ==
In June 2012, the United States Special Operations Command (USSOCOM) expressed interest in procuring Non Developmental Item (NDI) vehicles that would be highly mobile, V-22 transportable platforms. The Marines are seeking a replacement for the Growler ITV, running parallel with SOCOM's efforts to develop a new Osprey-transportable vehicle. The effort comes from higher demand in operations and the service's Expeditionary Force 21 concept, which emphasizes lighter forces. Quick-reaction Marine expeditionary units typically deploy with as many as 20 ITVs.

A limited objective experiment and technical assessment was conducted by the Marine Corps Warfighting Laboratory in September 2015 to define the need and find vehicles to fill it, performing missions ranging from light strike to logistics and casualty evacuation. The conclusion was that the ITV vehicles were ineffective as a strike vehicle, but worked well as a logistics vehicle by removing a lot of weight from Marines' backs.

Manufactured between 2004 and 2010, Growler ITV procurement and fielding was ineffectively timed since operations in Iraq and Afghanistan led to most units relying on armored vehicles because of the threat of roadside bombs. Originally intended for infantry, Growlers were fielded primarily with reconnaissance, marine special operations, and artillery communities. A new ITV would be fielded with infantry forces to serve company-sized landing teams. Although designed for light strike, experiments have shown an ITV's greatest roles to be casualty evacuation (CASEVAC) and logistics to lighten individuals' loads. Replacement efforts were anticipated to begin in 2018.

== Civilian Sales ==
In February 2019, GovPlanet announced that it will be selling the ITV Growlers to the public for the first time. Growlers will be sold by public auction in March 2019.

== Gallery ==
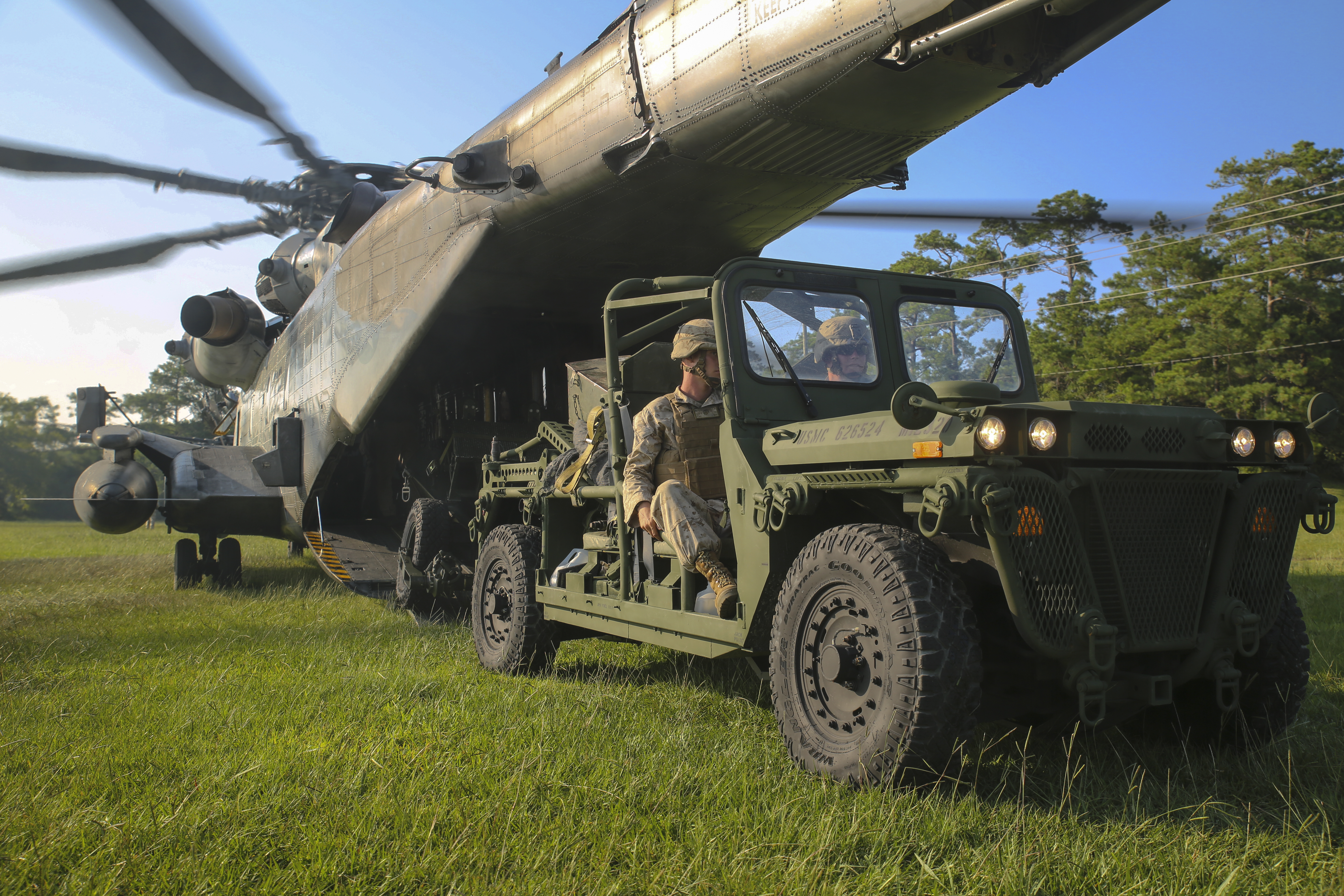
Aerial Raid Training with M1161 Growler

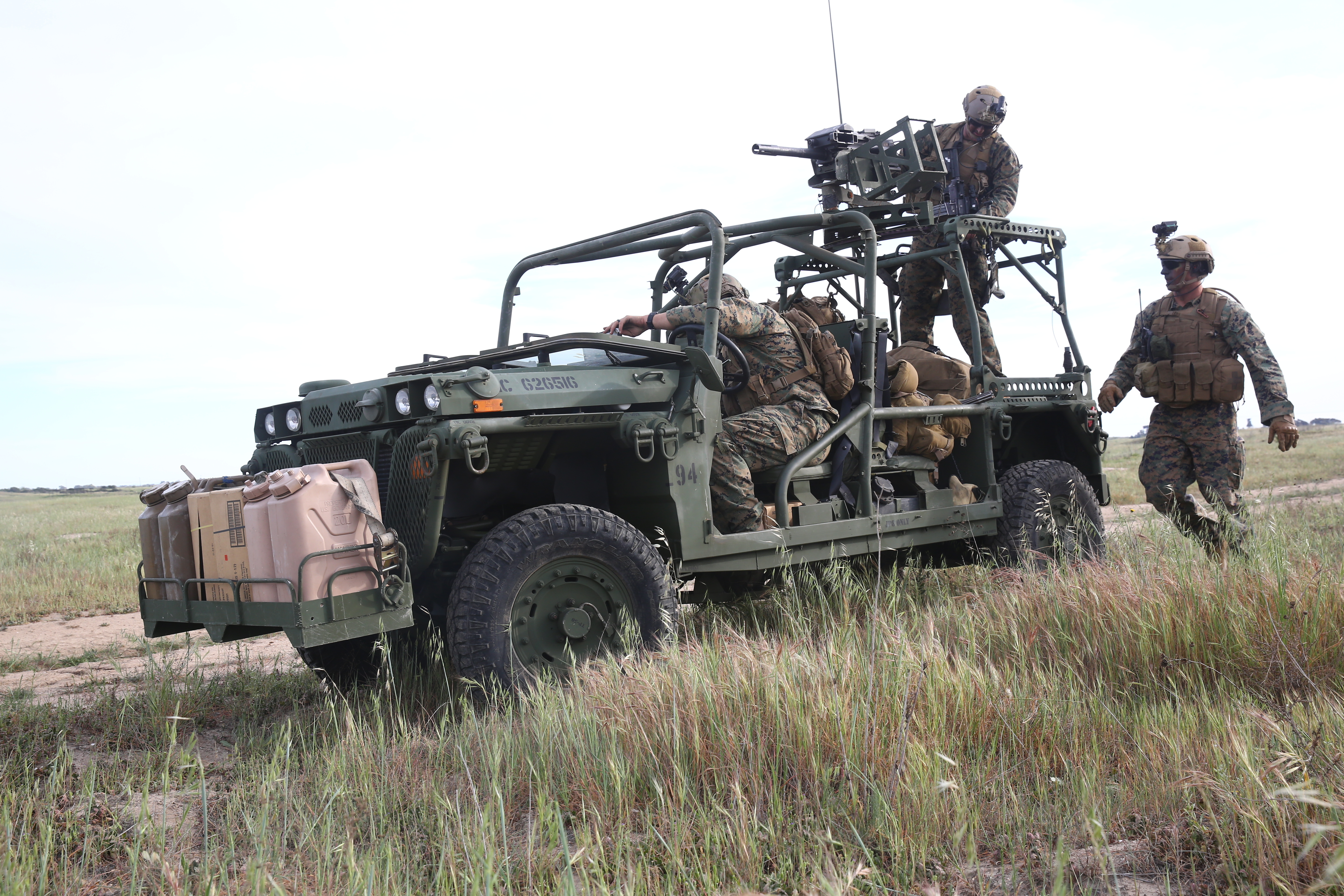
M1161 Growler ITV with 1st Reconnaissance Battalion

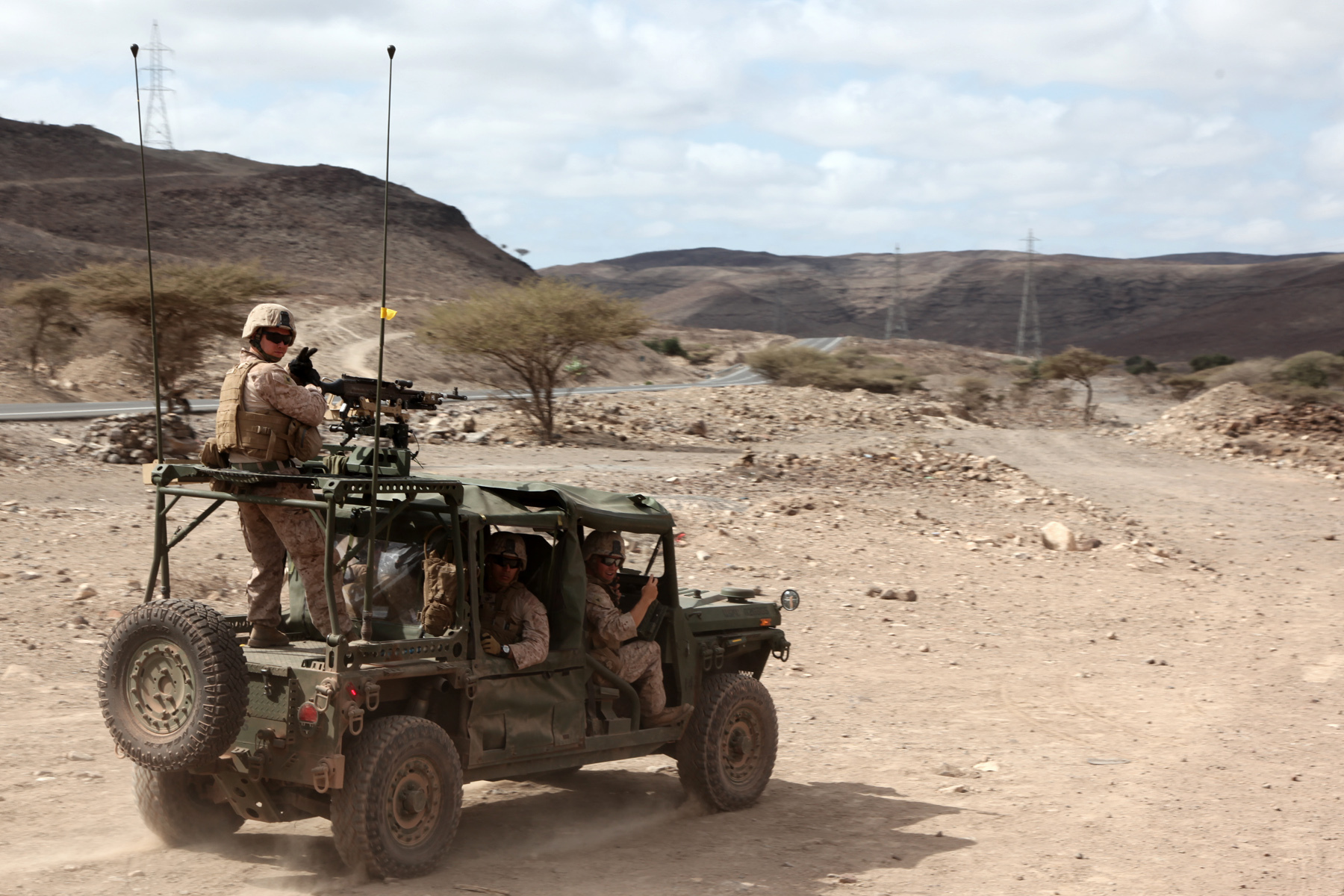
M1161 Growler ITV with 15th Marine Expeditionary Unit

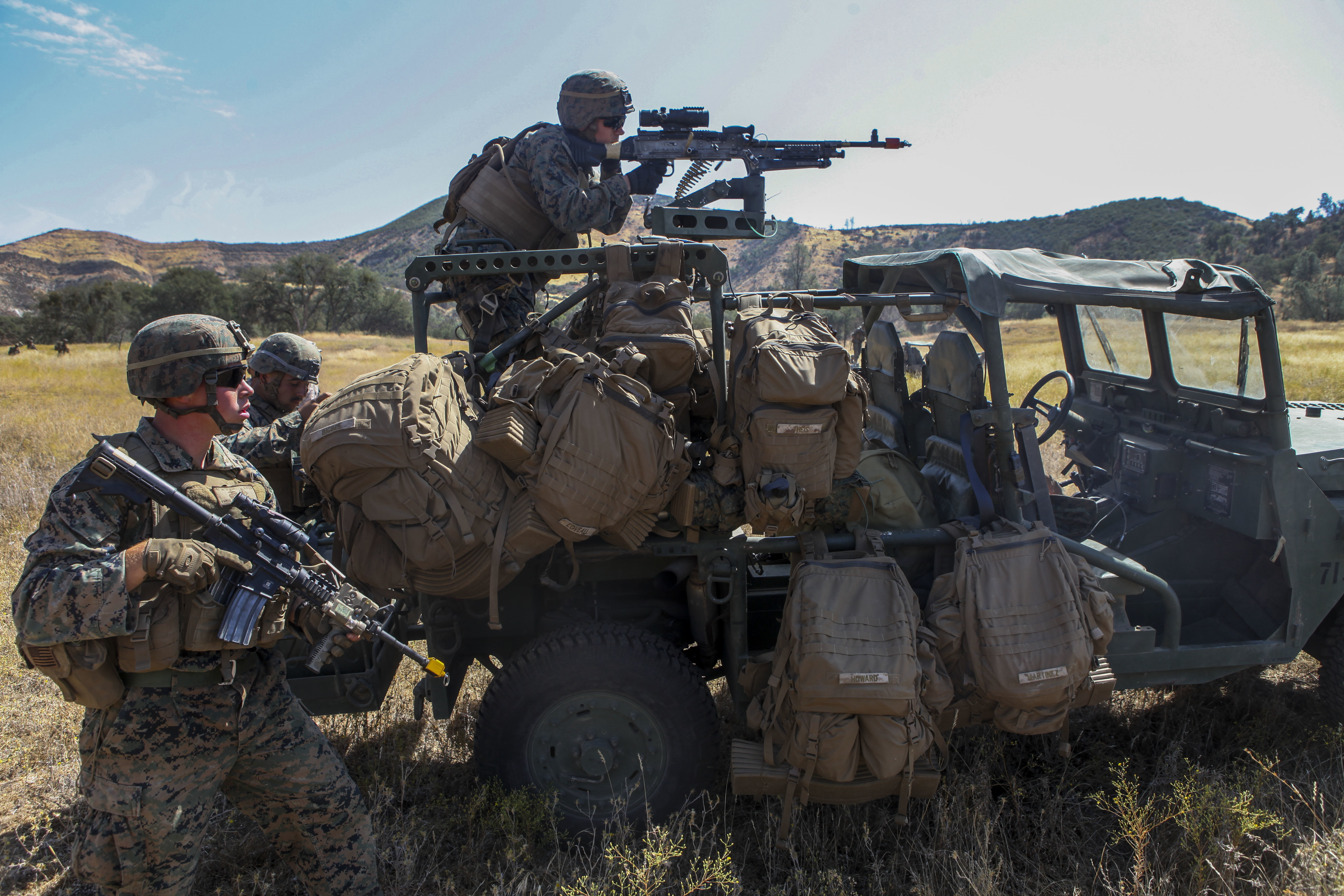
M1161 Growler ITV with 1st Battalion, 1st Marine Regiment

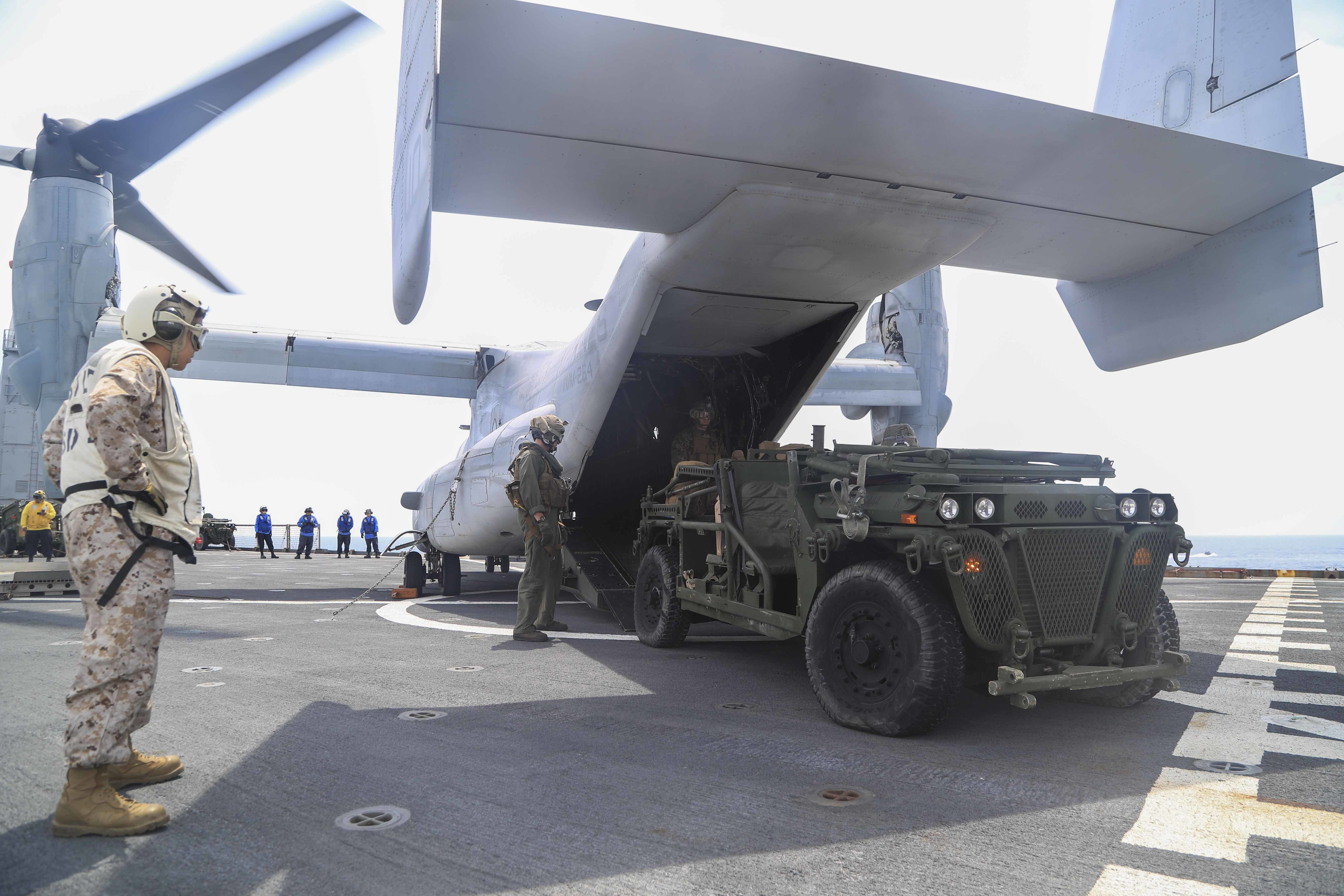
M1161 Growler prepared to board an MV-22 Osprey

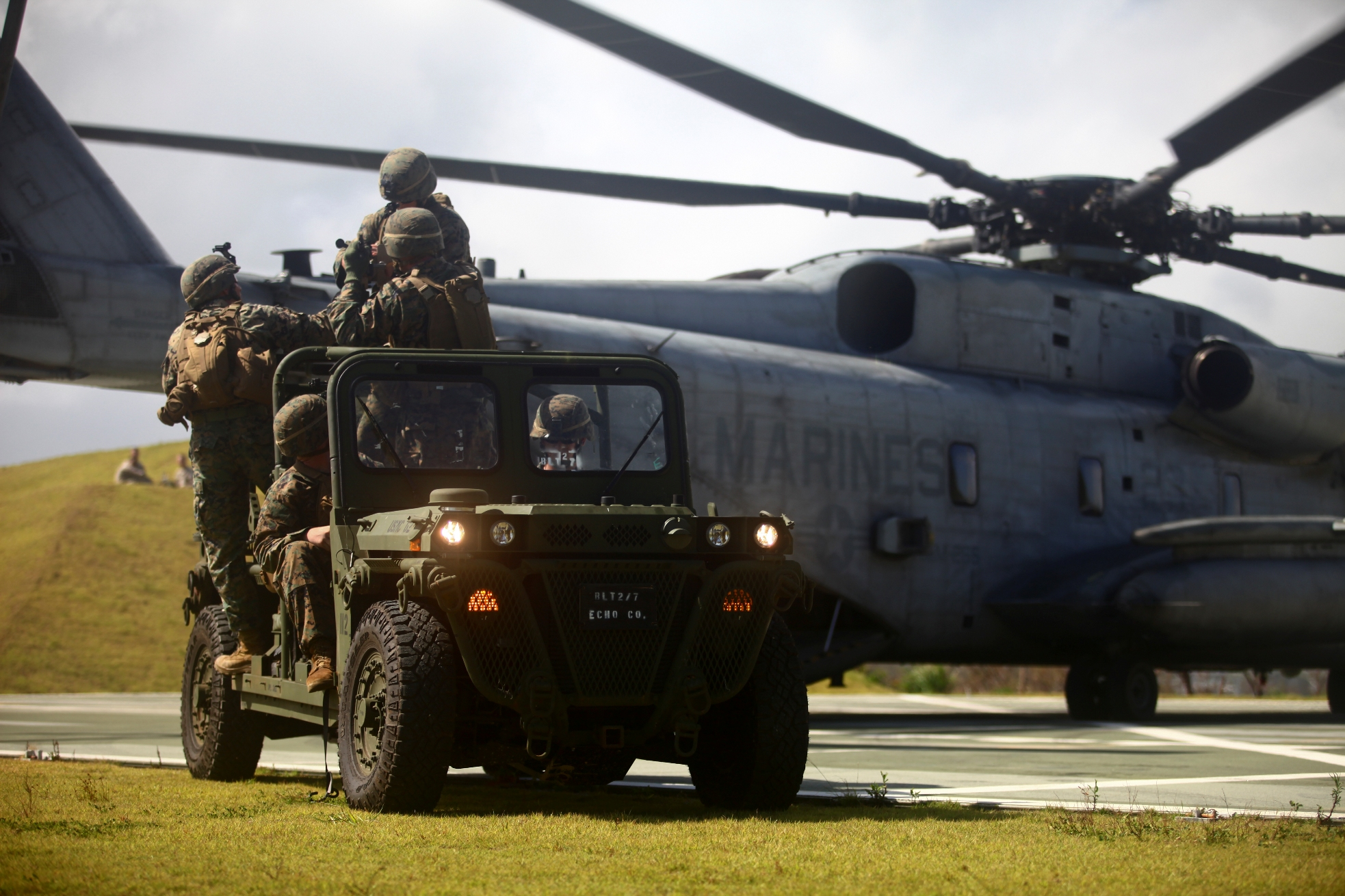

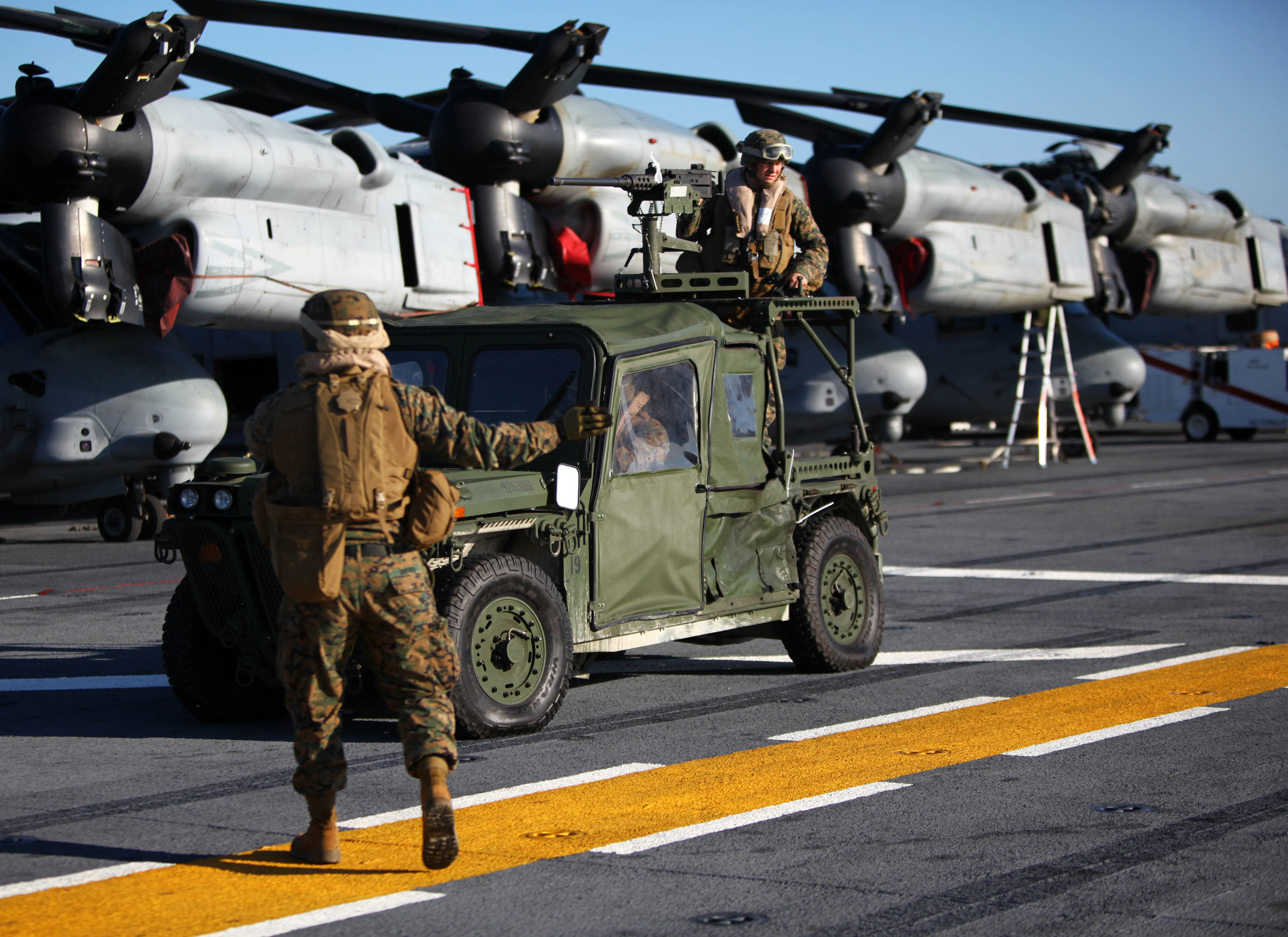

== Operators ==
=== Current operators ===
- USA United States Marine Corps: 600

Plus "approximately 1,000 vehicles to foreign militaries around the world."

== See also ==
- Desert Patrol Vehicles
- Interim Fast Attack Vehicle
- Spider LSV
- Phantom Badger (also certified for the V-22)
- SPECTRE light vehicle
- CS/VP-4
