= Overcoat (disambiguation) =

An overcoat is an article of clothing.

Overcoat or overcoats may also refer to:

- Overcoats (album), an album by John Hiatt
- Overcoats (duo), a musical duo
- Overcoat Recordings, a record label
- "The Overcoat", a short story by Nikolai Gogol

== See also ==
- The Overcoat (disambiguation)
