= Boeing Phantom Badger =

Phantom Badger
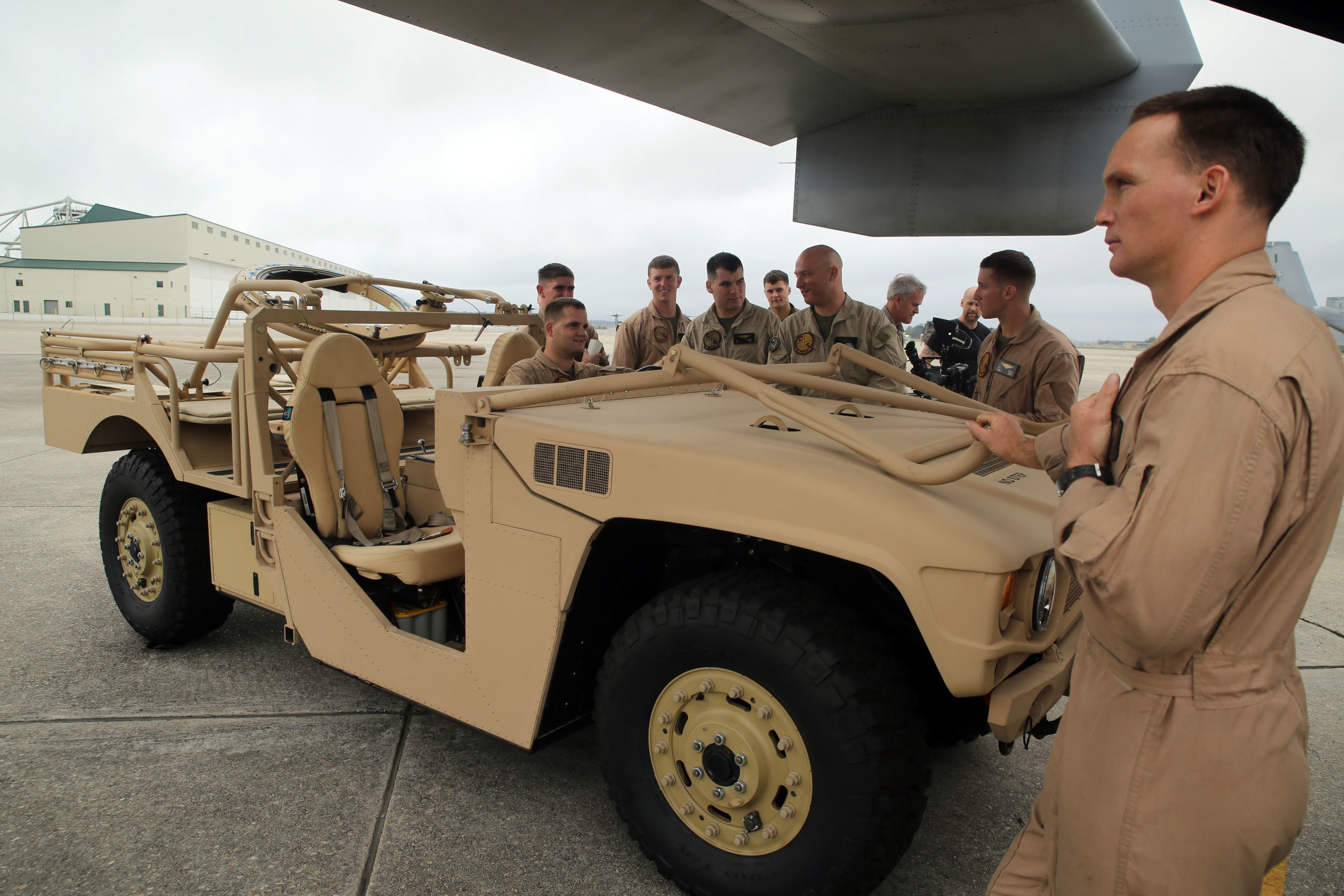
- Marines with the 22nd Operational Test and Evaluation Squadron look over the Phantom Badger
- Type: Light Utility Vehicle, 2-door truck
- Place of origin: United States

Service history
- In service: 2014–present
- Used by: United States

Production history
- Designer: MSI Defense
- Manufacturer: Boeing Phantom Works, assembled at Mooresville, North Carolina
- Produced: 2014–present
- Variants: Special Recon, Combat Search and Rescue, Casualty Transport, FAV

Specifications
- Mass: 7,850 lb (3,402 kg) base curb weight
- length: 180 in. (457 cm.)
- Width: 60 in. (152.5 cm)
- Height: 65 in. (165 cm), able to lower to 60 in. (152.5 cm) for transport
- Crew: 1 driver, passengers vary based on configuration
- Payload capacity: 3,356 lb (1,587 kg)
- Suspension: Independent 4×4
- Operational range: 450 miles (724 km)
- Maximum speed: 83 mph (134 kmph)
- Steering system: 24.5 ft (7.47 m) four-wheel steering; 32ft (9.75 m) two-wheel steering

The Boeing Phantom Badger, or simply the Badger, is a combat support vehicle built by Boeing, in collaboration with MSI Defense Solutions. Designed for transport inside the V-22 Osprey, the Badger is notable for its size and versatility. Unlike previous vehicles and competing offers, the Badger's design is such that it avoids non-standard equipment, instead using already available hardware for construction. Although officially certified for use with United States Navy aircraft, the Badger is also used by the United States Air Force as well as United States Marine Corps special operations.

The Badger is the second vehicle to fit into the MV-22 after the M1161 Growler ― the Internally Transportable Light Strike Vehicle (ITV-LSV) also designed specifically for use with the V-22 Osprey tiltrotor aircraft.

== Design ==
The Badger is designed with mission-specific rear modules that are attached with six bolts at six connection points that can be interchanged on the field in 30 minutes or less. Interchangeable modular mission capabilities include reconnaissance, combat search and rescue, casualty transport and explosive ordnance disposal in addition to mounts for weapons like a .50-caliber machine gun and 40mm automatic grenade launcher.
