= Interim Fast Attack Vehicle =

US reconnaissance vehicle

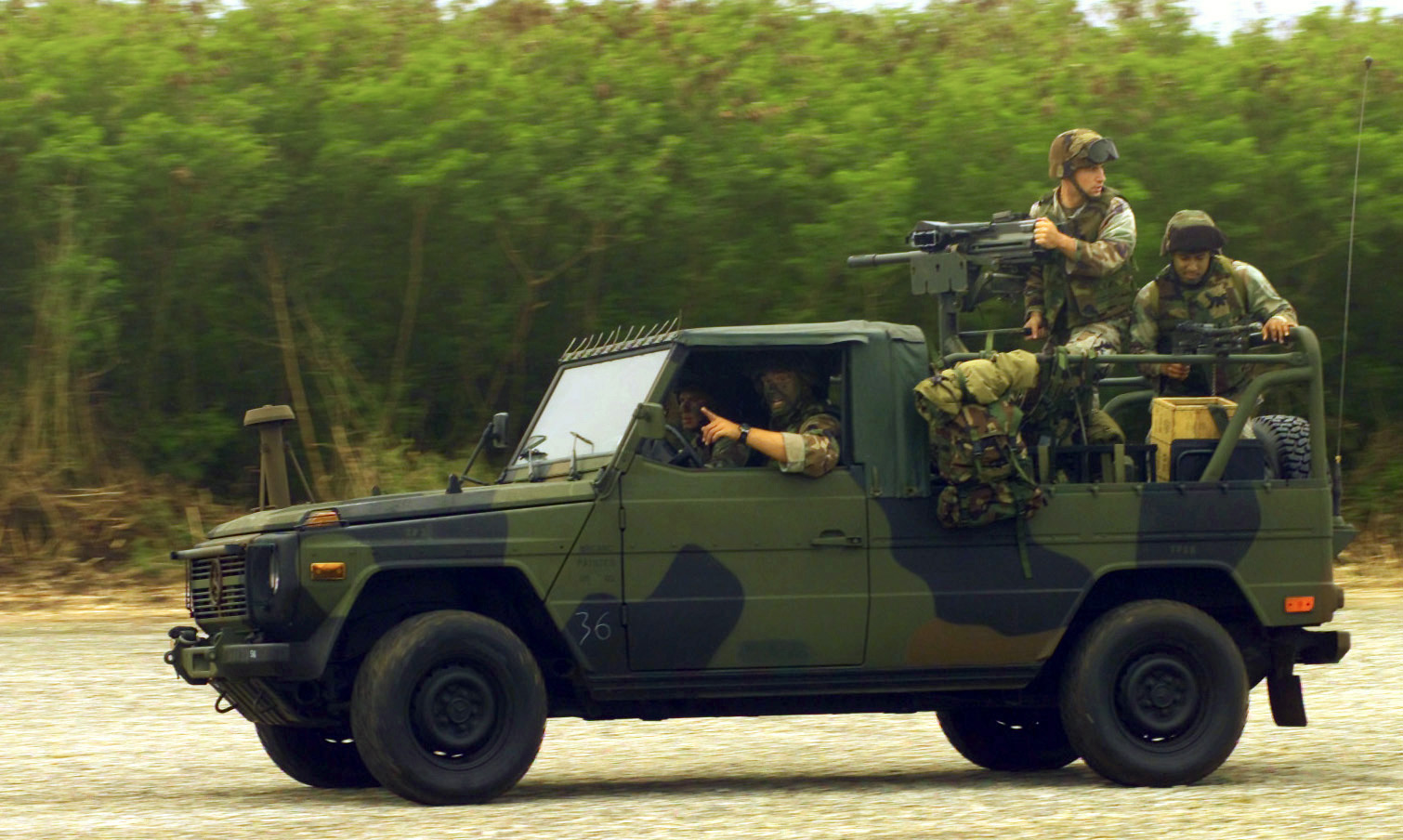
Marines race their Mercedes Interim Fast Attack Vehicle (IFAV) that is equipped with the Mk19 in support of Exercise Tandem Thrust 2003.

The Interim Fast Attack Vehicle (IFAV) is a reconnaissance vehicle deployed and used by the United States Marine Force Recon and Marine Expeditionary Units. Force Recon used to operate a fleet of Desert Patrol Vehicles (formerly known as Fast Attack Vehicles or FAVs for short), popularized by the Navy SEALs as the "black dune buggy." However, this vehicle lacked cargo capacity and firepower, so Force Recon moved to a militarized Mercedes-Benz G-Class, also known as a G-wagen, 290 GD Turbodiesel 4×4, a much more traditional "Jeep" type truck. The vehicle has only minimal armor, but numerous defensive weapons, including a Mk 19 automatic 40 mm grenade launcher. This vehicle is manufactured by Magna Steyr (Austria) for Mercedes-Benz (Germany).

One of the important abilities of this vehicle, was that it was possible transport by air on USMC aircraft such as the CH-46 Sea Knight, CH-53 Super Stallion, and V-22 Osprey.

The IFAV has since been replaced by the Internally Transportable Light Strike Vehicle (ITV-LSV).

== Overview ==
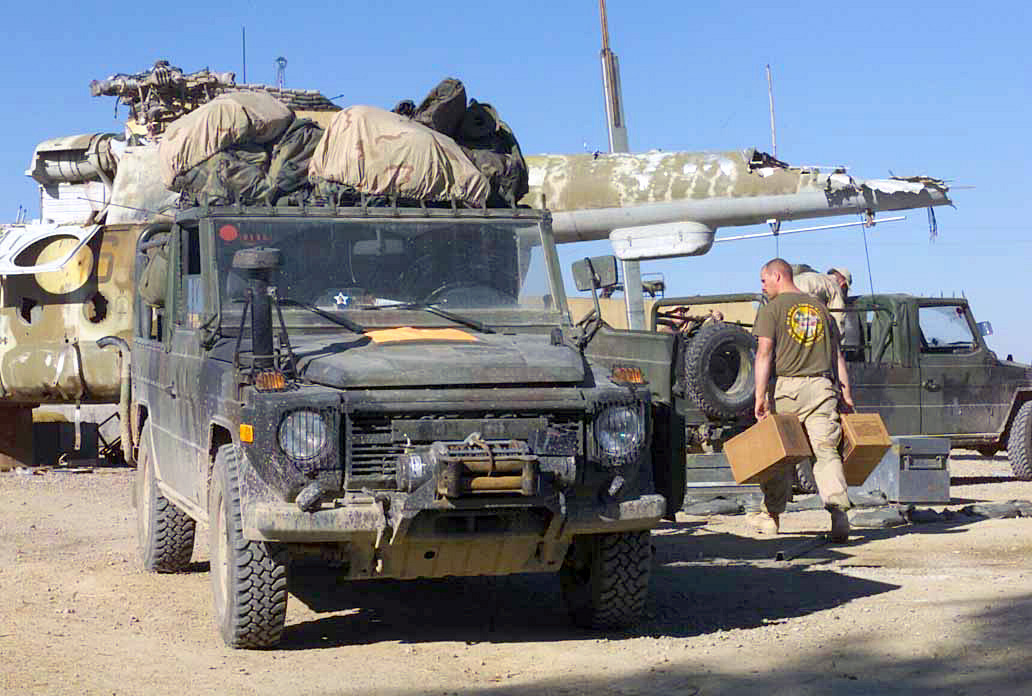
Marines load their Mercedes G IFAV (Interim Fast Attack Vehicle)

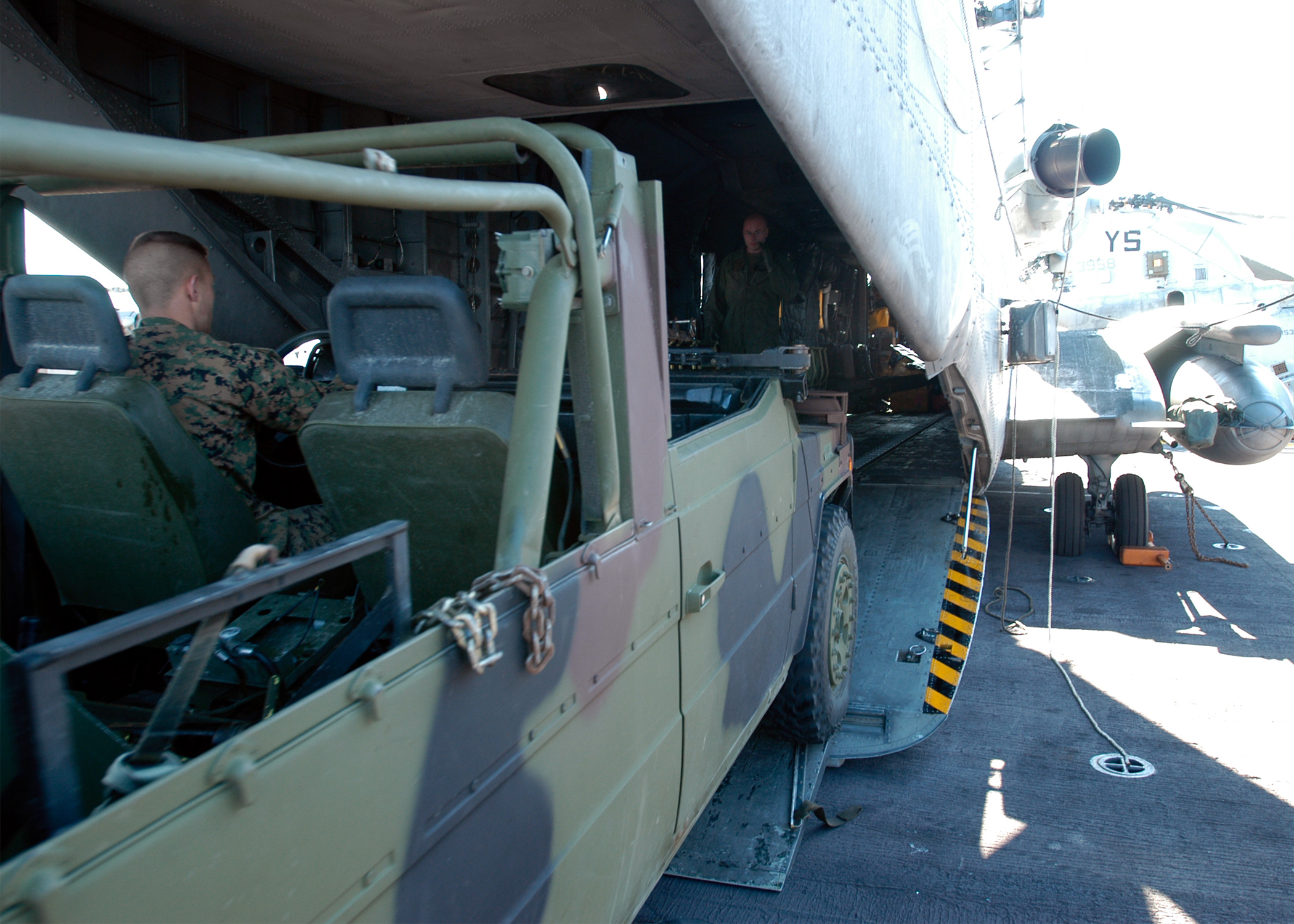
IFAV being loaded onto a CH-53E Super Stallion helicopter, 2005

The USMC Interim Fast Attack Vehicle (IFAV) is a modified version of the Mercedes-Benz Geländewagen 290. It replaces the modified M151A2 1/4 ton truck jeep used by the Marines as a FAV in the 1990s. The U.S. Marine Corps acquired 157 of the IFAVs distributed as follows:

- Marine Expeditionary Force (MEF) Camp Pendleton, CA (33)
- MEF Camp Lejeune, NC (25)
- MEF on Okinawa, Japan (27)
- 17th Force Recon, Afghanistan (22)
- 3rd Force Recon Bn, Iraq (23)
- 1st Provisional DMZ Police Company, Korea (15)
- various miscellaneous (12)

== See also ==
- Willys FAMAE Corvo – (Chile)
- Humvee – (United States)
- FN Herstal AS 24 – (Belgium)
- Desert Patrol Vehicle – (United States)
- FMC XR311 – (United States)
- Technical
- M151 – (United States)
- Ranger Special Operations Vehicle (RSOV) – (United Kingdom)
- Otokar Engerek
- Land Rover 1/2 ton Lightweight – (United Kingdom) designed for carry by Westland Wessex helicopter
