= Growler Manufacturing and Engineering =

American automotive manufacturer

- Industry: Automotive
- Founded: Ocala, Florida, United States (1999)
- Headquarters: United States
- Number of locations: 4
- Products: Automobiles
- Website: www.growlerme.com

Growler Manufacturing and Engineering, formerly American Growler, Inc., is an automotive manufacturing firm producing light tactical vehicles, originally based in Ocala, Florida, then in Robbins, North Carolina, and now in the HUBZone in Star, North Carolina. For over ten years, it has built a line of military light utility vehicles partly derived from drivetrains from M151 Jeeps. Versions range from $7,000 in price kit form, a $15,500 tactical dune buggy, and a $33,000 version sold to the Dominican Republic's military.

== History ==
Growler Manufacturing and Engineering started as Utility Vehicles Inc. in 1999 who designed new frames and bodies and remanufactured drive trains from military vehicles, primarily M151 jeeps, purchased through surplus sales. Through several acquisitions and renamings they ended up based in Star NC where Growler produces light tactical vehicle and equipment trailers for the United States Marine Corps.

== Light Strike Vehicle ==
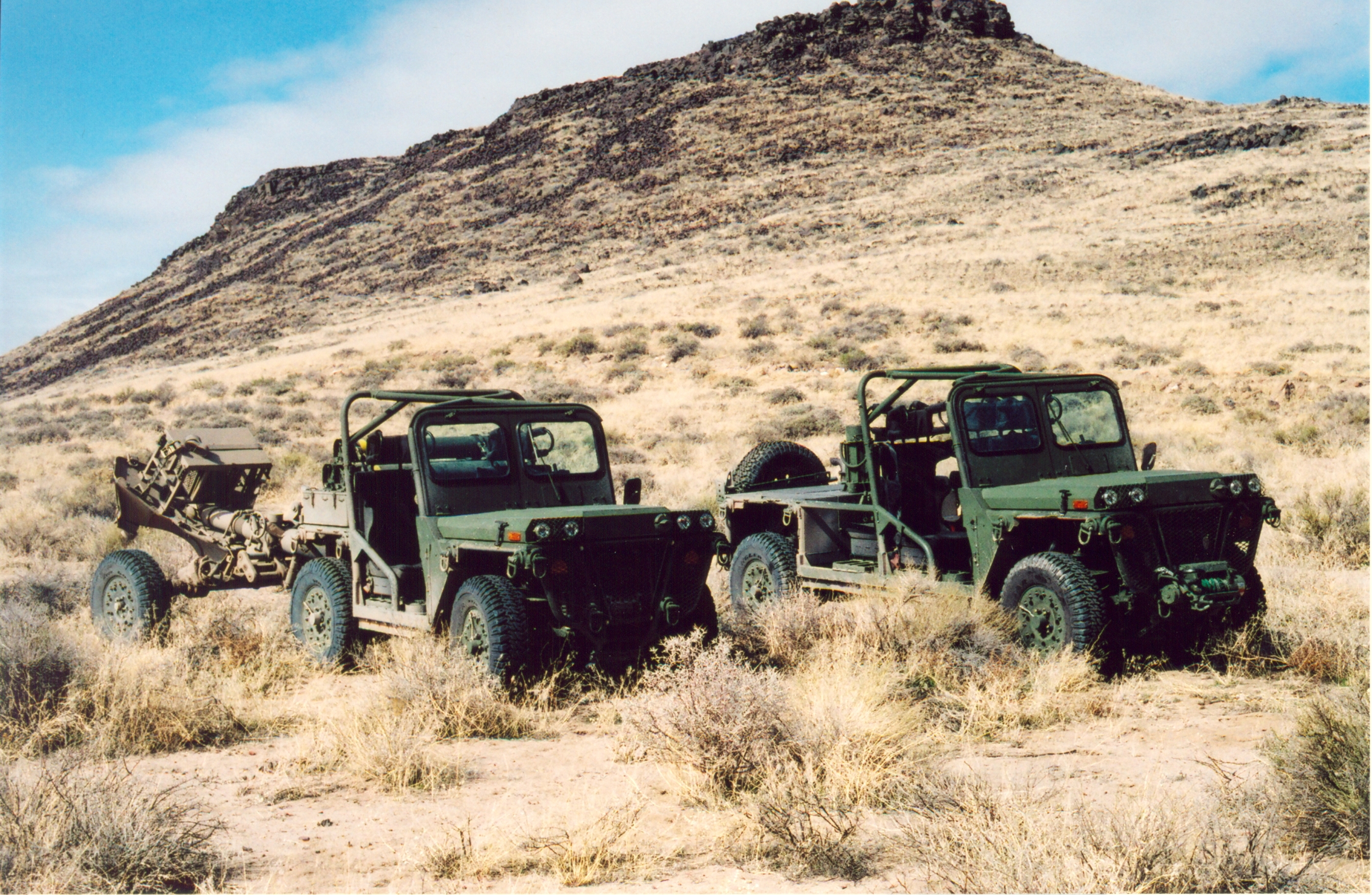
M1163 Prime Mover with towed M327 120mm mortar (left), and M1161 ITV-LSV Growler (right) variants.

Growler's most expensive model at over $200,000 each, is the Growler Light Strike vehicle. It was specially designed to be transported in the small cargo hold of the V-22 Osprey tilt-rotor aircraft along with the Expeditionary Fire Support System towed mortar.

The V-22 cargo compartment is five feet wide, five feet tall and less than 17 feet in length. In 2005, the Marines planned to buy 400 of the vehicles in a contract that combined with the mortar system was expected to total $296 million.

== Notes ==
https://www.youtube.com/c/rasmussenequipment
