= The Overcoat (disambiguation) =

The Overcoat is a story by Nikolai Gogol. It may also refer to the title of several films, some based on that story:

- The Overcoat (1916 film), an American film directed by Rae Berger
- The Overcoat (1926 film), a Soviet silent film directed by Grigori Kozintsev and Leonid Trauberg
- The Overcoat (1952 film), originally Il Cappotto, an Italian film directed by Alberto Lattuada
- The Overcoat (1959 film), a Soviet film directed by Aleksey Batalov
- The Overcoat (1997 film), a Greek film
- The Overcoat (2001 film), a Canadian television film produced by the CBC
- The Overcoat (animated film), an upcoming Russian animated feature film
