= Underseal =

Coating applied to the underbody of an automobile

Underseal (often called undercoating in the U.S.) is two different things: a protective coating applied to the underbody or chassis of an automobile, and a repair method for strengthening concrete slabs.

== On vehicles ==
Underseal is intended to protect against salt, moisture, and impact damage from gravel, which can chip ordinary paint, allowing rusting to begin. Underseal can also reduce road noise. Newer cars are typically manufactured with corrosion protection, making after-market undersealing unnecessary.

Historically, a bitumen-based compound was used, but after approximately a decade, such coatings become brittle, and water can become trapped between the underseal and body metal, counterproductively creating a more favourable environment for rust than if no underseal were applied at all. Wax-based underseals do not have this disadvantage, but can be eroded and eventually washed if a pressure washer is used to clean the vehicle's underbody. Rubber-based underseals are also sometimes used.

Vehicles for sale in some territories are not undersealed, because the climate is not sufficiently aggressive to warrant it. If such a vehicle is subsequently imported into a country with some combination of high rainfall, cold winters, and salting of roads to prevent ice, application of underseal is often used.

== On roads ==
When concrete on streets, parking lots, or warehouse floors begins to degrade, there are a few methods of repair available. Concrete undersealing is a process by which hot asphalt is pumped underneath the concrete slab so that it flows into hollow and eroded patches. After concrete undersealing, the concrete is more stable and can be overlaid with a thin layer of asphalt to repair cracks, saving the expense and time of replacing the entire surface.
