= FMC XR311 =

XR311
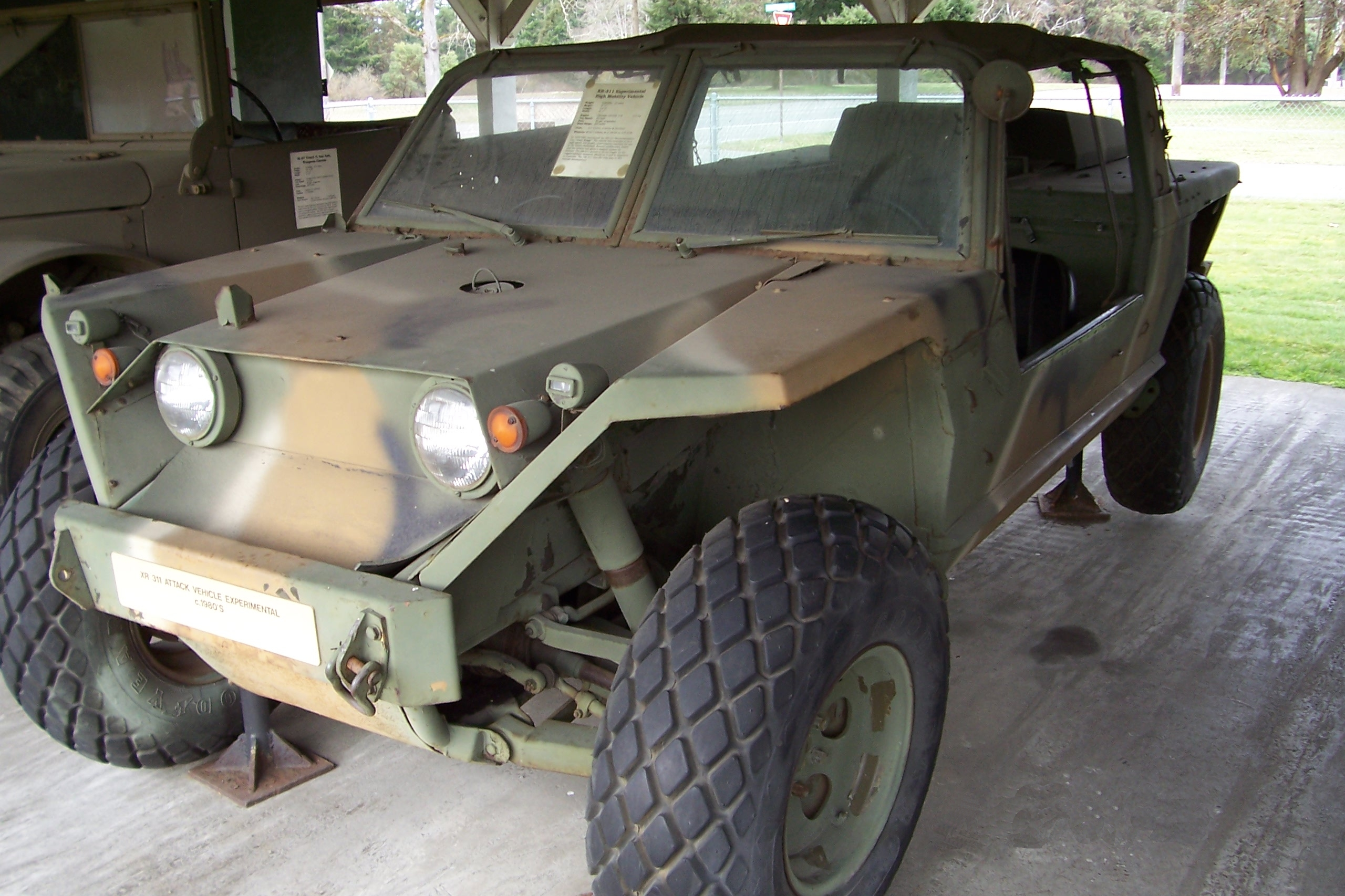
- An XR311 on display

Overview
- Manufacturer: FMC Corporation
- Production: Limited Production (at least one pre-production batch)

Body and chassis
- Class: Multipurpose Vehicle
- Related: Humvee

Powertrain
- Engine: rear-mounted 5.2L (318ci) LA V8, 190 hp@4,800rpm, 292lb-ft@2,200rpm (gross), or 5.9L (360ci) LA V8, optional 4-barrel carburetor or potential Deutz V8 turbodiesel
- Transmission: 3-speed Chrysler TorqueFlite A727 automatic Single-speed, full time transfer case, lockable center differential

Dimensions
- Wheelbase: 3,070 mm (121 in)
- Length: 4,340 mm (171 in)
- Width: 1,930 mm (76 in)
- Height: 1,600 mm (63 in)
- Curb weight: 4,400lbs

Chronology
- Successor: None

The XR311 was a prototype military vehicle of US origin that was procured in limited numbers during the 1970s. It was originally developed as the High Mobility Combat Vehicle, or HMCV (not to be confused with the JGSDF MCV, which was also called the "HMCV" for a short time).

== Development ==
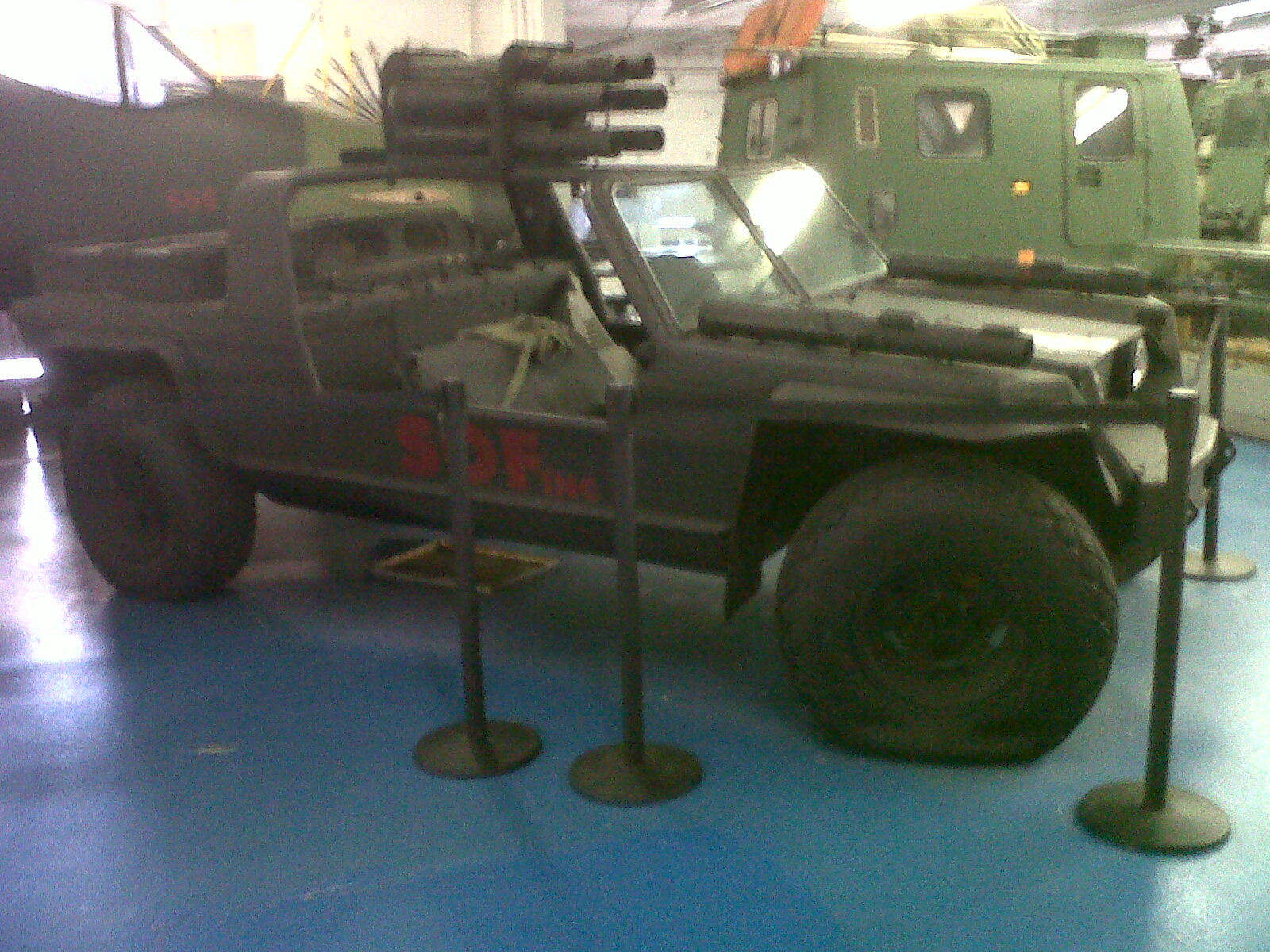
An XR311 with six-tube recoilless rifle cluster.

Development of the XR311 commenced as a private venture in 1969, with the first of two prototypes being completed in 1970. The vehicle was developed as a possible replacement for the by that time over ten years old M151 jeep, years prior to the Lamborghini Cheetah and other competitors, including AM General's design for the HMMWV, which was eventually selected. As a result of the trials of these two prototypes the US Army purchased ten improved or second generation models in 1971. Of these ten vehicles, four had a TOW missile installation for use in the anti-tank/AFV role, three had an M2HB machine-gun for use in the reconnaissance role and three had 7.62mm M60 machine guns and the crew armor kit for use in the escort/security role. These trials were completed in 1972. They were then tested by the 2nd Armored Division. In 1974 they were also tested in the 2nd Armored Reconnaissance Scout Vehicle competition along with a number of vehicles including the original FMC Technologies and Lockheed Martin designs. It has been stated that an XR311 with TOW missile installation cost around $50,000. The XR311 was designed to carry out a wide variety of roles including anti-tank, reconnaissance patrol, convoy escort, command and control, medivac, military police, mortar carrier, internal security and forward air defense communications vehicle.

== Variants ==
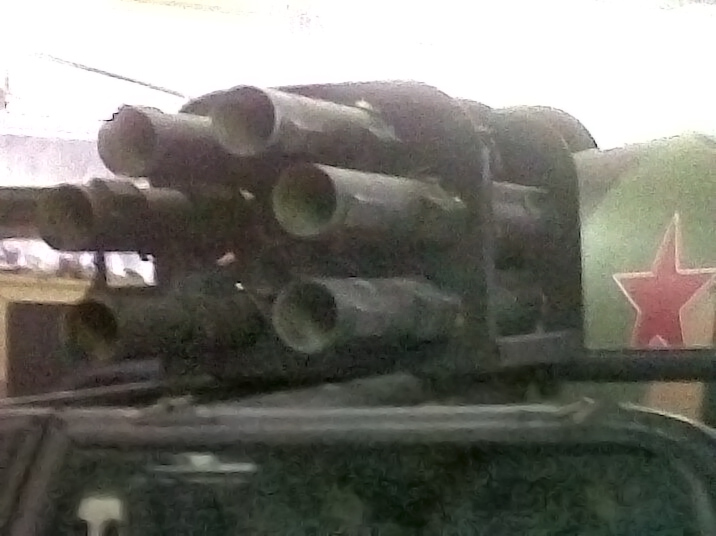
Detail of the six-tube recoilless rifle cluster

There were several models of the XR311:

- Support: A 106 mm Recoilless rifle mounted above the crew compartment, and a total of six rounds of ammunition,
- Anti-tank: TOW installation with a total of 10 TOW missiles
- Reconnaissance: Fitted with a ring-mounted .50cal M2HB machine gun with a 360-degree traverse
- Convoy Escort/ Security Vehicle: This could be provided with a pintle-mount 5.56mm or 7.62 mm GPMG's, XM174 automatic grenade launchers and various other similar weapons. These weapons could also be mounted on the reconnaissance model on the ring mount.

The following kits were available for the basic vehicle: crew compartment armor kit, consisting of a high-hardness steel doors, side body panels, toe panel, firewall, bulletproof windshield and bulletproof side windows, armored radiator, armored fuel tank, top and door kit (waterproof fabric with plastic windows and hinged doors) various communications installations, high output alternators (100 and 180 amp), litter-carrying kit, jump seat for two additional passengers, explosion-resistant reticulated foam fuel-tank filler, radial tires or foam-filled run-flat tires, extreme climate kits for winterization or desert temperatures, tool kit and portable fire extinguisher.

== Overview ==
The XR311 is built around a tubular-steel frame safety roll-cage which protects the passenger compartment if the vehicle rolls over. This cage is covered by a heavy-gauge sheet metal forming the skin of the vehicle. An internally mounted electrical extraction winch with a capacity of 5,000 kg (11,023 lb) can be mounted at the front of the vehicle if required, and the 2-piece windshield can be removed to provide greater visibility and protect from flying glass fragments. The glass halves are stored in a mounting bracket on the hood until needed again. The passenger compartment is in the center of the vehicle with the driver on the left and the passenger seat to the right. There is space for 0.93 cubic metres (33 cu ft) of cargo behind the passenger seats. The engine and transmission are at the rear of the hull and there is an external load-carrying platform above this which can take a maximum load of 386 kg (851 lb). The minimum ground clearance is 11 inches, and a full length skid pan protects the hull and drivetrain, which allows the vehicle to slide over obstacles. The transmission is a Chrysler A-727 "TorqueFlite" torque converter automatic, with three forward and one reverse gears. The XR311 is a full-time 4WD vehicle. "Trak-lok" limited-slip differentials with a 5.89:1 drive ratio are used front and rear, and a lockable center differential ensures traction to all wheels. The fully independent suspension uses modified Dana 44 centersections, and used many off the shelf parts from the front wheel drive Oldsmobile Toronado / Cadillac Eldorado (e.g., CV joints and boots, spindle and bearings, and 11-inch disk brakes), and is of a double-wishbone design with a torsion-bar spring and hydraulic telescopic shock absorber at each station. A stabilizer bar is provided for the rear suspension to limit body roll. Maximum speed is 80–90 mph for vehicles with the 318ci engine, dropping to 67 mph at full load. Acceleration was 12 seconds 0–60 mph time, falling to 10 seconds with the 360ci engine.

The steering is power-assisted and the tubeless tires feature a special high-pressure inner tire tube, which provides a built-in backup in case air pressure is lost from the main tire itself, as well as providing lateral support to eliminate leakage from the tire bead during high speed cornering. The tires are self-cleaning, meaning mud and other materials are flung free from the tread grooves by centrifugal force, rather than sticking to the tire (more commonly known as a "mud tire"). Disc brakes are fitted on all four wheels. The electrical system is 24V DC, and two batteries with a capacity of 45 Amp/Hr are provided. The alternator is of the integral rectifier and regulator type. The XR311 is provided with a heavy duty towing pintle as well as a trailer wiring harness receptacle. It is air-transportable and can be air-dropped.

== See also ==
- Lamborghini Cheetah – (Italy)
- Interim Fast Attack Vehicle – (United States)
