= Lynx (ATV) =

Lightweight all-terrain vehicle

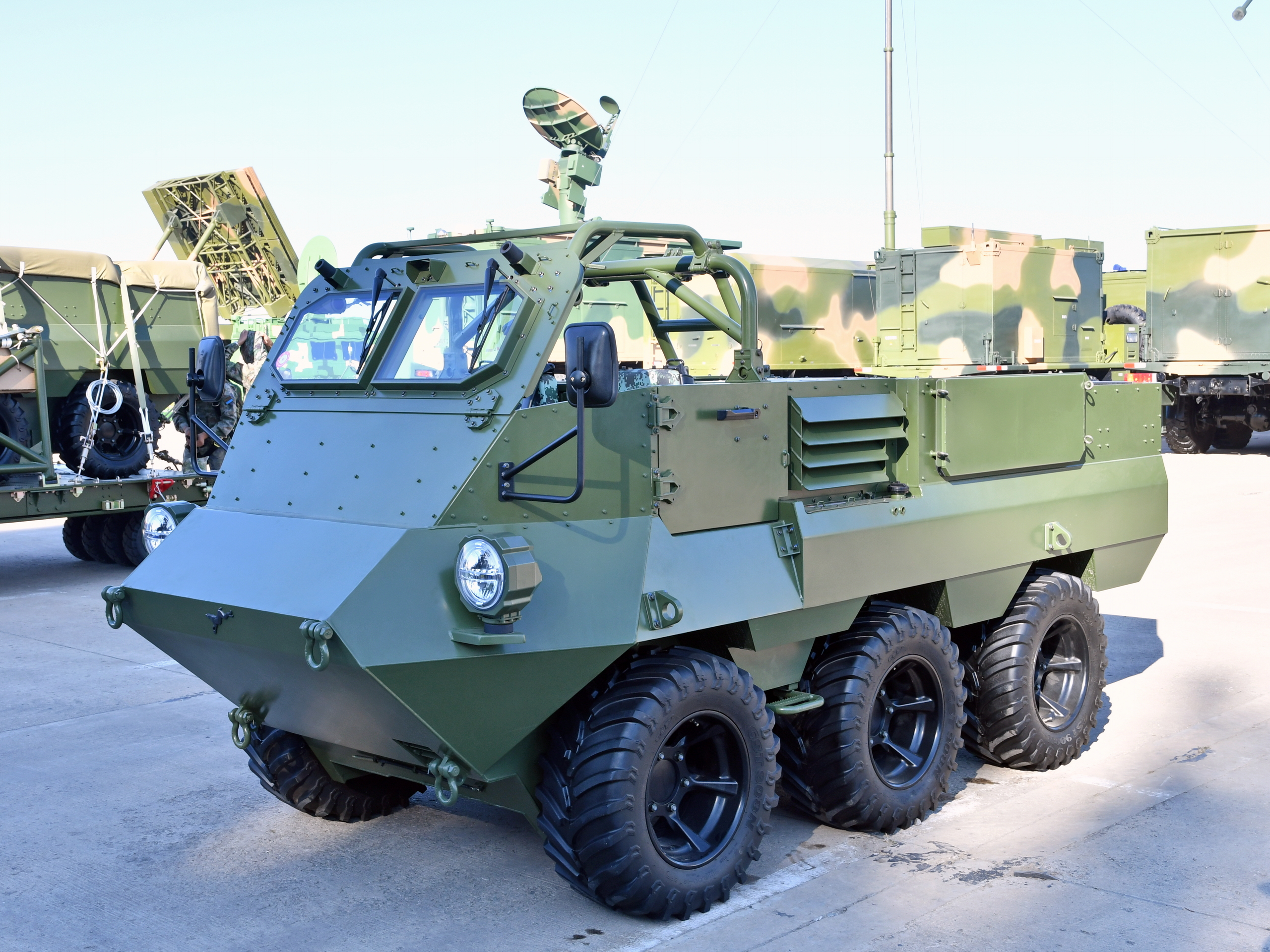
Lynx CS/VP16 in PLA Air Force service

Lynx (Chinese: 山猫; pinyin: Shān māo) is a series of lightweight all-terrain vehicle with 8x8, 6x6, or 4x4 all wheel drive. The vehicle is amphibious and capable of center-turning. Militarized version were observed in 2008 with reinforced chassis, weapon mounts, storage space and roll cage. The vehicle has different layout for different mission set, including troop transport, logistics, heavy weapon platform, reconnaissance, air defense, engineering service, or medical evacuation. During airborne, quick reaction and special forces operations this vehicle can be launched by tactical airlift or transport helicopters, or helicopter sling load.

== Design ==
=== Lynx CS/VP4 ===
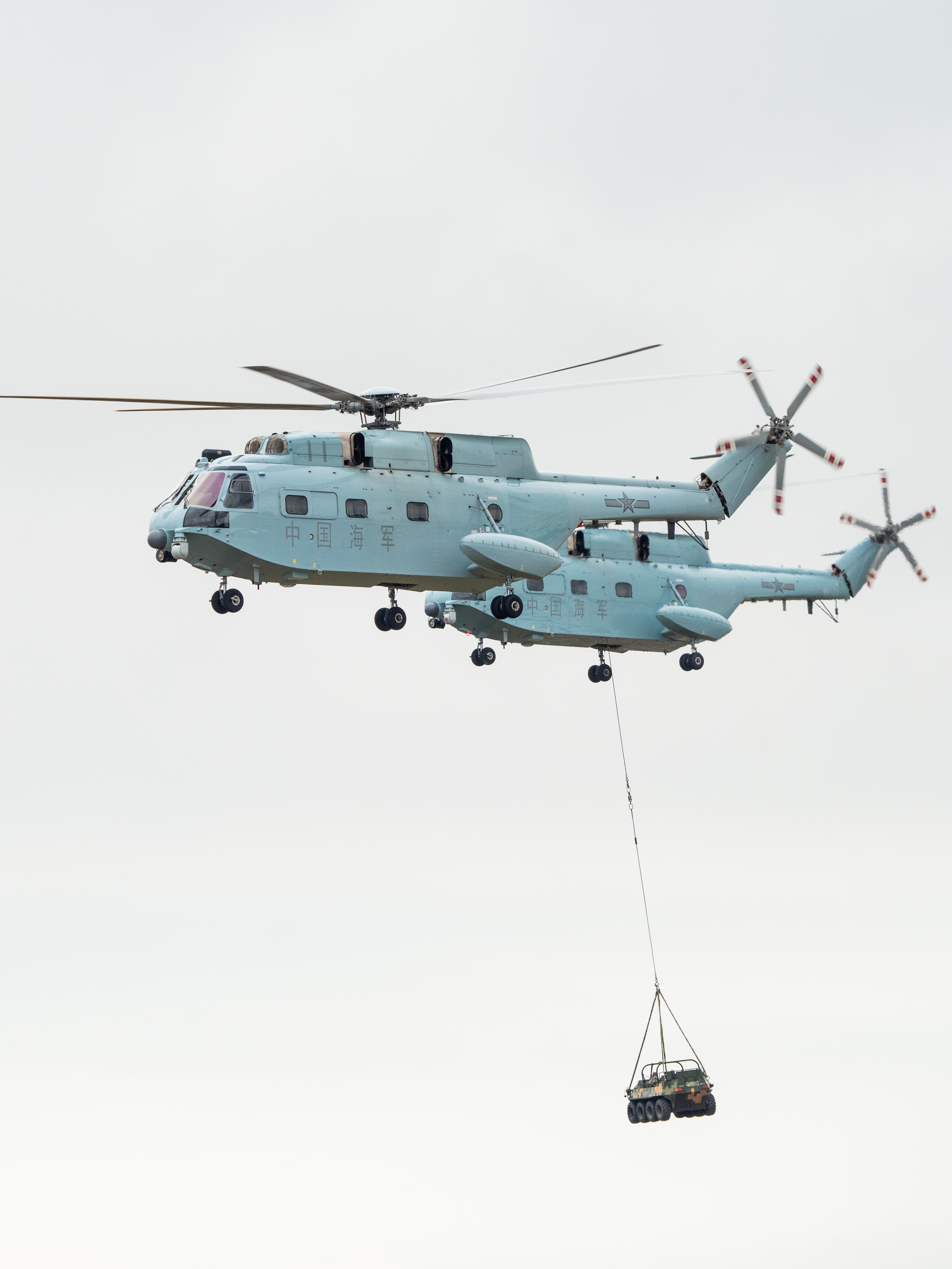
PLA Navy Z-18 underslung CS/VP4 ATV

The vehicle features cargo space at the rear, and it can carry troops, equipment, or ammunition. Lynx has a payload capacity of 1,100 kg and is capable of neutral steering. Troop transport configuration has seatings for the driver with five passengers. The All-terrain vehicle can tow light artillery pieces or equipment. Heavy machine gun, multiple rocket launchers, grenade launchers, missiles, and rockets can be mounted on the car. Some version is observed with 100 mm and 120 mm artillery guns. The first generation chassis was observed in use by the People's Liberation Army Ground Force (PLAGF) in 2008.

The second generation chassis was unveiled at Airshow China in 2016. The second-gen car features a frontal engine department, opening more space in the back for mounted weapons.

Dimensions and weight

- Crew: 2 (driver and weapon station operator)
- Passengers: 4-8 (depending on the variant)
- Length: 3,900 mm (153.5 in)
- Width: 1,800 mm (70.9 in)
- Maximum speed: 120 km/h (75 mph) (emergency)
- Maximum speed: 80 km/h (50 mph) (normal operation)
- Engine: 1.4T Diesel
- Transmission: Manual or Automatic
- Suspension: Independent
- Steering: Differential steering

=== Lynx CS/VP11 ===
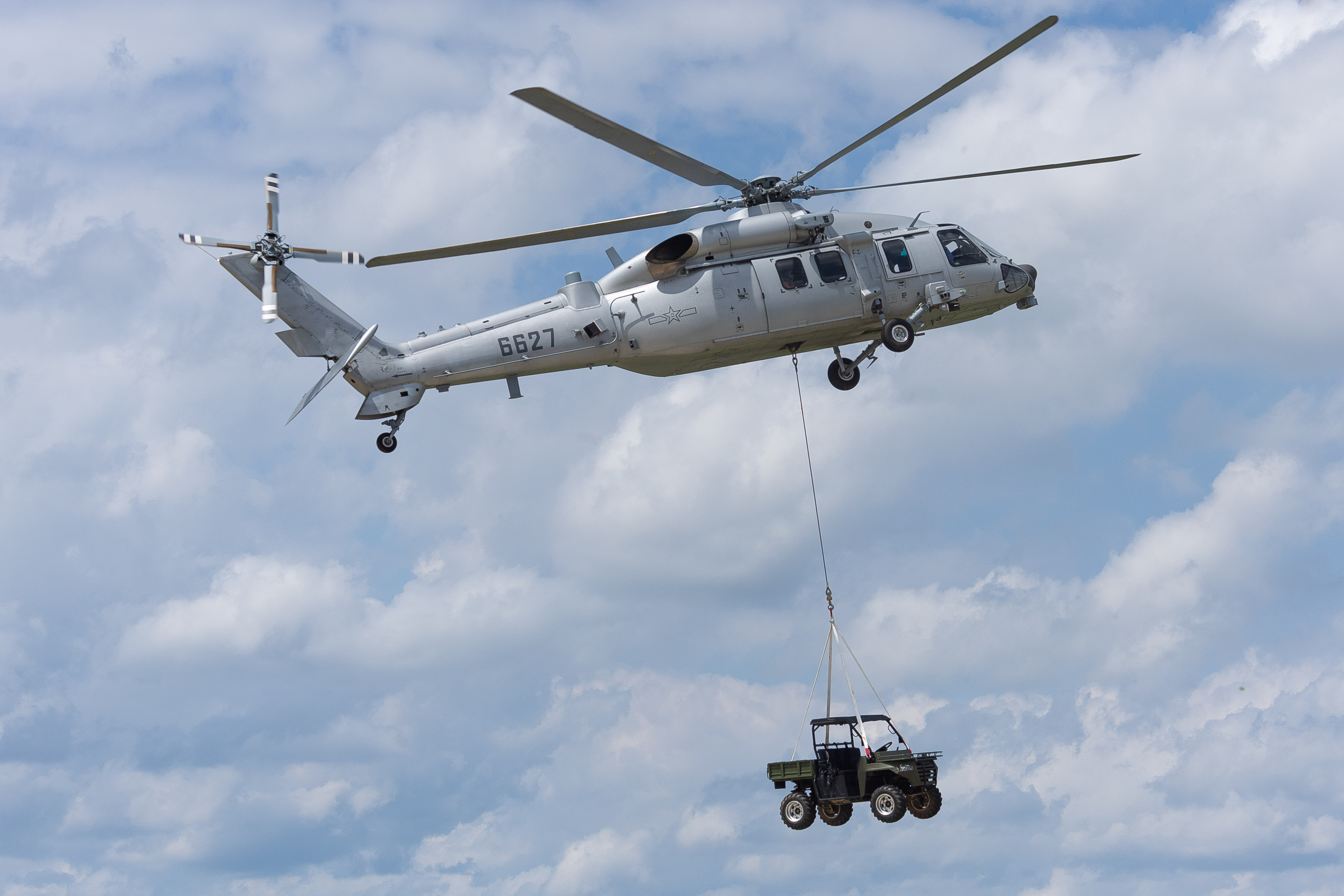
PLAAF Z-20K sling loading Lynx CS/VP11 at Changchun Airshow 2023

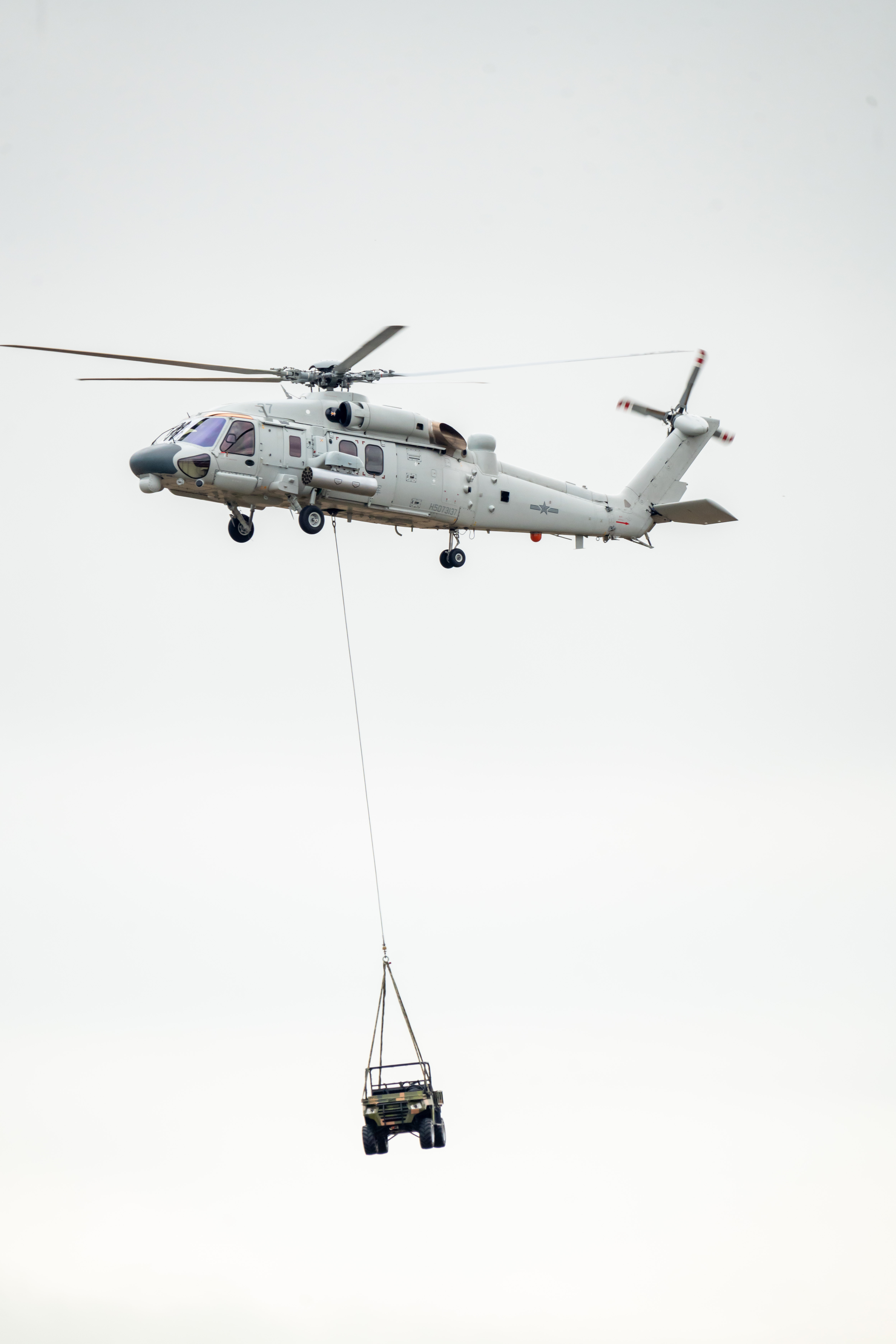
PLA Navy Z-20J sling loading a Luyx CS/VP11

A 4x4 assault vehicle variant with independent suspension unit is fitted with mission equipment for transportation, logistics, and medical evacuation. The 4x4 variant can be carried internally by a medium-lift helicopter and weighs 1.2 tons. The medical variant can accommodate two medical personnel (including the driver) and carry up to three wounded soldiers by built-in stretchers. CS/VP11 can work as an unmanned ground vehicle (UGV), controlled remotely without the driver on board.

=== Lynx CS/VP15 ===
CS/VP15 is the quad bike variant of the Lynx ATV family.

=== Lynx CS/VP16 ===
Lynx CS/VP16 is a 6x6 all-terrain amphibious vehicle with unmanned ground vehicle (UGV) capability. CS/VP16 is the third generation Lynx ATV derived from the second generation CS/VP4 chassis. CS/VP16 features a lightweight multi-purpose chassis that is partly influenced by the previous Lynx project, with new features including a new hybrid engine of 100 hp, new independent wheel suspension units, and a remote control weapon station. Various weapon modules can be mounted in the aft section of the vehicle, including a plate-protected personnel carrier, self-propelled howitzer, self-propelled 82 mm gun-mortar, 120 mm mortar carrier, multiple launch rocket system, 23mm revolver gun-missile system, and 40-mm autocannon. The driver is situated on the front left in front of the engine compartment, while the co-driver/weapon operator is located to the right of the driver. The weapon module can be controlled from the co-driver's seat or remotely from a distance. The whole vehicle can be controlled remotely via unmanned operation mode.

At International Defence Exhibition (IDEX) 2025, the CS/VP16B was showcased by the Chinese military industry. CS/VP16B features autonomous control functions and hybrid propulsion. The hybrid powertrain allows a maximum range of 200 km (120 mi) with a purely electric range of 20 km (12 mi). Multiple sensors are fitted to support the self-driving function, with a maximum speed of 50 km/h (31 mph).

=== Lynx CS/VP17 ===
Lynx CS/VP17 is an 8x8 all-terrain amphibious vehicle with swingarm independent suspension. The wheels can be turned into tracks with field modifications.

== Operators ==
- China
  - People's Liberation Army Ground Force
  - People's Liberation Army Special Operations Forces
  - People's Liberation Army Navy Marine Corps
  - People's Liberation Army Air Force Airborne Corps.
- Venezuela
- Cambodia
- Mali: CS/VP11 Lynx
