= Desert Patrol Vehicle =

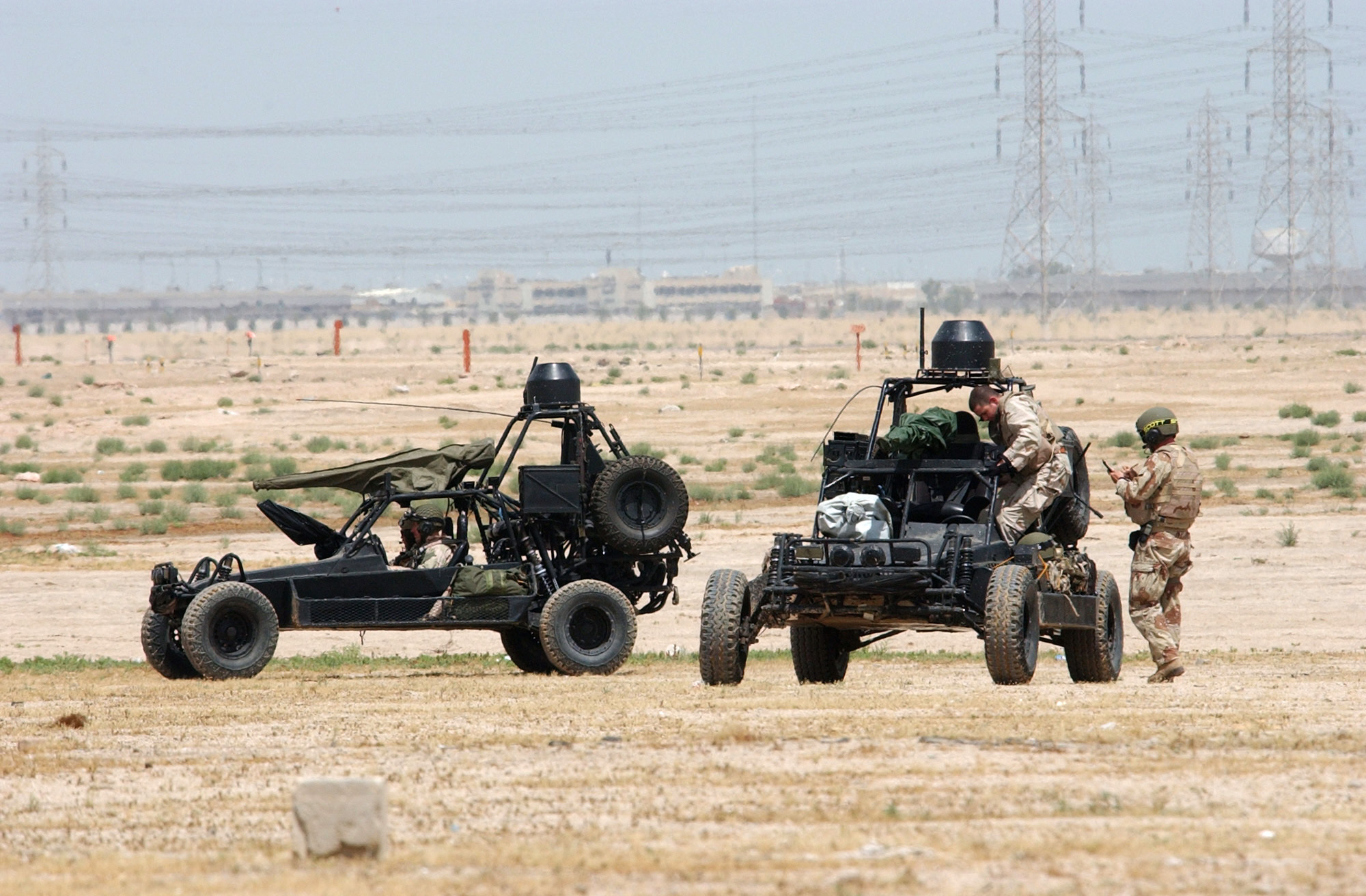
- United States Navy SEALs operate Desert Patrol Vehicles (DPV) while preparing for an upcoming mission. U.S. Navy photo.
- Type: Light attack vehicle, sandrail
- Place of origin: United States

Service history
- In service: 1991 – present
- Used by: United States México
- Wars: Gulf War; Iraq War

Production history
- Manufacturer: Chenowth Racing Products, Inc.
- Produced: 1991 – present

Specifications
- Engine: 2.0 liters (120 cubic inches) air-cooled 200 horsepower (150 kW)
- Payload capacity: 1,500 pounds (680 kg)
- Operational range: 200 miles (320 km)
- Maximum speed: 80 miles per hour (130 km/h)

The Desert Patrol Vehicle (DPV), formerly called the Fast Attack Vehicle (FAV), is a Chenowth high-speed, lightly armored sandrail-like vehicle first used in combat during the Gulf War in 1991. Due to their dash speed and off-road mobility, the DPVs were used extensively during Operation Desert Storm. The first U.S. forces to enter Kuwait City were United States Navy SEALs in DPVs.

== Performance ==
The DPV was built by Chenowth Racing Products, Inc. The German Volkswagen Kübelwagen was the first military Light Utility Vehicle based on the Volkswagen Beetle which uses rear-wheel rather than four-wheel drive. Volkswagen components were also the basis for the postwar dune buggy, and its layout is used in the DPV with rear-mounted air-cooled 200 hp (150 kW) Volkswagen engine. This makes the lightweight vehicle capable of accelerating from 0 to 30 mph (0 to 48 km/h) in four seconds and able to travel at speeds of up to 80 mph (130 km/h). With its standard 21 gallon (79.5 litre) fuel tank, the DPV has a range of about 210 miles (340 km). An optional fuel bladder can extend the range to over 1,000 miles (1,600 km). Payload capacity is 1,500 pounds (680 kg).

== History ==
The DPV is a variant of the Fast Attack Vehicle, which was developed during the 1980s as part of the United States Army's High Technology Light Division (9th Infantry Division). The HTLD was given carte blanche to develop doctrine, decide force structure, and design equipment by then Army Chief of Staff Edward C. Meyer. One of the pieces of equipment created was the Fast Attack Vehicle. Chenowth delivered 120 FAVs to the Army in 1982. HTTB (High Technology Test Bed) in the units in the 9th Infantry were first to deploy these vehicles. Along with light off-road motorcycles, the FAV was intended to provide a highly mobile component to the mostly foot infantry unit.

Eventually, the FAVs were replaced by Humvees in general military use, which did not provide nearly the speed nor extreme off-road capabilities of the FAVs. FAVs were transferred to special forces use where it has been largely replaced by the Light Strike Vehicle.

== Armament ==
The original tests used commercial dune buggies modified to carry weapons such as TOW missiles and recoilless rifles. However, the recoilless rifles still had enough recoil to flip the lightweight dune buggies and were abandoned. The TOW missiles had much greater success, but they violated existing Army TOW doctrine. The Army had determined that a TOW needed a 3-man team to operate it. The DPVs could only carry a two-man crew and they seemed perfectly capable of operating the TOW, but this would have meant revising Army doctrine and possibly changing TOW deployment throughout the Army. Fort Benning decided to offer a "superior" DPV design that allowed a third crewman. This design was rejected by the HTLD team and was never produced.

The basic weapons on a DPV consist of a heavy 12.7 mm caliber M2 Browning machine gun, two lighter 7.62×51mm M60 machine guns, and two M136 AT4 anti-armor weapons. In some cases, the driver's M60 or the gunner's M2 is replaced with a 40 mm Mk 19 grenade launcher. Other light machine guns such as the M240 machine gun or 5.56×45mm M249 SAW can also be mounted.

== Similar US equipment ==
The United States Marines Corps also fielded a Fast Attack Vehicle – a completely different piece of equipment based on the M151 1/4-ton. This FAV stayed in use long after the fielding of the HMMWV because it could fit on Marine Corps helicopters while the wider HMMWV could not. In 1999, this FAV began to be replaced with the Interim Fast Attack Vehicle (IFAV) a version of the Mercedes-Benz MB 290 GD 1.5 ton truck.

== See also ==
- Kojak (vehicle) – (Bolivia)
- Light Strike Vehicle – (United States)
- Chenowth Advanced Light Strike Vehicle – (United States)
- Long Range Desert Group
- ULTRA AP – (United States)
- Willys FAMAE Corvo – (Chile)
- VLEGA Gaucho/Chivunk – (Brazil)
- Fabrique Nationale AS 24 – (Belgium)
- Light Strike Vehicle – (Singapore)
- Saker LSV – (United Kingdom)
