= LSV =

LSV may refer to:

== Organisations ==
- LSV Asset Management, an American quantitative investment management firm
- LSV (society), University of Missouri
- League of Social Democrats of Vojvodina (Liga socijaldemokrata Vojvodine), a political party in Serbia

== Transport ==
- Low-speed vehicle
- Light Strike Vehicle, a US military vehicle
- Mahindra Armored Light Specialist Vehicle, an Indian 4x4 military vehicle
- Limited Systems Vehicle, a class of fictional artificially intelligent starship in The Culture universe of late Scottish author Iain Banks
- Saker LSV, a British military vehicle
- A US Navy hull classification symbol: Vehicle landing ship (LSV)
- Logistics Support Vessel, U.S. Army watercraft class
- Nellis Air Force Base (IATA: LSV)

== Other ==
- Luis Scott-Vargas, a professional Magic: The Gathering player
- Literal Standard Version, a 2020 Bible translation
- Venezuelan Sign Language (Spanish: Lengua de señas venezolana)
