= Light Strike Vehicle (Singapore) =

Singaporean light attack vehicle

The Light Strike Vehicle (LSV) is a light fast attack vehicle used by the Singapore Army. In 2013, the Singapore-designed and -made Light Strike Vehicle Mark II (LSV MK.II) entered service to replace the ageing Singapore and Australian-made Light Strike Vehicle in service since 1998.

== Light Strike Vehicle ==
Light Strike Vehicle
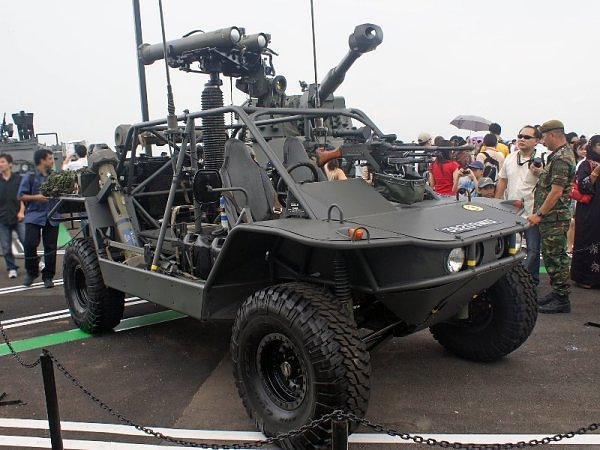
- LSV at the Singapore Airshow 2008 on display
- Type: Light Strike Vehicle
- Place of origin: Singapore; Australia

Service history
- In service: 1998–2013

Production history
- Manufacturer: ST Kinetics; Australian Defence Industries
- No. built: 84

Specifications
- Mass: Curb weight: 1,500 kg (3,306.9 lb)
- Length: Overall: 4,250 mm (13 ft 11.3 in)
- Width: Overall: 2,110 mm (6 ft 11.1 in)
- Height: Top of roll cage: 1,900 mm (6 ft 2.8 in)
- Crew: 3
- Main armament: 1× STK 40 Automatic grenade launcher or Spike anti-tank missiles
- Secondary armament: 1–2× FN MAG
- Engine: 2-litre turbocharged intercooled diesel 104 hp (78 kW)
- Payload capacity: 1,000 kg (2,204.6 lb)
- Transmission: Semi-automatic transaxle, 3 forward and 1 reverse gears
- Suspension: Independent all-round
- Operational range: 350 km (220 mi)
- Maximum speed: 110 km/h (68 mph)

The Light Strike Vehicle (LSV) was a US-designed vehicle named the Flyer designated R-12D produced in Australia and later in Singapore.

=== Design ===
The Flyer R-12 high-speed mobility vehicle was originally designed by HSMV Corporation, subsequently purchased by the Flyer Group (now Flyer Defense, a Division of Marvin Group). The Flyer was based on the chassis of the R-1 Rescue All Terrain Transport (RATT). The vehicle is powered by a rear-mounted, two-litre, 110 HP water-cooled turbocharged diesel coupled to a three-speed semi-automatic transmission. The chassis is constructed of welded chrome-moly seamless tubing and a long travel progressive suspension.

In 1995, the Flyer R-12D Light Strike Vehicle was a proposal for the cancelled Australian Army project “Mulgara” by Australian Defence Industries (ADI)/ Raceco-HSMV (US).

Later, Flyer Defense LLC designed an upgraded Flyer designated the R-12D Flyer 1 which was produced in the US for the Greek Army special forces in left-hand drive.

A second generation Flyer designated the Flyer 21 was developed by Flyer Defense LLC (also referred to as the Flyer Internally Transportable Vehicle [ITV-1]). The ITV-1 did not enter full production.

In 2003, ST Kinetics provided the United Arab Emirates (UAE) with prototype Flyers for a potential contract of between 60 and 90 light strike vehicles.

At the Eurosatory 2004 held in Paris, the Israeli company Rafael Armament Development Authority unveiled the Mantis high-mobility attack vehicle prototype based on the US-produced Flyer ITV-1. The Mantis did not enter full production; however, several prototype Mantis Flyers were successfully deployed in counter smuggling operations along the Israel–Egypt border and tested by special forces.

In 2004, the Malaysia government military company DEFTECH formed a partnership with Flyer Defense LLC to market the Flyer Advance Light Strike Vehicle (ALSV) GEN II (variant ITV-1) in the region, after ST Kinetics had commenced developing their own vehicle, the partnership continues today.

In 2008, the Indian government military company Ordnance Factory Board (OFB) produced a Flyer ITV-1 prototype with Flyer Defense LLC for the Indian Army Light Support Vehicle (LSV) contract. The vehicle did not enter production.

=== Production ===
In May 1996, Singapore placed an order with HSMV Corporation for 29 Flyer vehicles to be produced under licence in Australia by Australian Defence Industries (ADI)—an Australian government company—which were delivered in April 1998. The Flyer replaced Singapore Army jeeps armed with 106 mm recoilless guns.

Indonesia placed a large order for Flyer vehicles; however, only five Australian-produced vehicles were delivered.

In March 1998, Singapore placed a second order with HSMV Corporation for 50 Flyer vehicles to be produced under licence by ADI. In October 1998, ST Kinetics was granted a licence to produce the Flyer for HSMV Corporation and commenced production. The production of Flyer vehicles by ADI ceased. The second order started delivery in May 2000.

=== Armament ===
A typical weapon installation could be a 7.62 mm machine gun forward plus a pedestal mount for a missile launcher or a 40 mm automatic grenade launcher such as the 40AGL. The STK 50 heavy machine gun can also be mounted. Some vehicles in service with the Singapore Army carry a rear-mounted pedestal for two Spike anti-tank guided weapons (ATGW), with stowage for five missiles. Others have been seen with a combined 40 mm AGL and 7.62 mm machine gun mounting supplemented by a pintle-mounted 7.62 mm machine gun, while others have been seen mounting the MILAN ATGW.

=== Operators ===
- Indonesia: Kopassus purchased five Australian-produced vehicles
- Singapore: Guards formation of the Singapore Army initially purchased 29 Australian-produced vehicles received in 1998 followed by 50 Singapore-produced vehicles received in May 2000.

==== R-12D Flyer 1 ====
- Greece: Hellenic Army special forces purchased three vehicles received in February 2003.

==== ITV-1 ====
- Israel: Israel Defense Forces used prototype RAFAEL Mantis on Israel-Egypt border operations.

==== Unknown variant ====
- United States: US Special Forces reportedly used the Flyer, unknown numbers and unknown variant either R-12D Flyer 1 or Flyer 21 / ITV-1.

== Light Strike Vehicle Mark II ==
Light Strike Vehicle Mark II
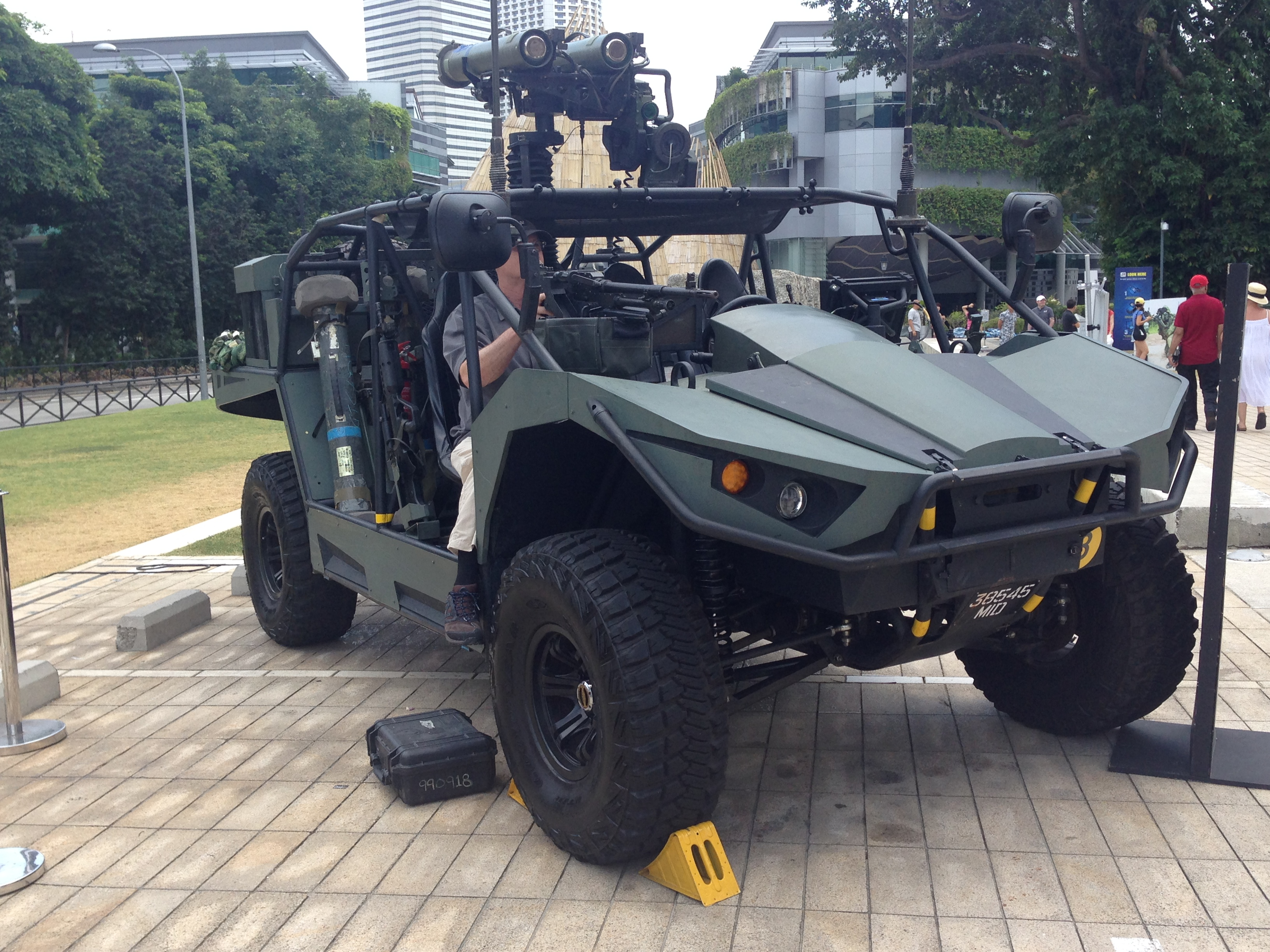
- LSV Mark II on display at the National Museum of Singapore
- Type: Light Strike Vehicle
- Place of origin: Singapore

Service history
- In service: 2013–present
- Used by: Singapore Army

Production history
- Manufacturer: ST Kinetics

Specifications
- Mass: Curb weight: 1,800 kg (3,968.3 lb)
- Length: Overall: 4,900 mm (16 ft 0.9 in)
- Width: Overall: 2,100 mm (6 ft 10.7 in)
- Height: 1,800 mm (5 ft 10.9 in)
- Crew: 4 + 2 crew
- Main armament: 1× STK 40 Automatic grenade launcher Spike Anti-tank missiles
- Secondary armament: 1-2× FN MAG
- Engine: PSA DW10B turbocharged and inter-cooled 4-cylinder common rail diesel 136 hp (101 kW)
- Payload capacity: 1,000 kg (2,204.6 lb)
- Transmission: Four-speed automatic
- Maximum speed: 110 km/h (68 mph)

The primary role of the LSV MK. II is against armoured threats. It is designed to be helicopter portable and manoeuvrable over cross-country terrain. The vehicle is equipped with enhanced networking capabilities to support the integration with other combat systems during operations.

=== Design ===
The LSV MK. II is produced by ST Kinetics as the Spider New Generation Light Strike Vehicle (Spider New Gen). In September 2011, ST Kinetics won a $68 million contract to supply its Spider New Gen and spares to the Singapore Army. The first LSV MK. II was delivered in November 2013 concluding in 2014.

ST Kinetics had designed a previous prototype vehicle to replace the Singapore Army Light Strike Vehicle named the Spider. At the Asian Aerospace 2004 held in Singapore, ST Kinetics unveiled the Spider a redesigned Light Strike Vehicle that did not enter production.

The LSV MK. II bears several enhancements vis-à-vis the LSV that it replaces. It has a more powerful engine, an improved suspension system and a better designed space frame with a higher payload. The new vehicle also has a larger seating capacity and supports an array of communication systems that enhances its networking capabilities with other combat systems in the battlefield. These enhancements allow the LSV MK. II to be more agile and deployable than its predecessor. It is capable of climbing and traversing 60% inclines and climbing slopes up to 50%.

The driver was relocated from right-hand drive to the front centre seat of the vehicle. This unique centre-hand drive enables flexible weapon configurations on both sides of the driver position for a wide arc of fire. Due to its lightweight design, the vehicle can be carried underslung by medium-lift helicopters such as CH-47 Chinook or stacked during airlift for rapid deployment by the C-130 Hercules.

The LSV MK. II is equipped with the Mantis system. At the Eurosatory 2004 held in Paris, Israeli company Rafael Armament Development Authority unveiled the Mantis system fitted to a Light Strike Vehicle (Flyer ITV-1). The Mantis is based on advanced Israeli systems RAFAEL Spike LR ATGM, RAFAEL C4I Tactical System—a rugged laptop which is the centre of the Mantis system, ESC BAZ retractable Multi-Sensor for surveillance and reconnaissance—includes a day camera, night (thermal) camera and a laser rangefinder and Azimuth Comet—provides target acquisition data such as coordinates to the targets.

=== Capabilities ===
The LSV MK. II is produced in three variants: the Automatic Grenade Launcher (AGL) variant that operates the 40 mm AGL system; the Anti-Tank Guided Missile (ATGM) variant that operates the Spike missile system; and the Utility variant for general purpose usage.

=== Operators ===
- Singapore: Guards formation of the Singapore Army, unknown
- Export sales to special forces around the world disclosed by ST Kinetics

== See also ==
- General Dynamics Flyer – (United States)
- Light Strike Vehicle – (United States)
- Desert Patrol Vehicle – (United States)
- Chenowth Advanced Light Strike Vehicle – (United States)
- P6 ATAV – (Indonesia)
- VLEGA Gaucho – (Argentina)
- Chivunk – (Brazil)
