= Chenowth Advanced Light Strike Vehicle =

Advanced Light Strike Vehicle
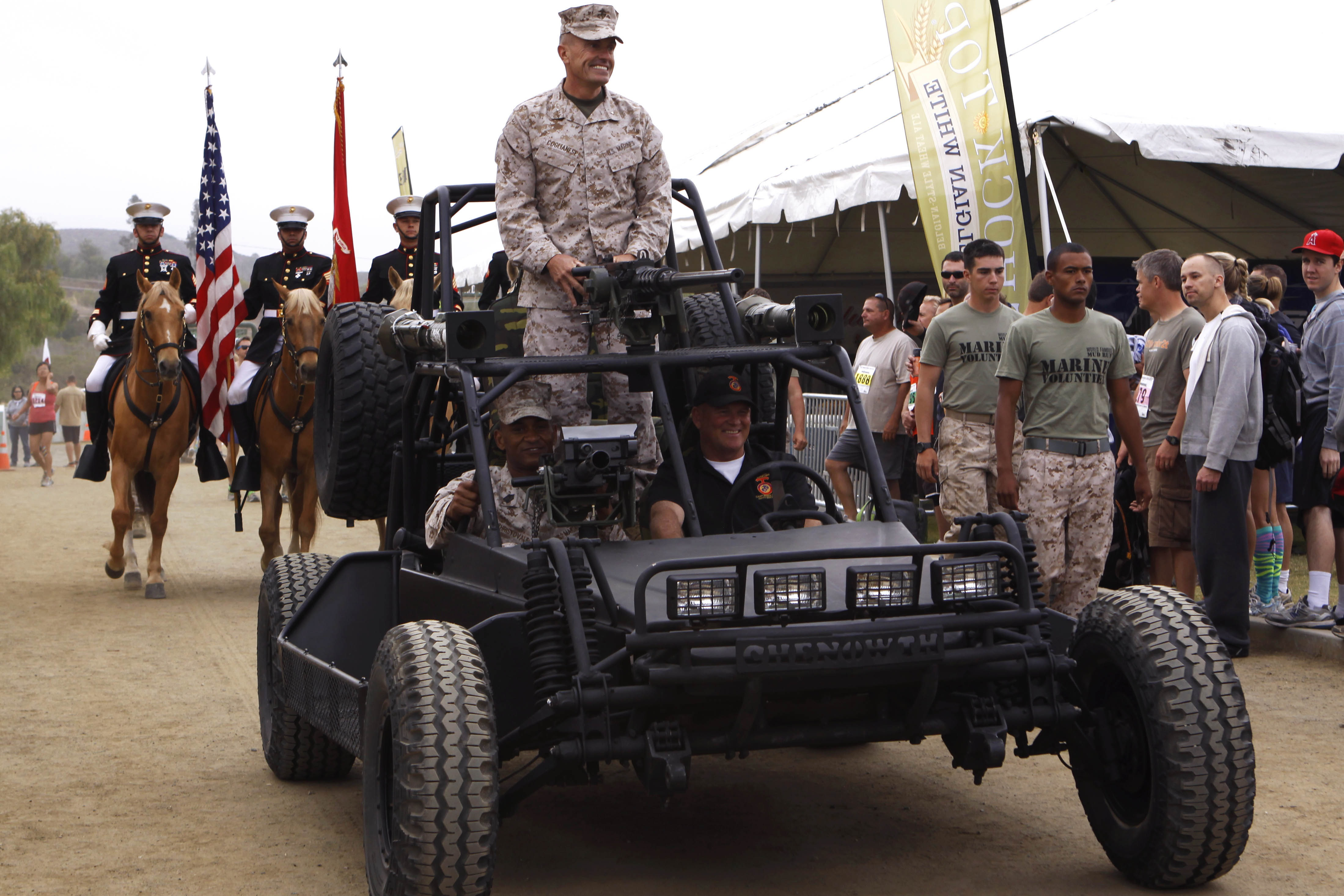
- Type: Special Attack Vehicle
- Place of origin: United States

Service history
- Used by: United States
- Wars: Operation Desert Storm; War in Afghanistan; Iraq War

Production history
- Manufacturer: Chenowth

Specifications
- Mass: 3,500 pounds (1,600 kg)
- Length: 161 inches (4.1 m)
- Width: 83 inches (2.1 m)
- Height: 79 inches (2.0 m)
- Crew: 2/ 3/ 4
- Main armament: 1 × 12.7 mm M2 machine gun or 1 × 40 mm Mk 19 grenade launcher
- Engine: Diesel/ Petrol; 160 hp

The Chenowth Advanced Light Strike Vehicle (ALSV) is an all-terrain light military vehicle developed by the United States. It is the successor to the Chenowth Light Strike Vehicle and the Desert Patrol Vehicle, and features improved performance and armament. The sandrail vehicle is relatively small, and can be carried in a transport aircraft. Although it is mainly used by the US Navy SEALs and Marine Corps, several other countries have procured it.

== Features ==
Chenowth Racing Products revealed in October 1996 that they had developed a "third-generation high-performance surveillance, light strike and reconnaissance vehicle", which they named the Advanced Light Strike Vehicle (ALSV). Based on its predecessor, the Chenowth Light Strike Vehicle (LSV), the ALSV could carry two, three or four personnel. An all-terrain vehicle, the ALSV is powered by a 160-horsepower diesel engine produced by Porsche, and is equipped with four-wheel drive functionality as well as power steering. A version powered by a gasoline engine has also been produced.

An ALSV can be transported in a CH-47 Chinook or CH-53 Sea Stallion transport helicopter. Three can be carried in a C-130 Hercules transport, while two can be carried for para-dropping. The crew is covered only by an upper frame of tubular bars, although light armor can be added. The ALSV weighs 3,500 pounds (1,600 kg), and has a length of 161 inches (4.1 m) and a width of 83 inches (2.1 m). It is 79 inches (2.0 m) in height, and has a ride height of 16 inches (0.41 m). The ALSV can accelerate from 0 to 30 miles per hour (48 km/h) in 4 seconds, and is capable of negotiating up to 75% gradients and 50% side slopes.

== Armament ==
The main weapons station, which is positioned to the rear of the vehicle, is capable of traversing 360 degrees and can accommodate either an M2 Browning heavy machine gun or a Mk 19 grenade launcher. Light machine guns and portable anti-armor weapons like the M136 AT4 may be carried as secondary armament. The weapons platforms can be remote controlled and feature gun stabilizing, allowing accurate fire while on the move.

== Users ==
The ALSV has been used by the United States Navy SEALs in Iraq and Afghanistan. Prior to this, both the SEALs and the United States Marine Corps had used the vehicle during Operation Desert Storm. ALSVs have also been procured by Jordan and the United Arab Emirates.

According to Chenowth, they are also used by several Central American and Middle Eastern countries, as well as some member countries of NATO.

== See also ==
- Kojak (vehicle) – (Bolivia)
- General Dynamics Flyer – (United States)
- P6 ATAV – (Indonesia)
- VLEGA Gaucho – (Argentina)
- Chivunk – (Brazil)
- Fabrique Nationale AS 24 – (Belgium)
- FMC XR311 – (United States)
- Light Strike Vehicle – (Singapore)
