= Dune buggy =

Off-road vehicle

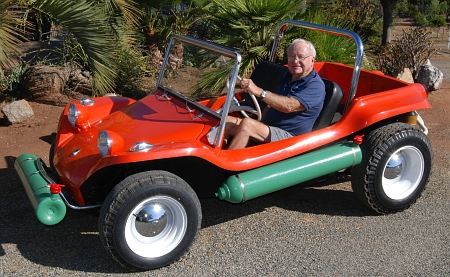
Meyers Manx by Bruce Meyers

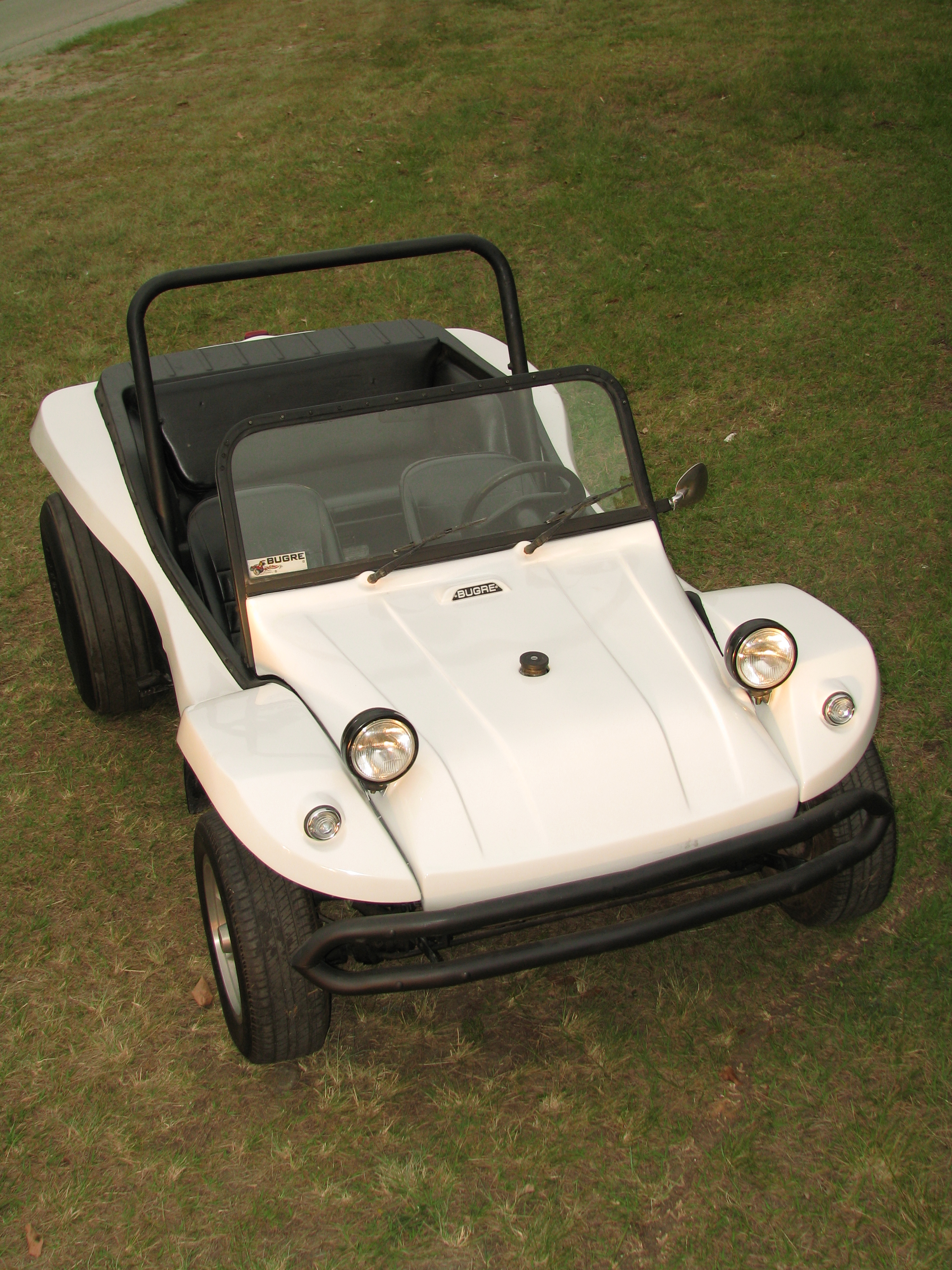
Bugre II, a Brazilian buggy made in the early 1970s

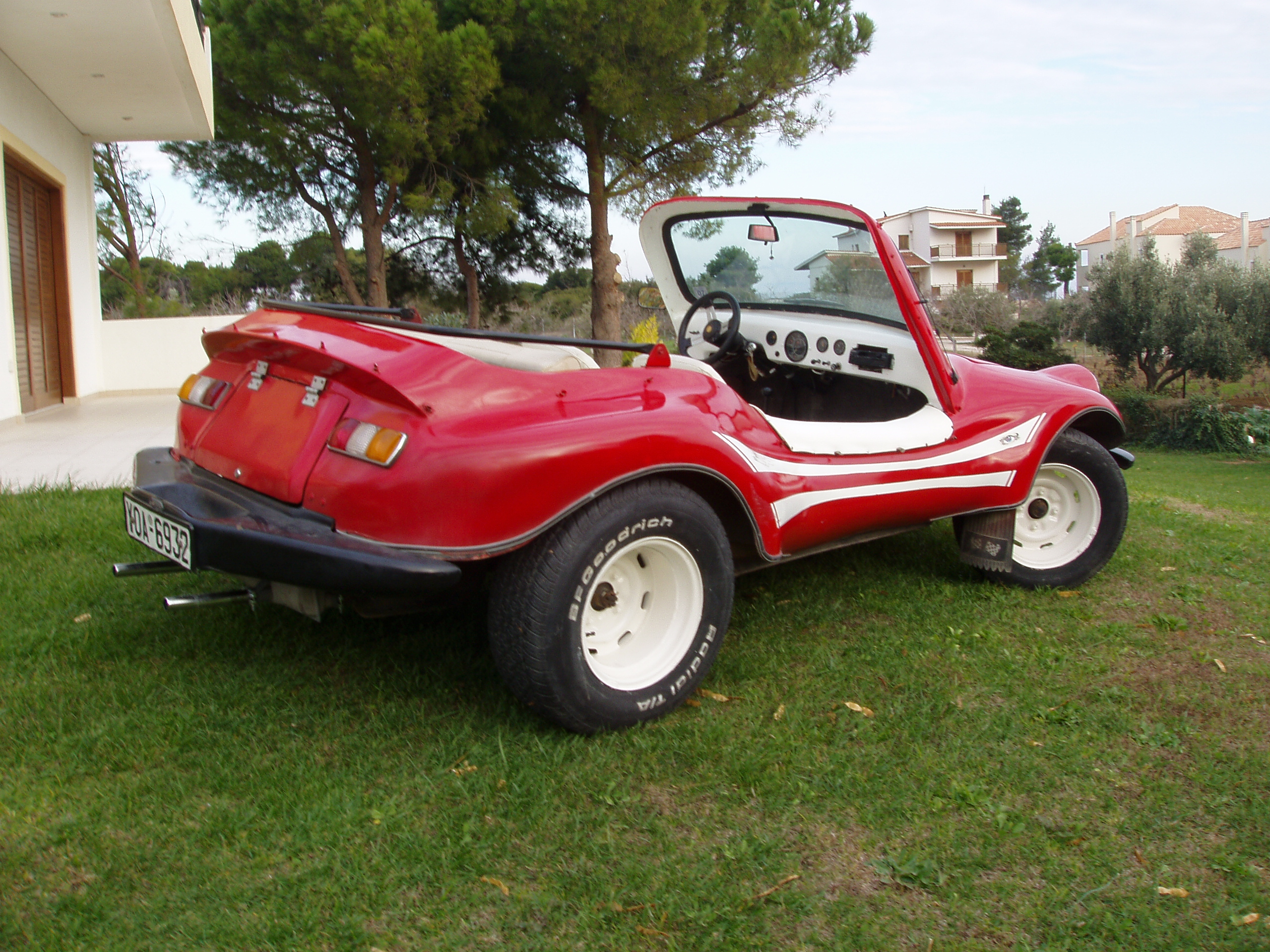
Greek beach buggy built by Pan-Car in 1980s

A dune buggy, also known as a beach buggy, is a recreational off-road vehicle with large wheels, and wide tires, designed for use on sand dunes, beaches, off-road or desert recreation. The design is usually a topless vehicle with a rear-mounted engine. A dune buggy can be created by modifying an existing vehicle or custom-building a new vehicle.

== Design ==
Dune buggies are typically created by modifying an existing road vehicle, while sandrails are built from the ground up as a custom vehicle.

=== Beetle-based buggies ===
For dune buggies built on the chassis of a rear-engined existing vehicle, the Volkswagen Beetle has been most commonly used as the basis for the buggy, though conversions were made from other rear-engined cars (such as the Corvair and Renault Dauphine). The model is nicknamed Bug, lending partial inspiration to the term "buggy." The Beetle platform chassis was used because the rear engine layout improves traction, the air-cooled engine avoids the complexities and failure points associated with a water-cooled engine, the Beetle's front torsion bar suspension was not only considered cheap and robust, but it was also extremely easy to alter and adjust its ride-height. Furthermore, spare parts — and donor vehicles themselves — were cheap and readily available. While early dune buggy conversions were left with no body, or featured custom bodies of sheet metal (such as the EMPI Sportsters and similar buggies), glass-reinforced plastic (fiberglass) bodies, developed in the 1960s, have become the standard image of the modern buggy, and come in many shapes and sizes.

The original fiberglass dune buggy was the 1964 "Meyers Manx" built by Bruce Meyers. Bruce Meyers designed his fiberglass bodies as a "kit car", using the Volkswagen Beetle chassis. Many other companies worldwide have been inspired by the Manx, making similar bodies and kits. These types of dune buggies are known as "clones".

=== Sandrail ===
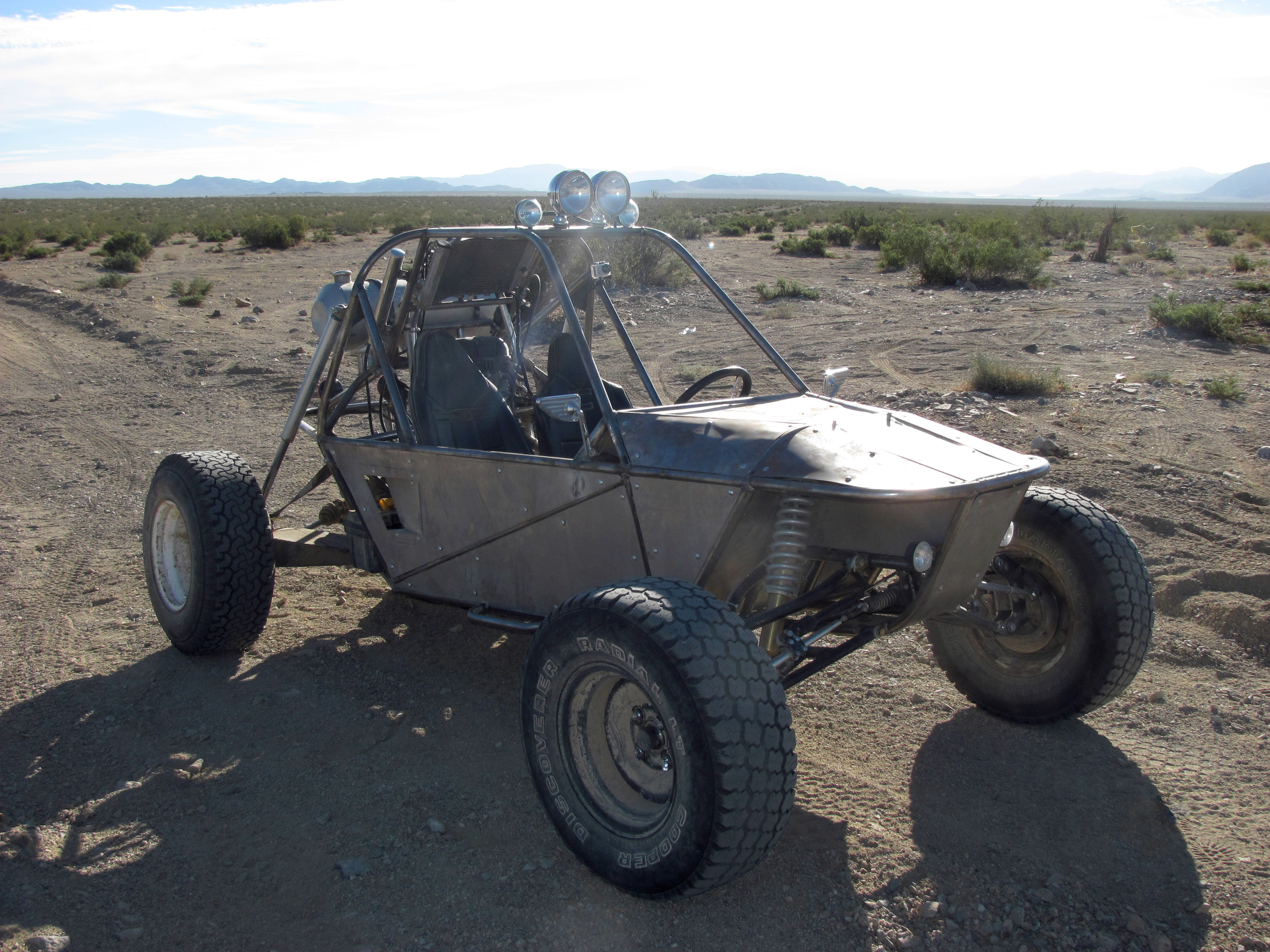
A custom buggy

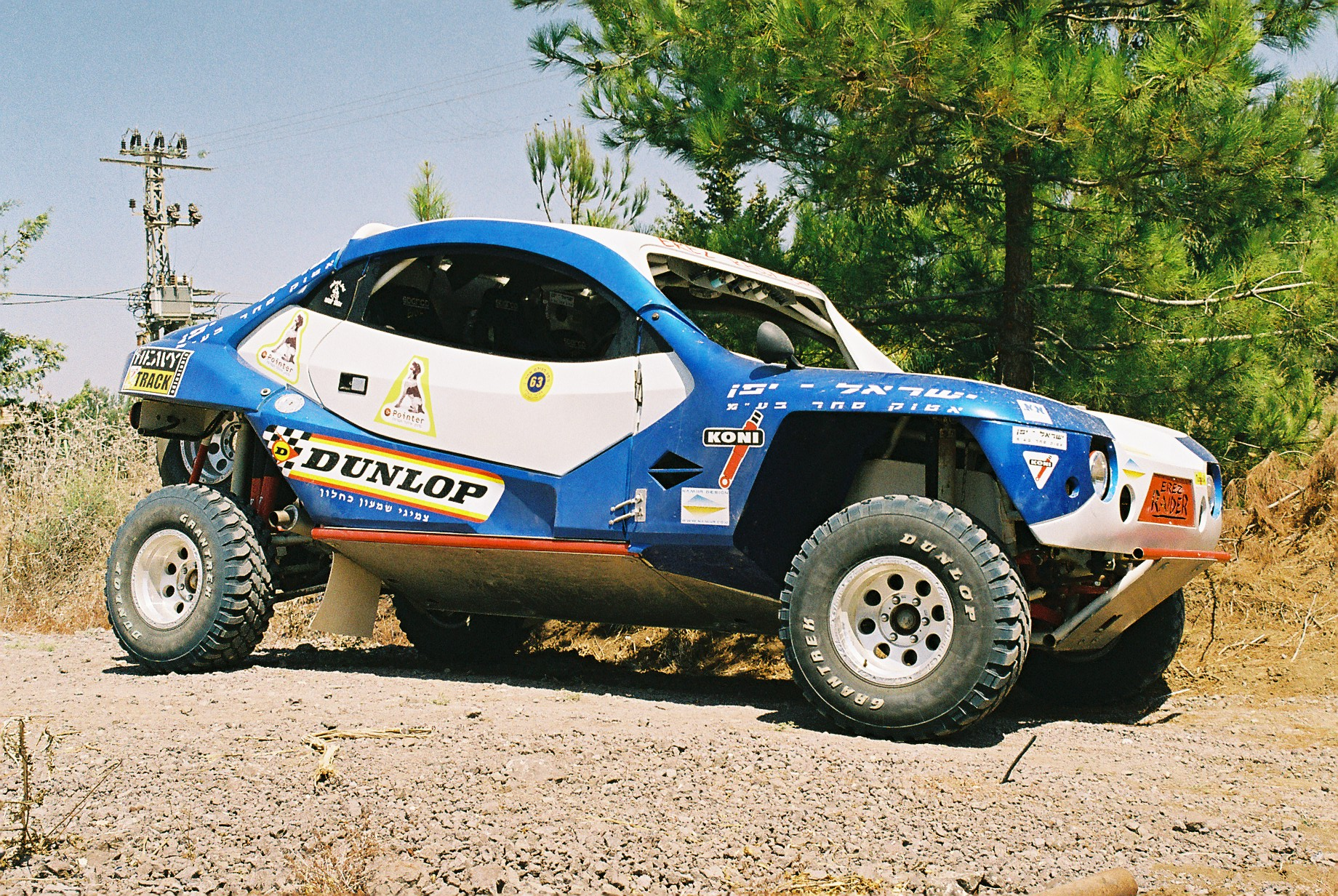
Racing buggy with a V8 engine and fiberglass body

A sandrail is a lightweight vehicle similar to a dune buggy, but designed specifically for operation on open sand.

Sandrails are usually built as a spaceframe by welding steel tubes together. The name sandrail is due to the frame "rails" present. The advantage of this method is that the fabricator can change fundamental parts of the vehicle (usually the suspension and addition of a built-in roll cage). Sandrails, as per dune buggies, often have the engine located behind the driver. Sizes can vary from a small-engine one-seat size to four-seat vehicles with eight or more cylinders.

A similar, more recent generation of off-road vehicle, often similar in appearance to a sandrail, but designed for a different use, is the "off road go-kart". The difference may be little more than fitting all-terrain tires instead of sand tires and the much smaller size of the engine.

== Military use ==
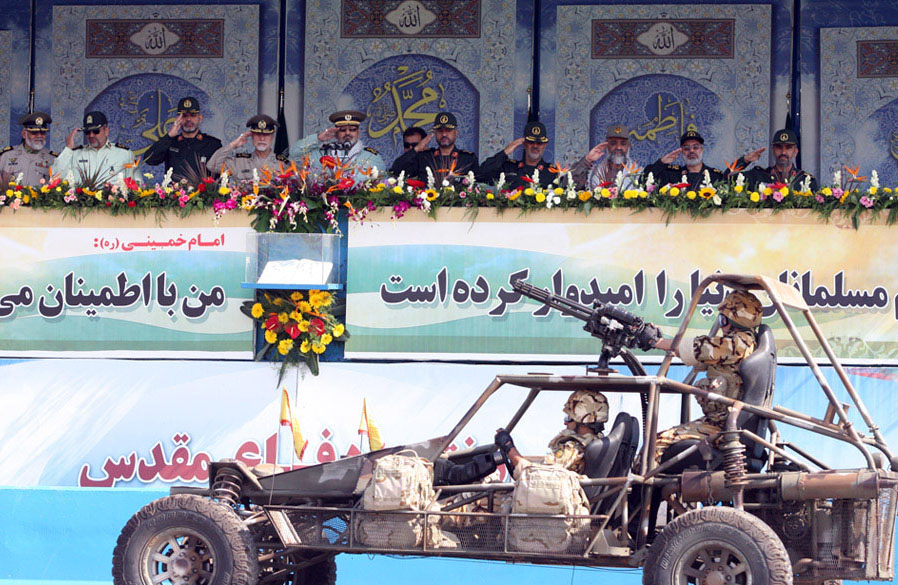
An Iranian military dune buggy

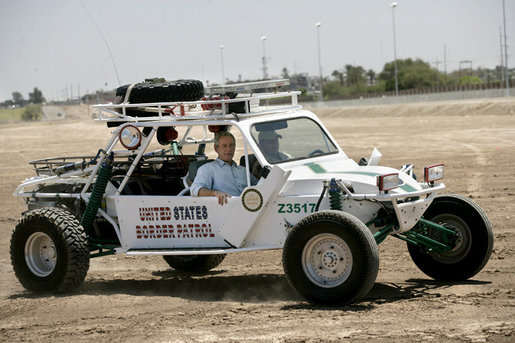
George W. Bush riding a US Border Patrol dune buggy

Because of the advantages a buggy can afford on some terrain, they are also used by the military.

The buggies built for the United States military used to be called Desert Patrol Vehicles (DPV) or Fast Attack Vehicles (FAV), and with the latest improvements are known as Light Strike Vehicles (LSV). They are used by United States Navy SEALs, the SAS, and other forces. Among the dune buggies used by the United States military is the Chenowth Advanced Light Strike Vehicle. The US Border Patrol also uses this (although it is not a military organization).

In the United Kingdom, the Special Air Service (SAS) have used cut-down, light-weight all terrain vehicles for secret special operations "behind the lines" since early in World War II. A buggy was used by the SAS during the Gulf War. A long-range special desert operations vehicle was developed in 1992 and nicknamed "pink panthers" because of their color, but these were only modified Land Rovers. Cuba has been known to use Dune Buggies for military use.

== See also ==
- Buggy (automobile)
- Autozodiaco
- Baja Bug
- Citroën Méhari
- EMPI Imp
- Mini Moke
- Volkswagen 181
- Yamabuggy
- Tomcar
- Watch Out, We're Mad! (Film)
