= Tatra Baghira =

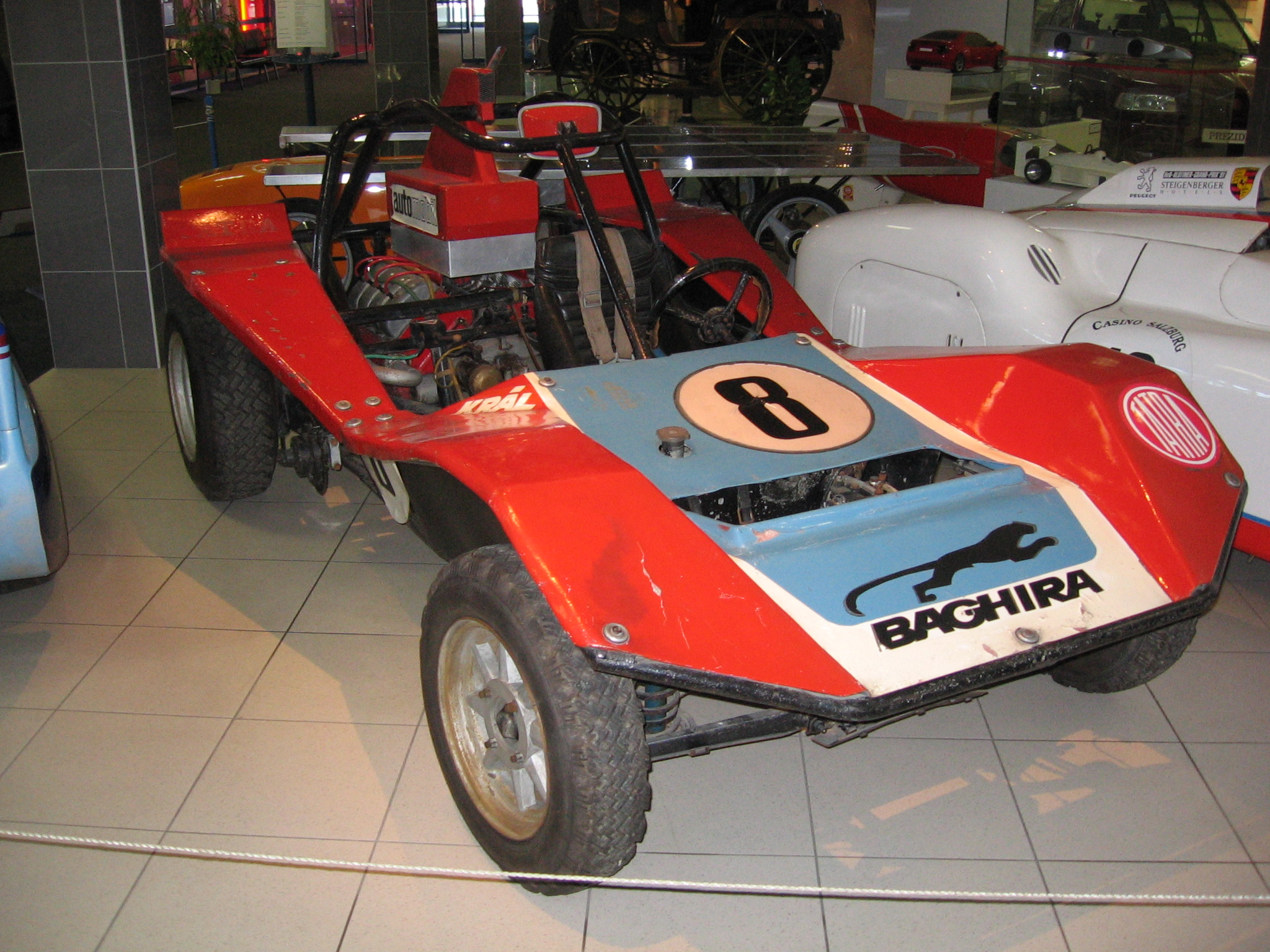
- Tatra Baghira for autocross

Overview
- Manufacturer: Tatra
- Production: 1970–1974
- Designer: Václav Král

Powertrain
- Engine: V8 engine
- Transmission: 4+1 manual

Dimensions
- Kerb weight: 570 kg (1,257 lb)

The Tatra Baghira was a dune buggy designed and built by Václav Král in the 1970s. The structure of the car was used in various vehicles, and aircraft parts. Chassis and body were built by Král aided by a team of industry enthusiasts. The first car was built in 1970. The name Baghira came from the name of the black panther in Rudyard Kipling's The Jungle Book (1894).
