= Light Strike Vehicle =

American light attack vehicle

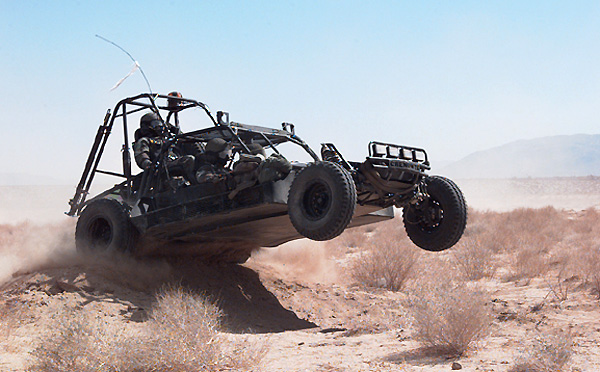
- Type: Light Attack Vehicle
- Place of origin: United States

Service history
- In service: unknown–present
- Wars: War on terrorism

Production history
- Designed: unknown
- Manufacturer: Chenowth Racing Products

Specifications
- Mass: 960 kilograms
- Length: 4.08 m
- Width: 2.11 m
- Height: 2.01 m
- Crew: 1 driver and 1 gunner + 2 passengers
- Main armament: 1 X 12.7 mm M2 caliber HMG, 1 x 5.56 mm M249 SAW LMG, 1 x 7.62 mm M60 or M240 series GPMG
- Secondary armament: 2 x AT4 light Anti-Tank Weapons, or 1 x TOW
- Engine: Diesel ?
- Power/weight: ?
- Suspension: ?
- Operational range: 500 km
- Maximum speed: 130 km/h on-road; 110 km/h off-road.

The Light Strike Vehicle (LSV) is an improved version of the Desert Patrol Vehicle (DPV), which it was designed to replace. Special operation groups adopted the LSV for its small size and high mobility. It is part of the family of Internally Transportable Light Strike Vehicles (ITV-LSV). As the name suggests, it is used for fast hit-and-run style raids, scouting missions, special forces support, and low intensity guerrilla warfare.

== Design ==
=== Countermeasures ===
The LSV is entirely unarmored, and thus offers no protection from small arms fire. The driver and passengers sit side by side in front, with the gunner sitting in an elevated rear-central seat in front of the engine. The gunner's seat can spin around to operate the 7.62 mm GPMG.

=== Mobility ===
It can be air transported internally by CH-47 or CH-53 transport helicopters. The new ALSV has a more conventional appearance and differs from the original versions.

=== Armament ===
A 7.62 mm MG (often an M60E3) is mounted rear-facing on the back of the engines. If TOW is mounted, it replaces the third passenger and rollover cage. Two AT4 are sometimes fitted forward-facing on roll over cage bars (one on each side) above driver.

== Users ==
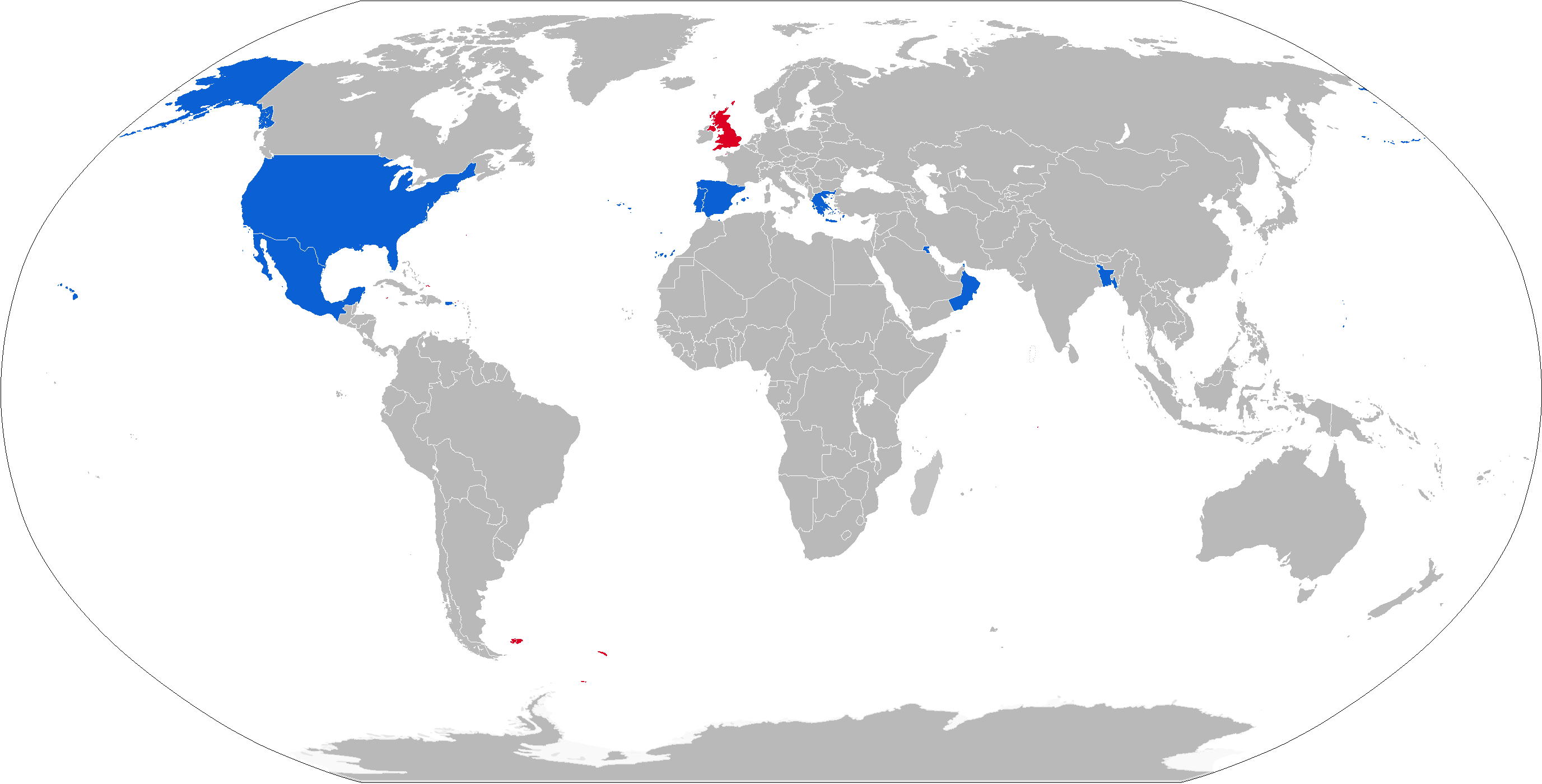
Operators: Current Former

Unlike the DPV, the LSV has had export success and is marketed as a light attack vehicle. The current generation model is the ALSV, with the "A" standing for "advanced". It is currently used by the United States Marine Corps, United States Army, United States Navy, and the armed forces of Greece, Mexico, Oman, Portugal, and Spain. The UK retired its LSVs in the mid-1990s.

=== Current operators ===
- Bangladesh
- Greece
- Kuwait
- Mexico
- Oman
- Portugal
- Spain
- United States

=== Former operators ===
- United Kingdom

== See also ==
- Chenowth Advanced Light Strike Vehicle – (United States)
- P6 ATAV – (Indonesia)
- VLEGA Gaucho – (Argentina)
- Chivunk – (Brazil)
- Fabrique Nationale AS 24 – (Belgium)
- List of land vehicles of the U.S. armed forces
- List of U.S. military vehicles by model number, (M1040 and M1041)
- Willys FAMAE Corvo – (Chile)
- FMC XR311 – (United States)
- Saker LSV – (United Kingdom)
