= Saker LSV =

The Wessex Saker Light Strike Vehicle was a British Army light vehicle similar to a sandrail. They were produced in the late 1980s for the British Special Air Service.

Design was by Wessex and Devonport Management Limited. The frame was welded tube and power, to the rear wheels only, was from a Volkswagen 1.6 litre air-cooled petrol engine. It was a two-man vehicle which could be armed with either a 7.62 mm GMPG or a 0.5 inch M2 machine gun.

The vehicles were used as a mobile platform to mount heavy weapon systems including anti-tank missiles. The vehicle could be carried on the larger helicopters, such as the CH-47 Chinook or the UH-60 Blackhawk.

== See also ==
- Desert Patrol Vehicle/Light Strike Vehicle
- Light Strike Vehicle (Singapore)

== Notes and references ==
- Military Vehicle club featured vehicles
