= Yamabuggy =

A buggy

The Yamabuggy is a side-by-side dune buggy. It made its international debut in Las Vegas, Nevada, at the SEMA Convention. It is designed to be a quick and agile competitor to vehicles such as the Yamaha Rhino.

The buggy is powered by a 400 cc Yamaha engine, capable of speeds in excess of 55 mph (89 km/h). It has a 76.8 inch wheelbase.
