= Autozodiaco =

Autozodiaco was an Italian car manufacturer located in Bologna, focusing mainly on dune buggies based on the VW Beetle. The company existed between 1968 and 1981.

== Car models (Dune buggy) ==
1. Damaca 1971-1981
2. Deserter 1968-1981 based on VW
  1. Deserter
  2. Deserter 1.2
  3. Deserter Neve
  4. Deserter Jumper
  5. Deserter Jumper 1.2
  6. Deserter Jumper 1600
3. Kirby (Based on a Skoda engine) 1972-?
4. Squalo 1971-?

== Converter kits for VW Beetle ==
California

== Motorbikes ==
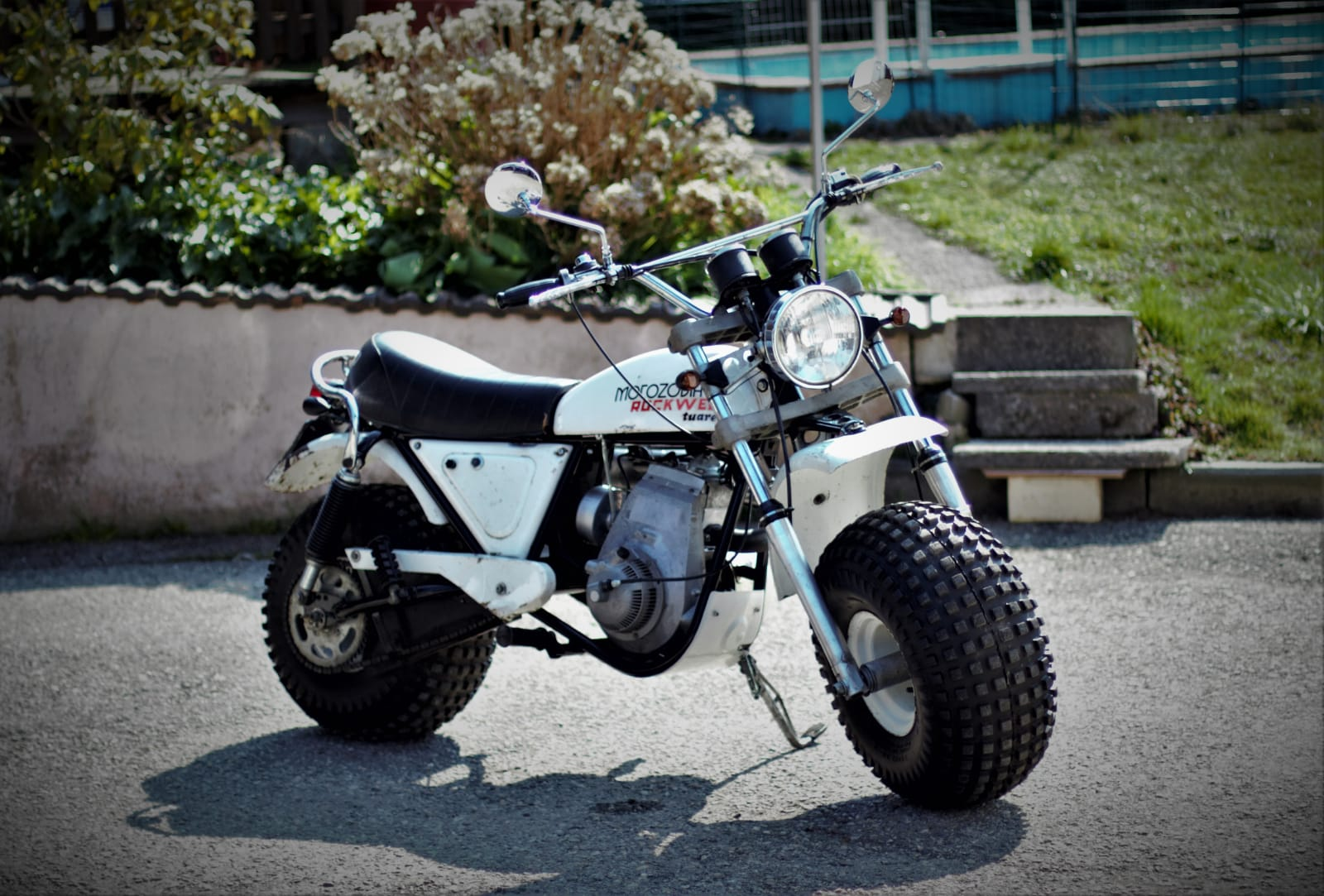
Moto Zodiaco Tuareg with ILO Rockwell 1F250-1 engine

In the 1970s they produced the offroad motorbike Moto Zodiaco Tuareg. With large balloon tyres it was intended as a dune buggy.

The Moto Zodiaco was powered by a two-stroke single cylinder 227cc motor with 20bhp, (normally found in snowmobiles) and a pulley transmission (normally found in tractors). The top speed was around 100 km/h.

The bike had a yank cord start but an electric starter was optional. It was available in colors: sunshine yellow, alpine white and red Verona.

== All Cars ==
In 1978 Autozodiaco sold the rights to construct a three-wheel micro car, renamed the All Cars Charly. It was similar in appearance to the Bond Bug and was powered by a 49cc moped engine.

== See also ==
- List of Italian companies
- List of motorcycle manufacturers
