= Ñandú (vehicle) =

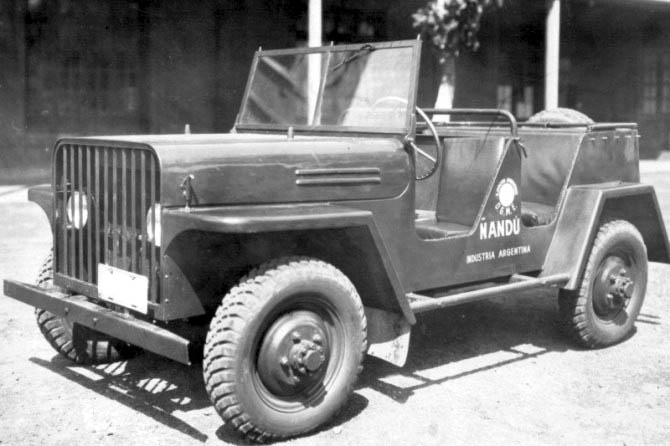

Overview
- Manufacturer: DGME
- Production: 1945
- Assembly: Buenos Aires
- Designer: Martín Reuter

Body and chassis
- Class: Off-road 4×4 vehicle

Powertrain
- Engine: 3.7 L s6 (gasoline)
- Transmission: 3-speed manual

The Ñandú was an Argentine 4×4 military light utility vehicle. Taking inspiration from the Willys MB, it was developed by the "Dirección de Materiales" in 1943 for employment by the local Army. Only four prototypes were built, with the project being finally dismissed.

== Overview ==
The Argentine Army committed Dirección de Materiales to develop and build prototype models to supply the Force. The first vehicle was named "Ñandú" (from greater rhea). Project and construction were supervised by engineer Martín Reuter, working at the Esteban De Luca workshop in Buenos Aires. As there were no manuals or materials to build a four-wheel drive system, the unit was equipped with a two-wheel drive taken from a DKW. Reuter also designed the 3-speed transmission. The engine was entirely manufactured in Argentina at "Fundiciones Santini" factory while the crankshaft was built from a Siemens Martin iron piece.

The prototype was tested on 11 September 1945. One year later, the manufacturers requested Ministry of Economy permission to start serial production of the Ñandú but it was not allowed. The Ministry alleged that Argentina was importing Willys MB vehicles from Belgium at US700 per unit, which was cheaper than producing the Ñandú.

Only four prototypes were produced, with three of them being auctioned by Banco Municipal. Reuter bought one of these models and then gave it to one of his collaborators in the project.

Apart from the Ñandú, Reuter constructed another prototype, named "Nahuel", also dismissed.

== See also ==
- VLEGA Gaucho – (Argentina)
- Willys MB – (United States)
