= Pan-Car =

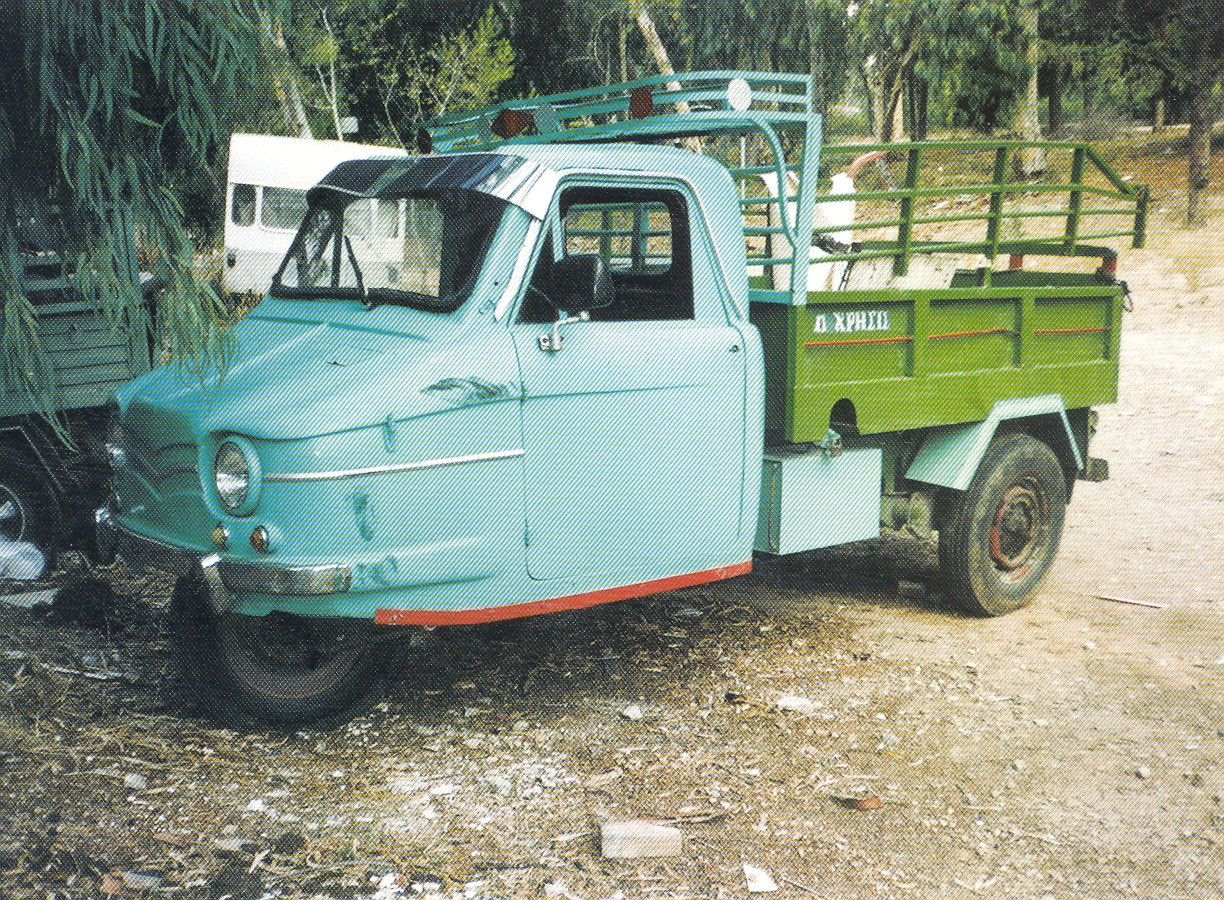
Pan-Car three-wheeler truck (1968 model)

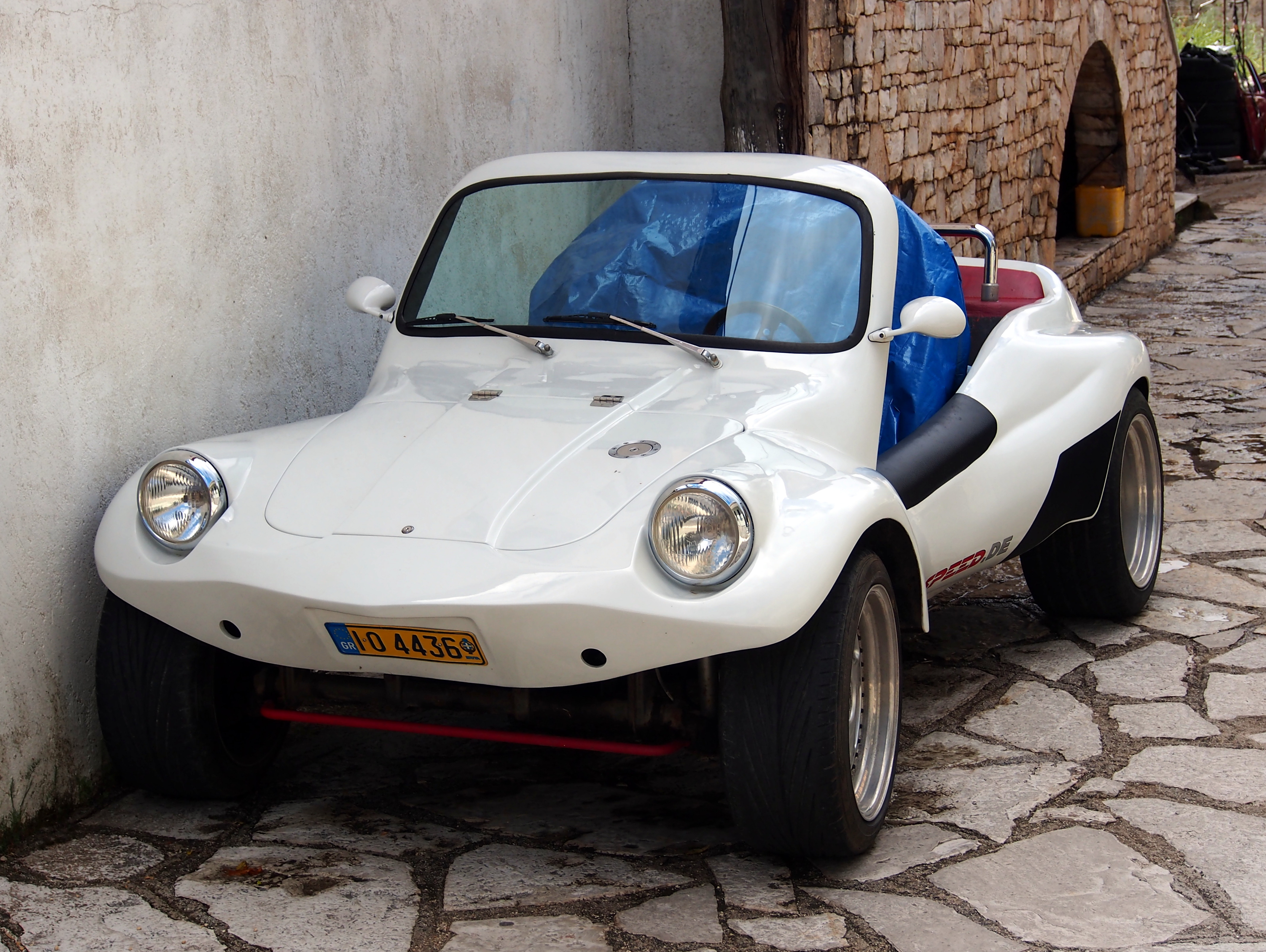
Pan-Car beach buggy (introduced in 1977)

Pan-Car was a Greek producer of automobiles and light trucks, operating between 1968 and 1994. As was often the case in Greece, its name comes from that of its founder, Panayiotis Caravisopoulos. In 1968 it was one of many Greek companies that produced three-wheeled trucks, using Volkswagen engines. In 1977 it introduced beach buggy models built on Volkswagen chassis, which were produced for several years. In 1992 it introduced a jeep-type automobile, also with Volkswagen mechanicals. The model faced a problem common to such ventures in Greece, i.e., receiving type certification for production. That, and financial problems, forced the company to go out of business in 1994.
