= Willys FAMAE Corvo =

Corvo
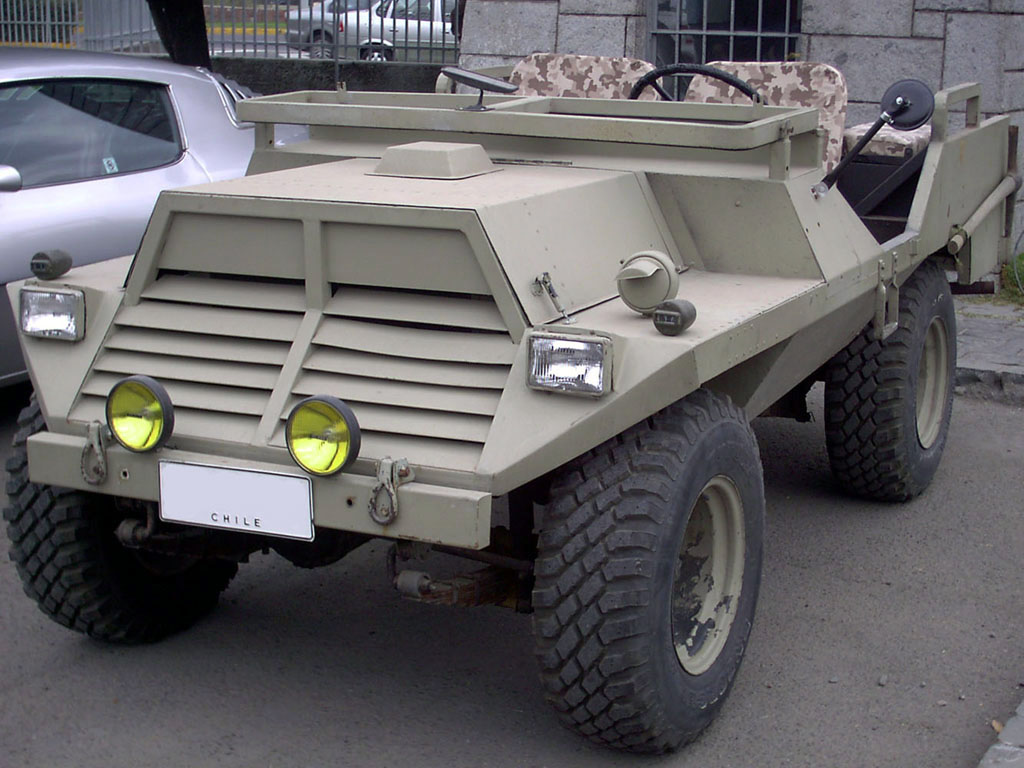

Overview
- Manufacturer: FAMAE / Willys
- Production: 2 (one confirmed)

Body and chassis
- Class: Fast Attack Vehicle / Reconnaissance
- Related: Willys MB

Chronology
- Successor: Vespek Land Rover Toqui A-2 (as a Chilean made jeep)

The Willys FAMAE Corvo was a prototype off-road multipurpose vehicle intended for use with the Chilean Armed Forces. Its chassis was from a Willys MB and was capable of carrying various types of mounted weapons, such as a 106mm recoilless anti-tank launcher.

It was designed in 1977 by Fábricas y Maestranzas del Ejército (FAMAE), to address the shortage of military equipment in Chile, caused by the Kennedy Doctrine. A single prototype was confirmed to have been produced (another was tested in another place by the Armada), which underwent trials in desert conditions for several months. It was eventually forgotten in a barn for many years.

Sales engineer René Inostroza acquired and restored it. It has since been offered for sale for 2.5 million pesos.

== See also ==
- Ñandú (jeep)
- IAME Rastrojero
- Citroën Yagan, a Chilean version of the Mehari. It was intended to use it in the Army, after the coup d'état
- MOWAG Piranha, an armored vehicle produced under license in Chile, also under FAMAE during the military government of Pinochet
