= Sandrail =

Lightweight off-road vehicle

Sandrail at Dumont Dunes CA 2011

A sandrail, also called a sand rail, rail, or sand car, is a lightweight off-road motor vehicle specifically built for traveling in sandy terrain. Synonymously referred to as dune buggies, a sandrail is a type of speciality vehicle. They are popularly operated on actual sand dunes. Sandrails can be driven on other types of terrain but are designed specifically for sand.

== History ==
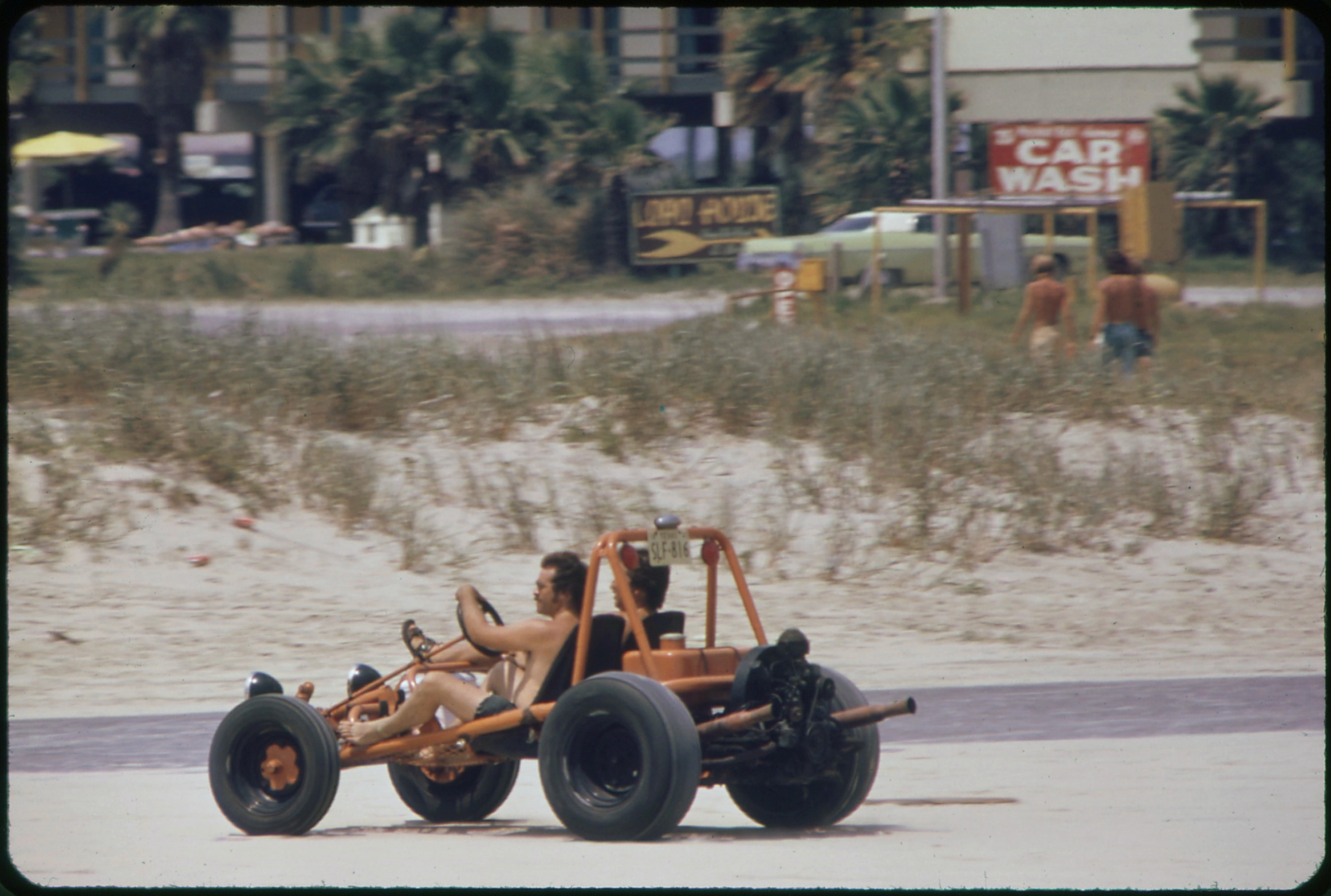
Sandrail, 1973

Sandrail frame advertisement circa 1978

At the end of World War II thousands of soldiers returning from the war had spent years driving Jeeps, tanks, and half-tracks with few or no roads. Having an increased disposable income, these GIs formed the original core of off-road enthusiasts. Initially, they used surplus Jeeps and cut-up cars to build their off-road vehicles. Soon these "off-roaders" discovered that with little more than a skid plate, they could get a stock air-cooled Volkswagen Beetle to go almost anywhere. Throughout the 1950s the sport continued to develop.

In 1958 Pete Beiring of Oceano, Calif., took the body frame or "pan" from a damaged Volkswagen and shortened it into a new machine that eventually became the precursor to the dune buggy. This eventually led to the first production dune buggy called the "Sportster", which was developed around 1960 by the EMPI Imp Company. It was an angular sheet metal vehicle built on a stripped-down Volkswagen chassis. Many others followed including the ever popular Meyers Manx design. Dune buggies had a style all their own with fiberglass siding and other "heavy" body features.

As the late 1960s and early '70s approached, enthusiasts developed lighter and more powerful sand vehicles capable of ascending steeper and higher dunes. Many started experimenting at home by building super light weight vehicle frames from metal tubing, often without a roll cage. Many were nothing more than a frame, engine, transmission, wheels and one or two seats. Because of their versatility, light weight and simplicity the air-cooled Volkswagen engine and transmission were the power plant of choice for many owners. By placing the motor and transmission in the rear of the frame it allowed the front of the sandrail to remain extremely light and thus able to "float" over the sand dunes. An added value of placing the engine in the rear of the vehicle was that heat created by the motor did not blow into the face of the driver and passengers. From the 1970s forward, sandrail builders continued to push the delicate balance between weight and power.

== Body style ==
Dumont Dunes sandrail video

When it comes to serious sand dunes, most off-road vehicles including those with four wheel drive are relatively top heavy and can only safely climb or descend steep hills with a mostly perpendicular approach to inclines or downhills. In the case of driving up a steep sand dune, many would simply "dig-in" and get stuck.

Sandrails are ultra lightweight vehicles often weighing in at 800 and 1500 pounds (≈363 and ≈680 kg). They typically use high flotation smooth or farm implement front tires and special rear paddle tires, allowing it to skim over the surface of the sand without getting stuck. A sandrail has a low center of gravity, permitting it to make tight turns even on the face of a sand dune.

Sandrail frames are built from a tubular space frame chassis that incorporates an integrated roll cage. The distinction between a sandrail and dune buggy or sand car is that the sandrail will rarely have windows, doors, fenders, or full body panels. The sandrail will also be a lighter weight vehicle compared to the sandcar. On most sandrails, the engine is typically at the rear. Some sandrails also use a mid-engine configuration. This design offers favorable weight distribution and traction, which is very desirable for dune "hill-climbing".

== Engines and fuel ==
170HP Volkswagen mid-engine performance sandrail engine.Note that the engine air intake filters have been unscrewed from the intakes for either cleaning or display purposes (See the two vertical pipes closest to the camera at the center-right of the image, and the second set of pipes in the background).

Originally becoming popular in the 1960s, sandrails used lightweight air-cooled engines like the Volkswagen engine from the VW Beetle and Porsche (~200 pounds) or the Chevrolet Corvair, Mitsubishi Minica and Cosworth DFV (~350 pounds). Because of the availability of affordable parts, the Volkswagen engine continues to be the mainstay of many sandrails today. At some point in the late 1970s in the wake of the Ford Pinto product liability cases, the first alternative engine was sourced from the Pinto, primarily the 2.0L and 2.3L. More recently, some enthusiasts have turned to lighter weight water-cooled engines such as the Subaru boxer or GM Ecotec engines.

The need for more power comes from necessity and desire when driving in steep sand dunes. This has driven sandrail engine builders to add performance features to engines such as the stock (24 to 50 horse power) Volkswagen engine. These include: larger pistons, turbochargers, dual racing carburetors, fuel injection, and high performance cylinder heads. Some performance engines can run on premium unleaded gasoline. However, many high performance engines must use racing fuel or fuel additives. A high performance sandrail Volkswagen engine can produce well into the 170-200+ horse power range and as high as 700 horse power with methanol fuel.

Most sandrails use a manual transmission, although automatic transmissions are used as well.

== Accessories ==
Early sandrails often consisted of little more than a steering wheel, brakes and accelerator. However, today an entire industry is built around all kinds of accessories such as HID and LED headlamps, radios, passenger communications headsets and GPS navigation devices.

== Other applications ==
US Navy SEAL sandrail, 2010

Some states in the USA, such as Arizona and Utah, allow the registration of sandrails and other primarily off-road vehicles for "on-road" use. In these states, sandrails registered for on-road use usually must meet the minimum insurance coverage required by normal vehicles. Additionally, they may require modifications to be road worthy. These requirements typically include a wind shield, turning signals, and license plate. These requirements may vary by state.

Sandrails have been employed by US state authorities, the United States Border Patrol and even the military. They are still in use today by the Navy SEALs. The military design of these vehicles is based on the Chenowth Advanced Light Strike Vehicle model and have been modified for a third seat above the engine to control a .50 caliber machine gun and other armaments. State authorities, such as rangers at sand dune parks sometimes employ sandrails, removing the passenger seat to convert the sandrail into a makeshift ambulance with a stretcher.

Although sandrails are primarily designed for the sand, they have been successfully used on "soft pack" dirt, mud and even snow. Some of these types of applications usually require the use of off-road type tires versus "sand" tires. They are typically not well suited for rocky terrain due to their mostly limited suspension and lighter duty frames.

== Safety ==
Accidents most often occur in collisions with other off-road vehicles, and are frequently the result of not being seen. In many dune areas, all sand vehicles (motorcycles, quads, sandrails, UTVs and sandcars) are required to use an eight-foot antenna whip and flag. This is critical to being seen by other vehicles as a driver traverses from one dune to the next. Most sandrails employ a variety of safety features for the driver and passengers. The most common is the use of a three-point safety belt system. Many sand rails also utilize roll bar padding and fire extinguishers. More advanced safety features sometimes include: arm and wrist restraints, netting for large frame openings, automatic fuel cut-off switches and horns. Additionally, the use of eye protection (goggles and ballistic-grade glasses) is considered a necessity. Finally, the use of helmets while "duning" is increasing due to the advances in performance. Sand associations along with state and federal land management agencies work to provide dune safety information through pamphlets, online and in classes.

== Future, industry and associations ==
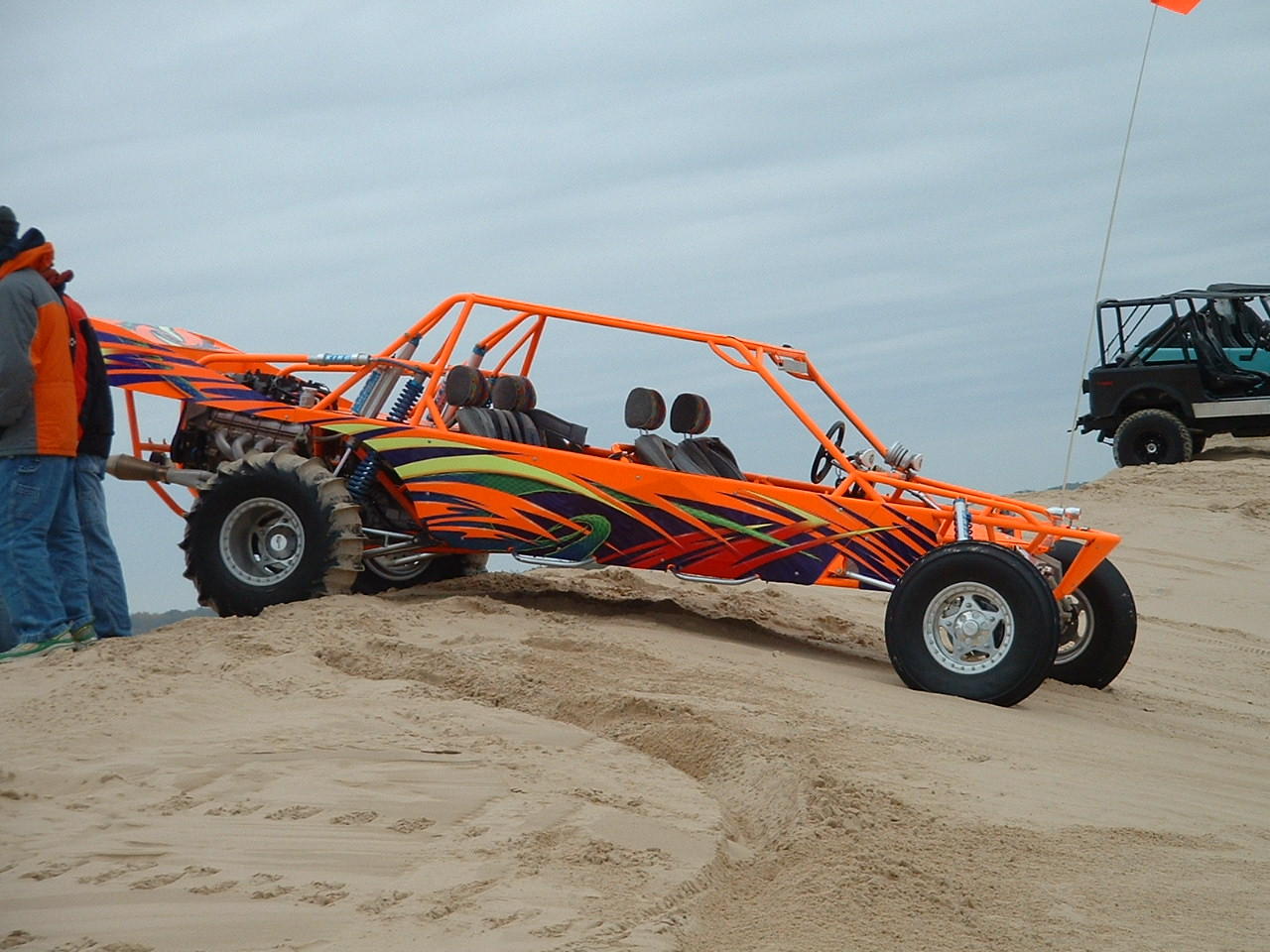
Sandcar at Silver Lake Sand Dunes

Due to its economical cost to build and maintain, access to new parts and balance between weight and power, the sandrail is still used by many enthusiasts today. However, the heavier and typically more powerful sandcar now represents another style for duners. This style often employs cars weighing several thousand pounds and using advanced suspension systems and transmissions coupled with large performance V8 engines such as the latest GM LS engine series, Ford Coyote engine series or the Rover V8 series.

Associations such as ASA hold events throughout the year in some parts of the country for sand racing and hill climbing. Additionally, these associations provide representation for enthusiasts with legislators and land management officials.
