= VLEGA Gaucho =

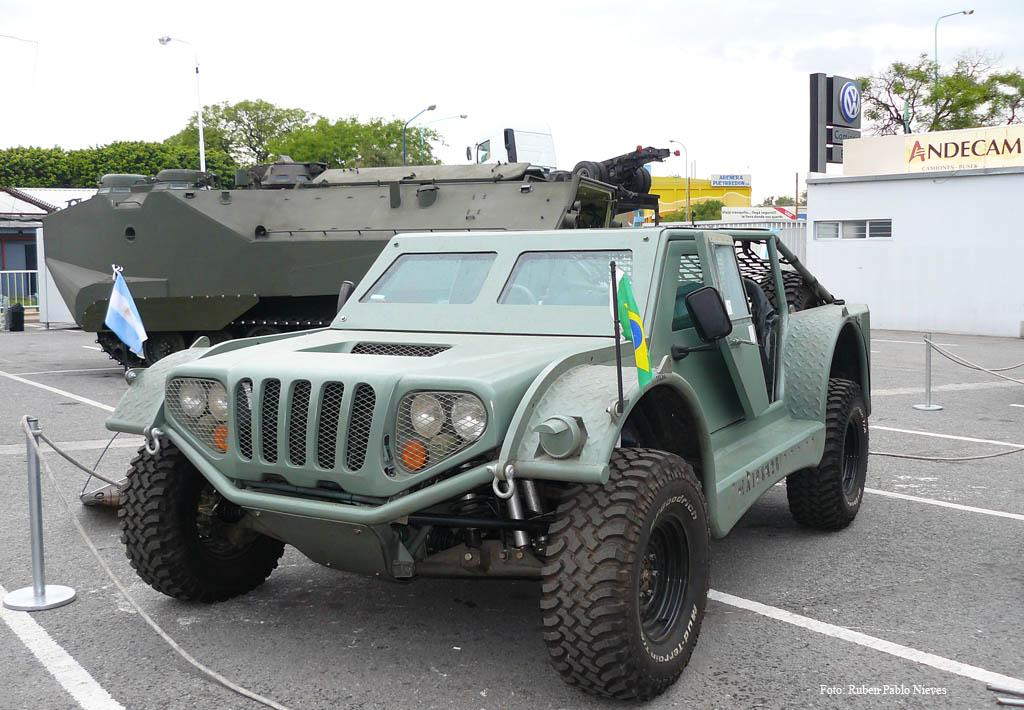
- Armored version of the Gaucho, exhibited in 2007
- Type: Wheeled all-terrain vehicle
- Place of origin: Argentina, Brazil

Service history
- In service: –

Specifications
- Crew: 4-6
- Main armament: depends on the version
- Engine: MWM 2.8-liter diesel 130 hp
- Suspension: 4x4
- Operational range: 500 km
- Maximum speed: 120 km/h

The VLEGA (an acronym for "Vehículo Liviano de Empleo General Aerotransportable" (General Employment Airborne Light Vehicle)) Gaucho was a prototype of a military light utility 4x4 vehicle, capable of being transported by air. It was developed by Argentina and Brazil in the 2000s for employment by their militaries. Some of its uses included: cargo/transport, reconnaissance, ambulance, special operations.

Nicknamed "the Hummer of Mercosur" when it was released by presidents of Argentina and Brazil, Néstor Kirchner and Lula da Silva in 2005, the Gaucho Project was first abandoned by the Brazilian Government and finally cancelled by the Argentina Government in 2016.

Brazil then focused on developing the Chivunk fast attack vehicle.

== History ==
The prototype of Light Vehicle Employment General Aerotransportável was presented March 27, 2006, at Army Headquarters in Brasília - DF, for the Brazilian Army Commander, General Francisco Roberto de Albuquerque, and the Chief of General Staff of the Argentine Army, General Roberto Fernando Bendini.

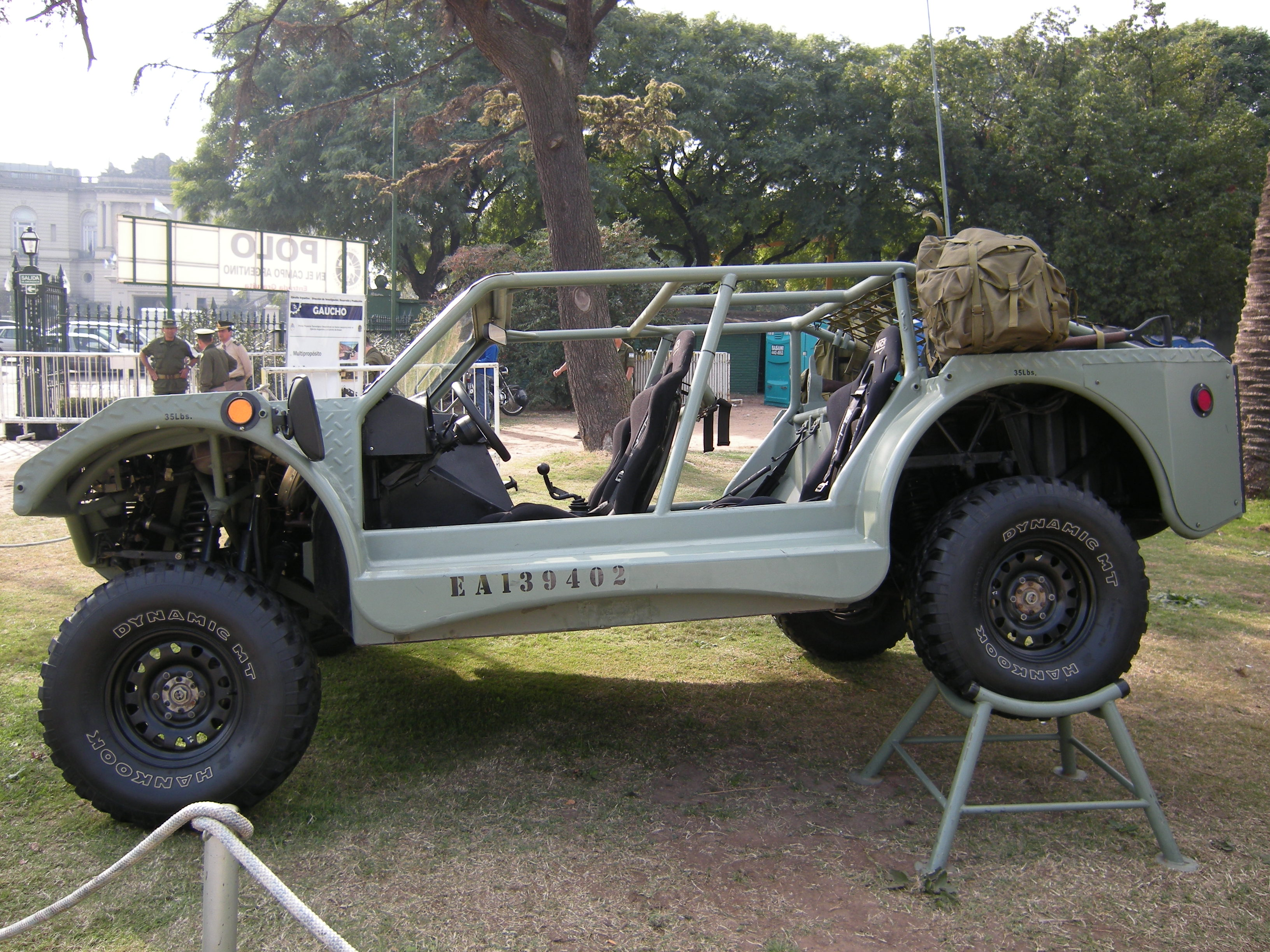
A Gaucho during the Argentine Army exposition in May 2008

The Car Light Employment was the initial design of the Scientific and Technological Exchanges between the armies of Brazil and Argentina. This exchange implements within the Army, the Agreement on Scientific and Technological Cooperation signed between the governments of Argentina and the Federative Republic of Brazil, on May 17, 1980.

In Brazil, the project was conducted by the Technological Center of the Army (CTEx) and in Argentina by the Dirección de Investigación Desarrollo y Producción Army in that country. The project began in April 2004 when it was held in Rio de Janeiro, the first working meeting, which were agreed Technical Requirements Operating a car that should meet. The definition of principal components, the layout of the car and the responsibilities of each work team was the first step to achieving the vehicle Argentina / Brazil. The engine, gearboxes and differentials and transfer, produced in Brazil, were sent to the Argentine team that designed the tubular frame and independent suspension. The prototype semi-mounted arrived in Brazil on June 16, 2005 for completion of work carried out in the workshops of War Arsenal of Rio de Janeiro.

The car was performing engineering tests at the Center for reviews of the Army (CAEX) and soon will undergo technical and operational assessments, according to modern methods of assessment of the Brazilian Army. It was designed to meet about 60 requirements previously defined by the two hosts. The Gaucho was projected to be used primarily for airmobile units, since its design allows the vehicles to be stacked and transported by aircraft type C-130. The independent suspension and 4x4 traction would enable high tactical mobility in any terrain.

The vehicle was planned to fulfill missions in development of supply, transport equipment, evacuation of wounded, launching of wireless, reconnaissance, command and control, airborne operations, and special situations.

Nevertheless, the Gaucho was never mass produced so the project was first abandoned by the Brazilian Government due to disagreements with Argentine engineers, and finally cancelled by the Argentina Government in 2016, after both countries preferred to acquire other military vehicles to supply their armies, such as Agrale Marruá and Humvee.

In April 2014, Argentina lent Uruguay a Gaucho but the Uruguayan Army dismissed purchasing the vehicle.

== Specifications ==
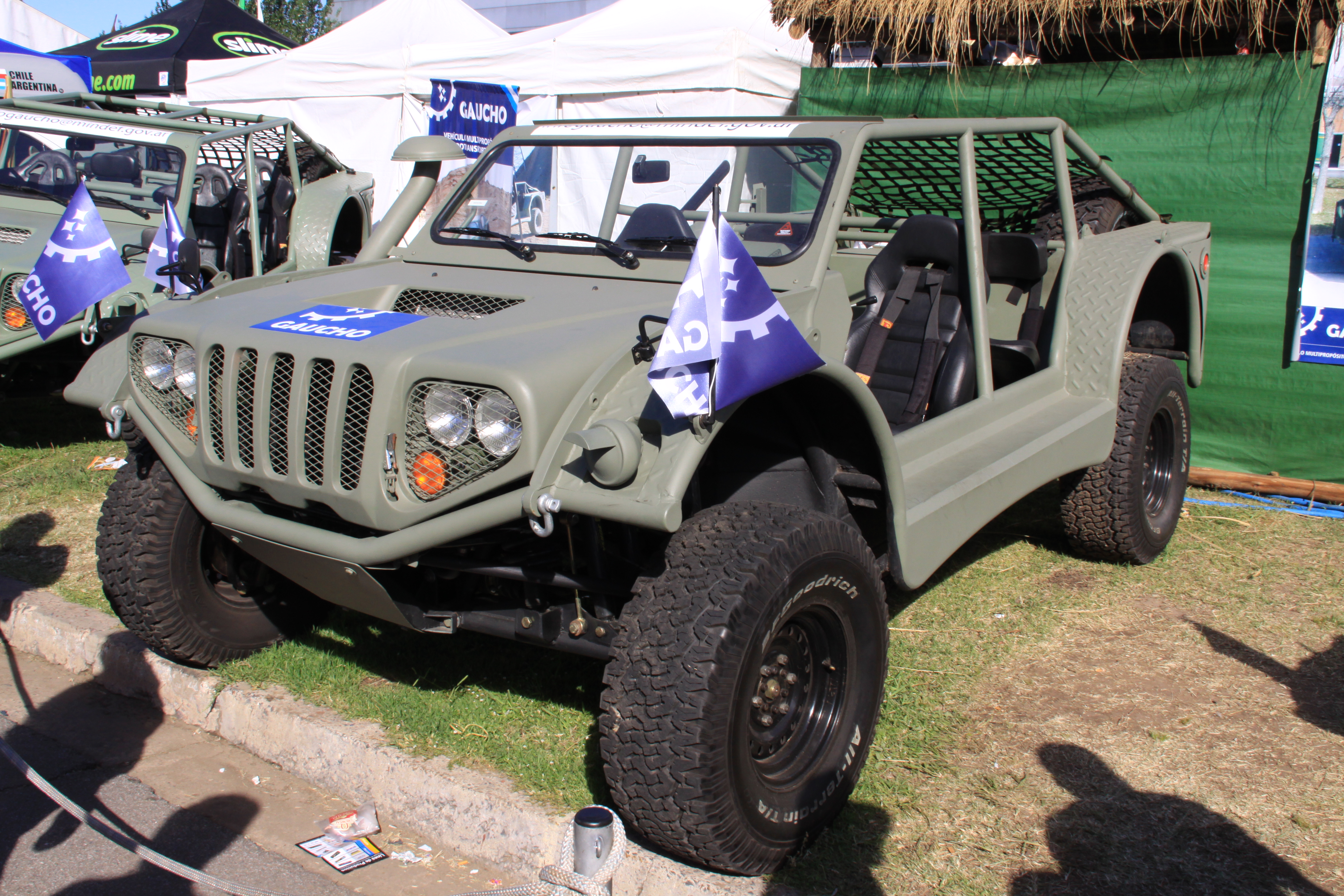
The Argentine-Brazilian jeep Gaucho

=== Engine ===
MWM, 2,800 cc, 4 cylinder, turbo-Diesel producing 130 HP @ 3.600 rpm

=== Dimensions ===
- Width: 2.15 m
- Length: 4.15 m
- Height: 1.85 m
- Wheelbase: 2.80 m
- Gauge: 1.83 m
- Ground clearance: 0.42 m
- Approach angle: 50°
- Departure angle: 40°
- Capacity: 600 kg
- Crew: Up to 4

=== Performance ===
- Maximum speed: 120 km/h
- Longitudinal ramp: 60%
- Side ramp: 40%
- Fording: 0.52 m
- Vertical obstacle: 0.36 m

=== Tires ===
BF Goodrich Off Road - 33 x 12.5 R 15

=== Armament ===
- Armament: 7.62mm machine gun FN MAG

== Gallery ==
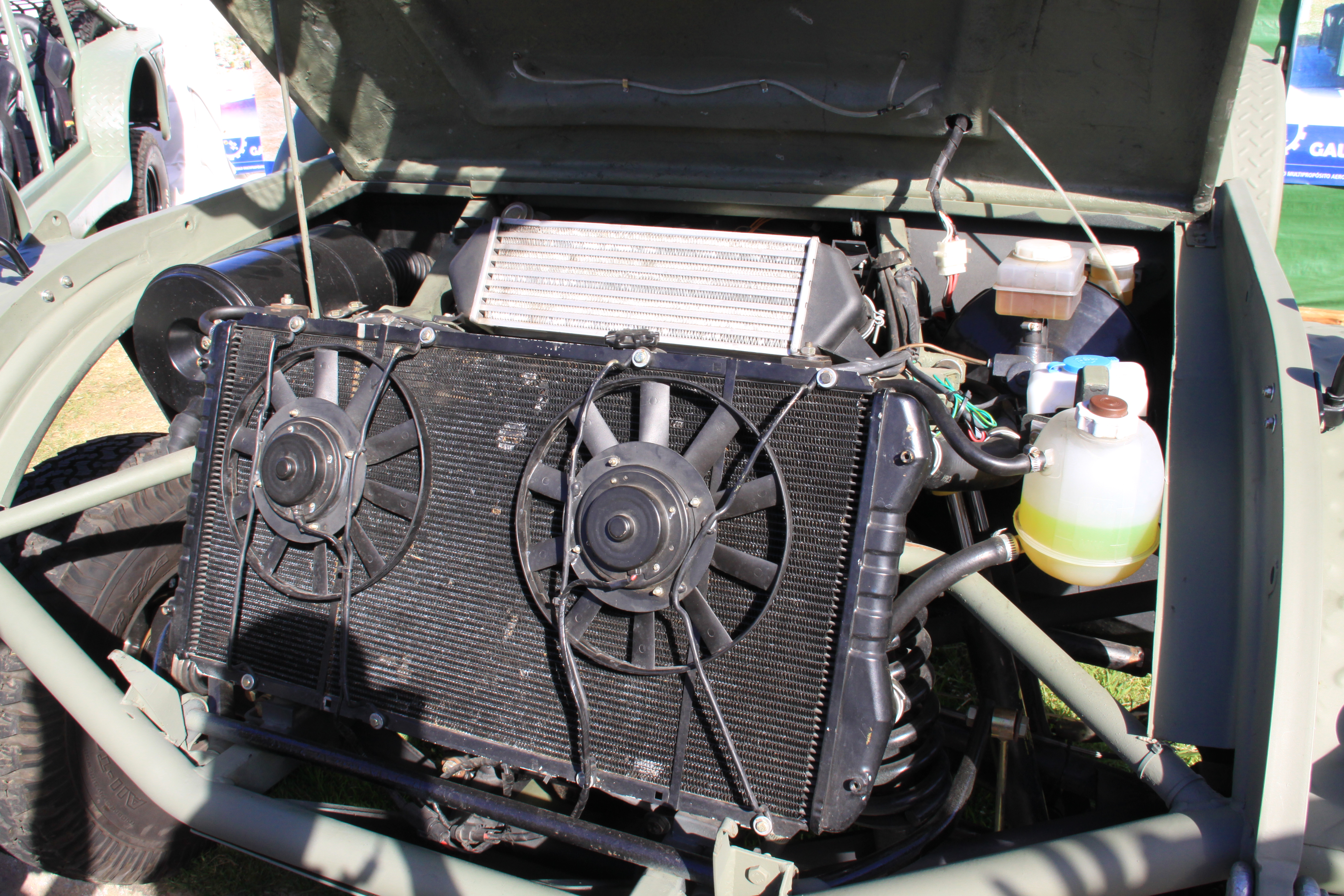
MWM turbo-diesel

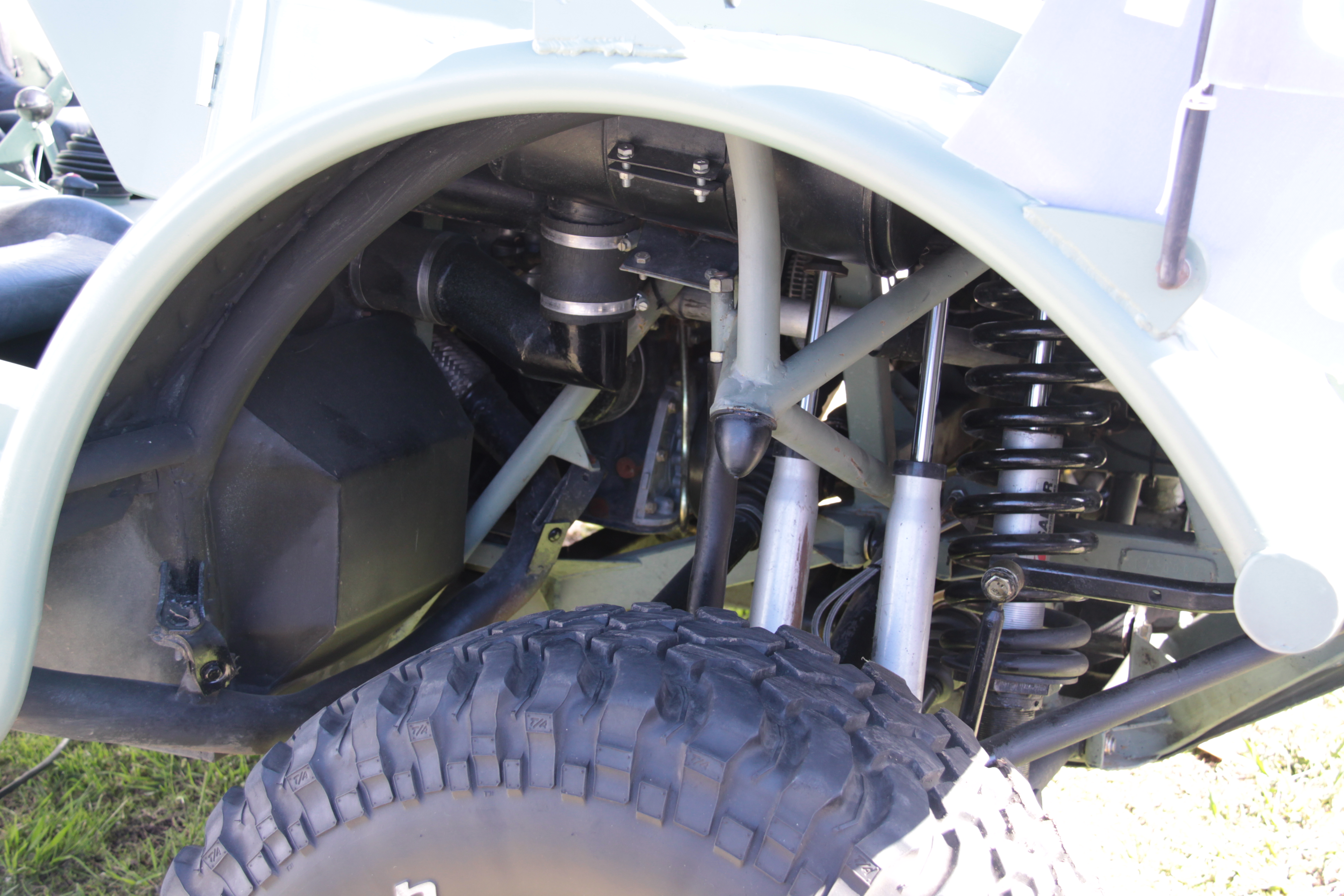
Suspension travel

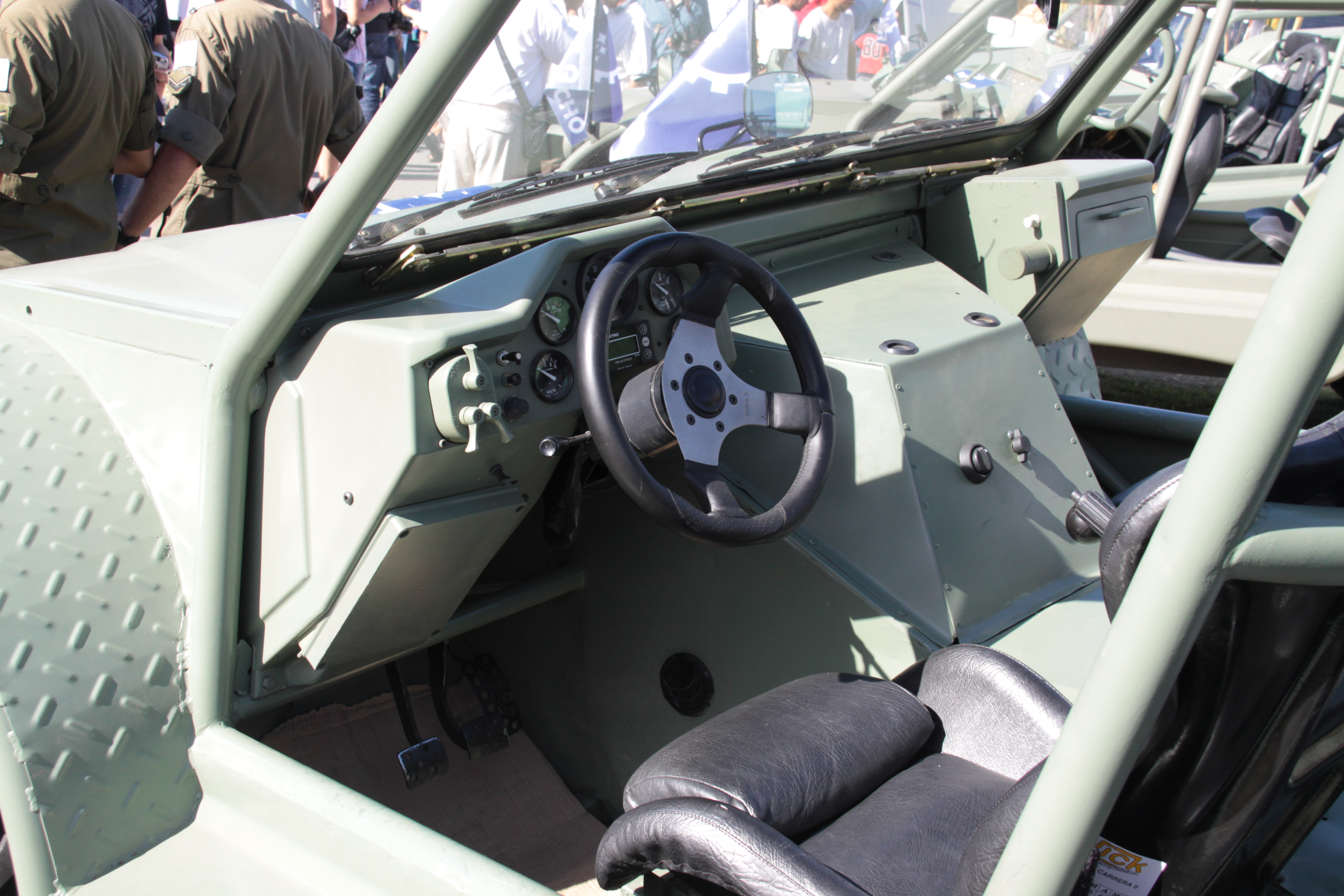
Dashboard

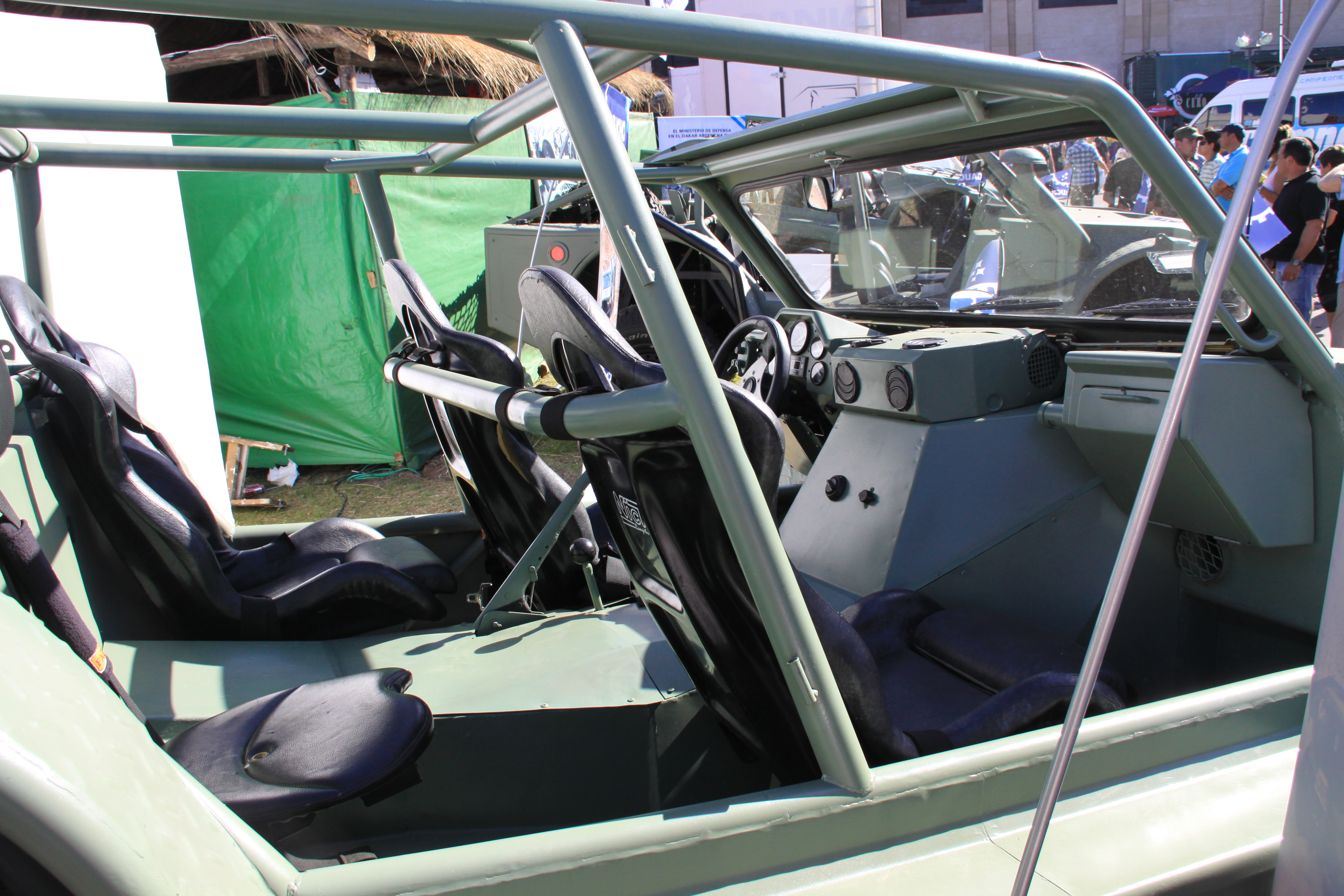
Interior

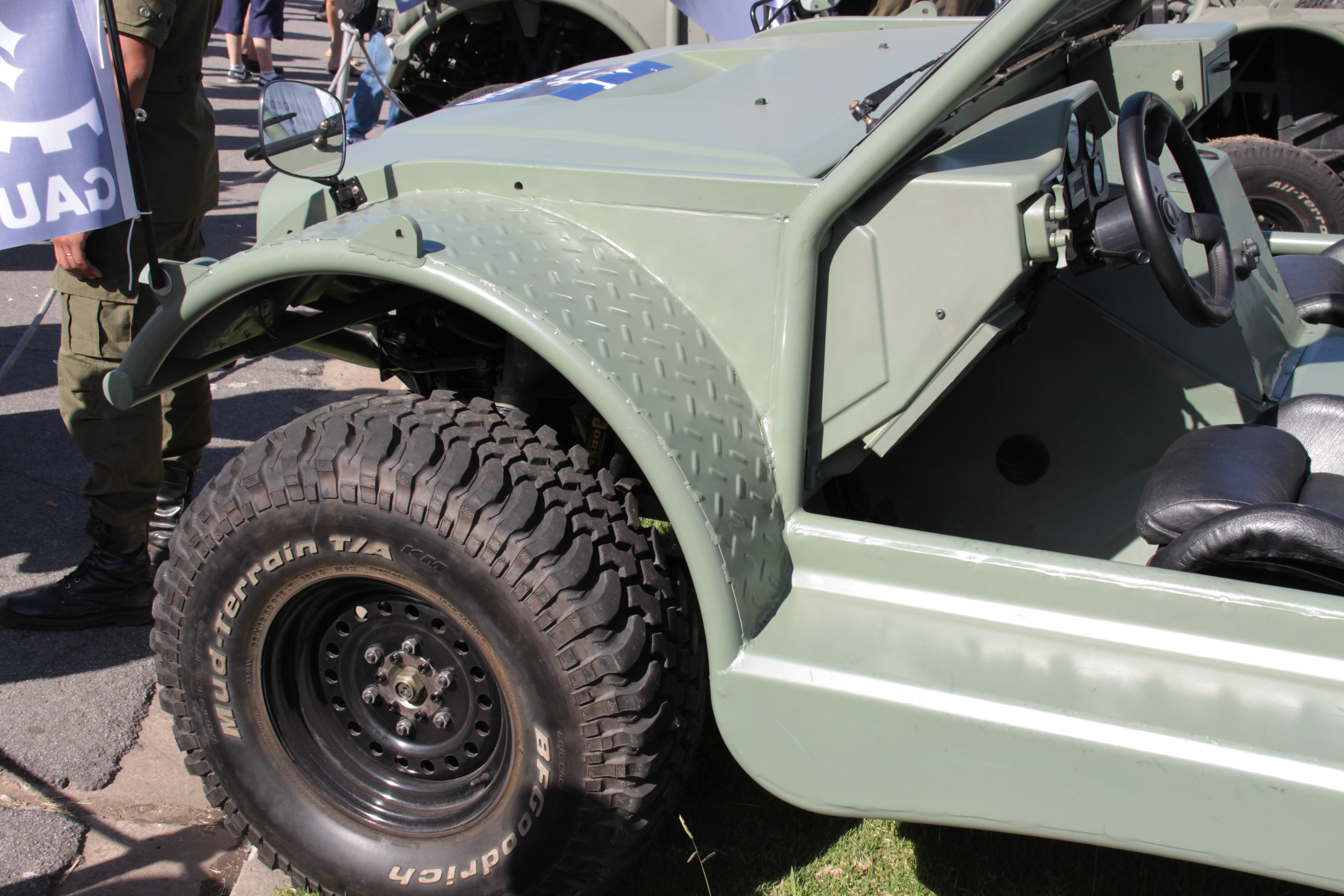
Front Wheel and tire

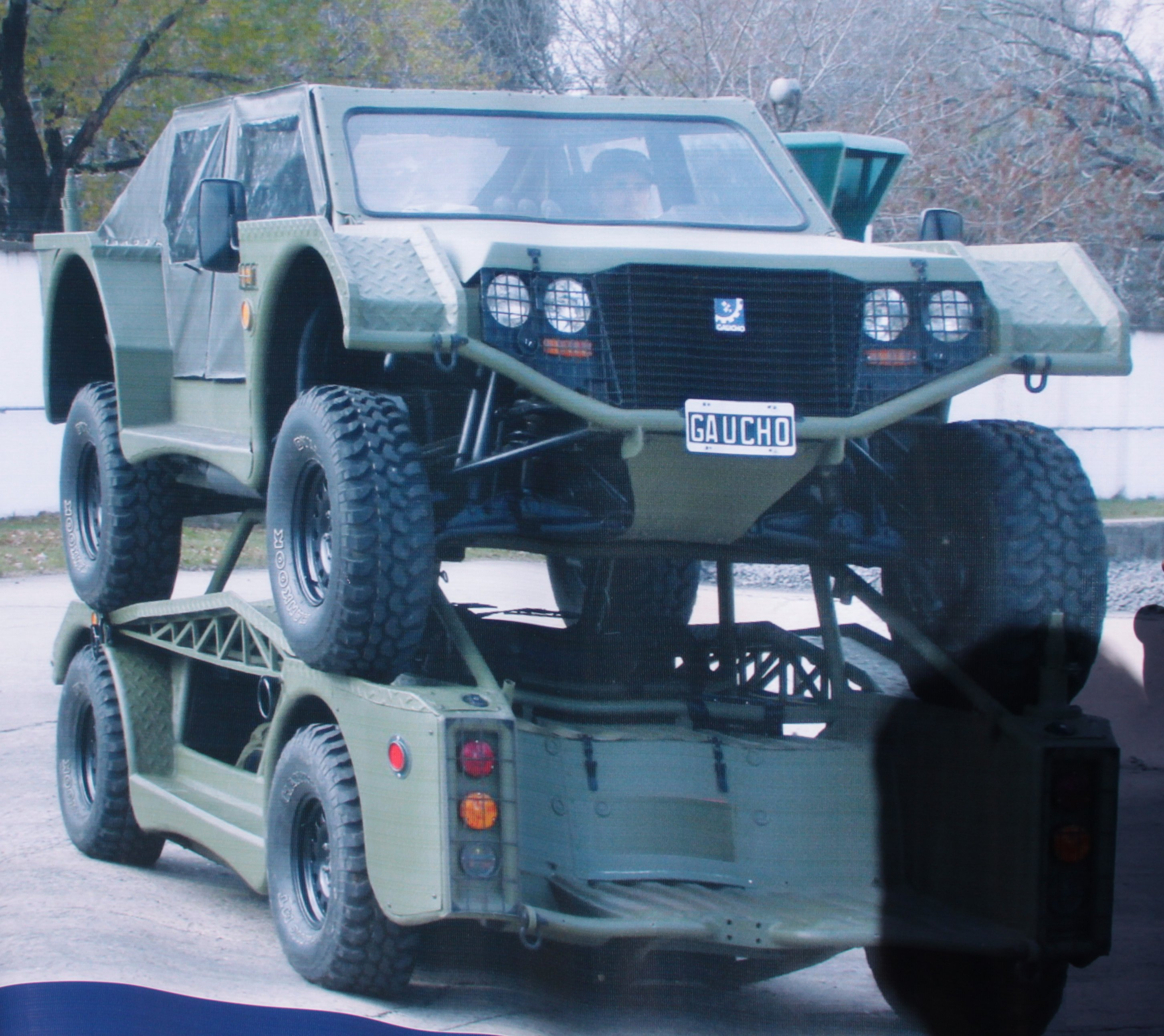
Stacked Gauchos for air transportation

== Users ==
- 28 (Argentina) Argentine Army - These vehicles have participated in various Argentine Armed Forces parades, as a symbol of the military industry. They are part of the equipment of southern units of the XI Mechanized Brigade, them being the 24 Mechanized Infantry Regiment and the 11th Armored Cavalry Exploration Squadron. It was used in the operating SOL 2010 -2011.
- (Brazil) Brazilian Army

== See also ==
- Agrale Marruá – (Brazil)
- Lamborghini Cheetah – (Italy)
- Ñandú – (Argentina)
- P6 ATAV – (Indonesia)
- Willys FAMAE Corvo – (Chile)
