= P6 ATAV =

Indonesian light attack vehicle

All-Terrain Assault Vehicle
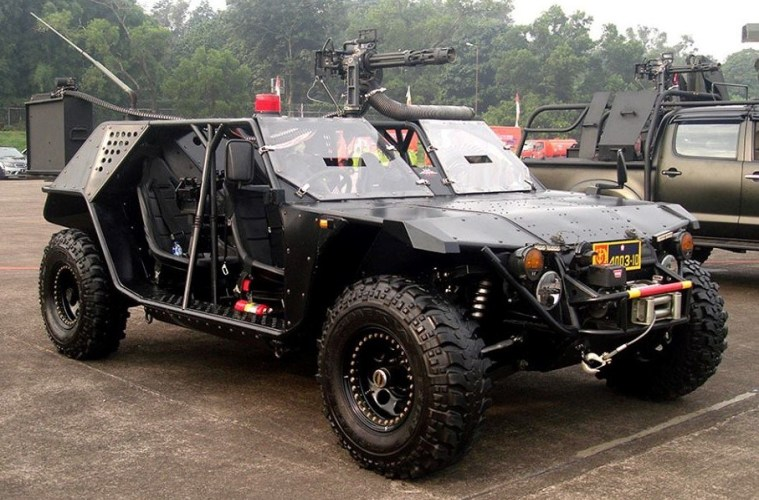
- P6 ATAV at TNI anniversary 2017
- Type: Light assault vehicle
- Place of origin: Indonesia

Service history
- In service: 2016 – present

Production history
- Designer: PT Sentra Surya Ekajaya and FAD Works
- Manufacturer: PT Sentra Surya Ekajaya
- Produced: 2016 – present
- Variants: Unarmoured (V1 and V2); Armoured (V3)

Specifications
- Mass: 2.965 tons empty, 3.365 tons combat weight (armored version)
- Length: 4.65 m
- Width: 2.26 m
- Height: 1.58 m
- Passengers: 4 passengers
- Armor: Aluminium, steel
- Engine: 4 Cylinder Turbo Charge Aftercooled 2,800 cc engine 161 bhp at 3,600 rpm
- Power/weight: 56 HP/ton
- Fuel capacity: 120 litres
- Operational range: 500 km
- Maximum speed: 120 km/h

P6 ATAV is an Indonesian Light Assault Vehicle, manufactured by PT Sentra Surya Ekayaja (SSE Defence). It made first public appearance in Indo Defence 2016. It is classified as rantis (kendaraan taktis — tactical vehicle) by Indonesian military.

== Design ==
P6 ATAV is manufactured by SSE Defence, the same company that manufactured P2 Pakci, P2 Commando, and P3 Cheetah. In general shape, P6 is similar to P3, but with wider and shorter body. P6 uses tubular frame and “open” body design without door and protective glass. It is constructed from high grade steel material and dual aluminium. Foreign vehicles that uses this body design is Light Strike Vehicle (Singapore) and General Dynamics Flyer.

P6 has 3 points for mounting weapons, preferably 7.62 mm MGs. The mounting is at the top of the vehicle, passenger left and passenger right side of the vehicle. In the future, it can be used to mount anti-tank missile, surface-to-air missile, and minigun. The P6 ATAV only has light armor protection (aluminium) to ensure its lightweight and agility.

P6 ATAV V3 is a fully armoured variant with STANAG level 1 standard, with bullet-proof glass and runflat tires. Two units can be embarked in the C-130 Hercules. P6 ATAV V3 is equipped with Reutech RCWS with 7.62 mm or 12.7 mm guns, and Metravib PILAR gunshot detection system.

== Users ==
- (Indonesia) Indonesian National Armed Forces : Used by Kopassus and Paskhas. 26 units for Indonesian army is delivered on 27 September 2021.

== Gallery ==
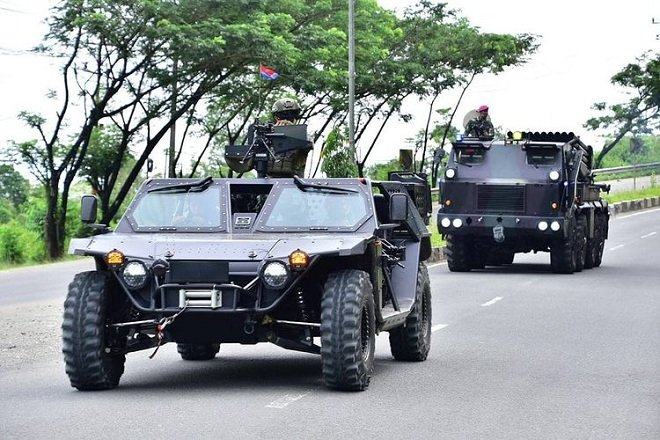
P6 ATAV of Indonesian marines.

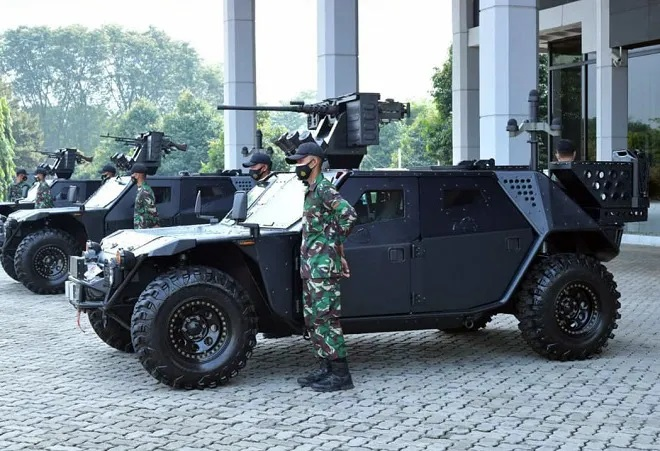
P6 ATAV V3, the armored version.

== See also ==
- Light Strike Vehicle – (Singapore)
- General Dynamics Flyer – (United States)
- VLEGA Gaucho – (Argentina)
