= Chivunk =

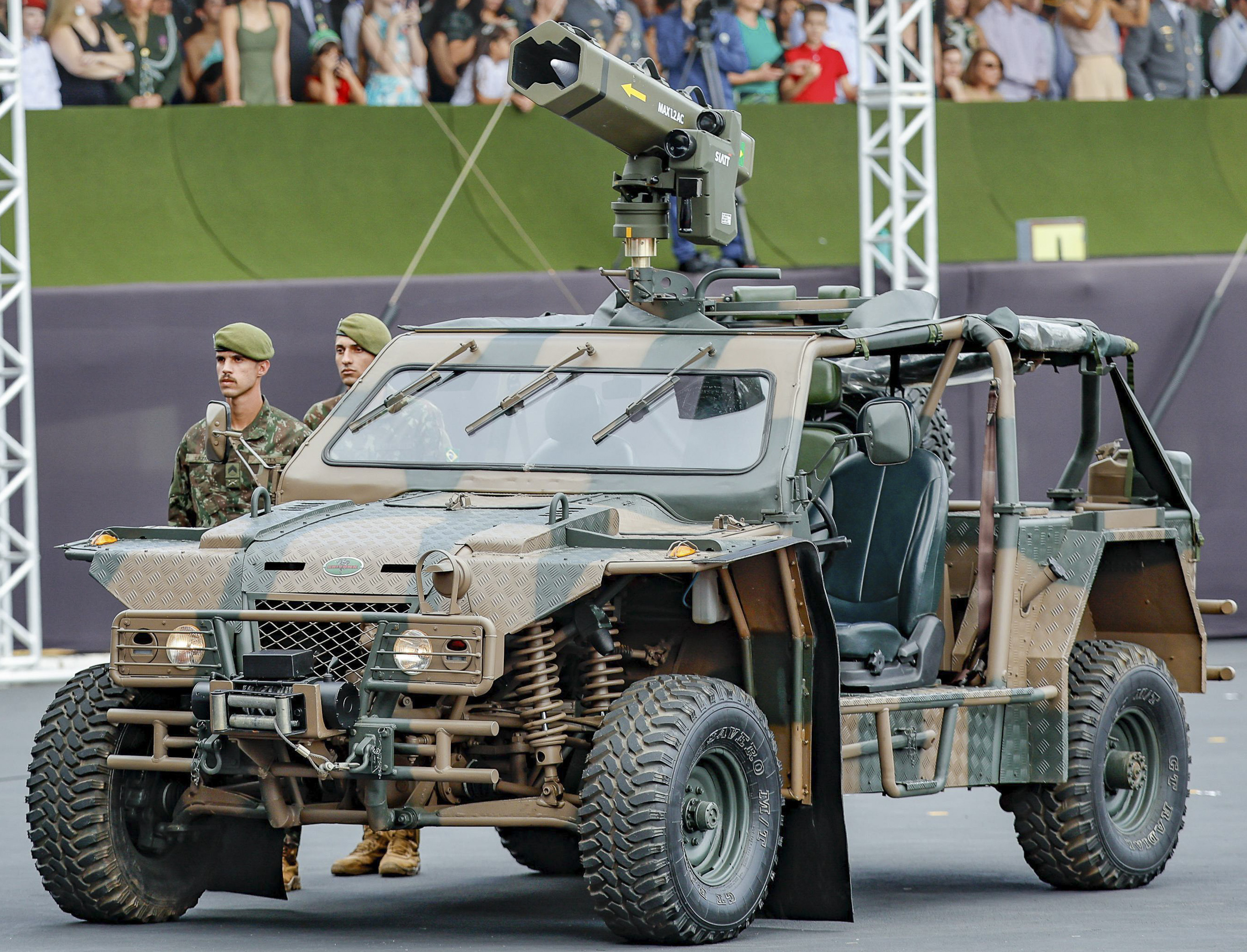
- Type: Air transportable, wheeled all-terrain light vehicle
- Place of origin: Brazil

Production history
- Manufacturer: Colombus

Specifications
- Crew: 3
- Engine: diesel 135hp
- Payload capacity: 500 kg
- Suspension: 4x4
- Maximum speed: 120 km/h

The Chivunk, also known as VLEGA Chivunk (port.: Viatura Leve de Emprego Geral Aerotransportável, en: air transportable general purpose light vehicle) is a Brazilian fast attack vehicle used by the Brazilian Army Rapid Action Troops.

== Development ==
The Chivunk was preceded by a joint program by Argentina and Brazil as the VLEGA Gaucho until 2011.

== Design ==
The Chivunk uses diamond plate surfacing and a built-in roll cage for field ruggedness and durability. It has multipurpose roles such as transport, medevac, reconnaissance and can be air dropped by parachute. Around 2-4 vehicles can be air transported in a C-130 Hercules and 4-7 vehicles in an Embraer C-390. Chivunk vehicles can be stored by stacking above each other. It can also be armed with a 120mm Mortar, AT4 launcher and FN MAG 7.62mm GPMG.

== See also ==
- FMC XR311 – (United States)
- VLEGA Gaucho – (Argentina)
- P6 ATAV – (Indonesia)
- Agrale Marruá – (Brazil)
