= Ground Mobility Vehicle =

Ground Mobility Vehicle may refer to:

- M1297 Army Ground Mobility Vehicle, a U.S. Army truck program, formerly called the Ultra Light Combat Vehicle (ULCV)
- Ground Mobility Vehicle (USSOCOM), a Humvee-based light utility vehicle used by SOCOM
- M1288 GMV 1.1, a General Dynamics Flyer-based vehicle used by SOCOM
