= Storm Search and Rescue Tactical Vehicle =

HDT Global Storm SRTV
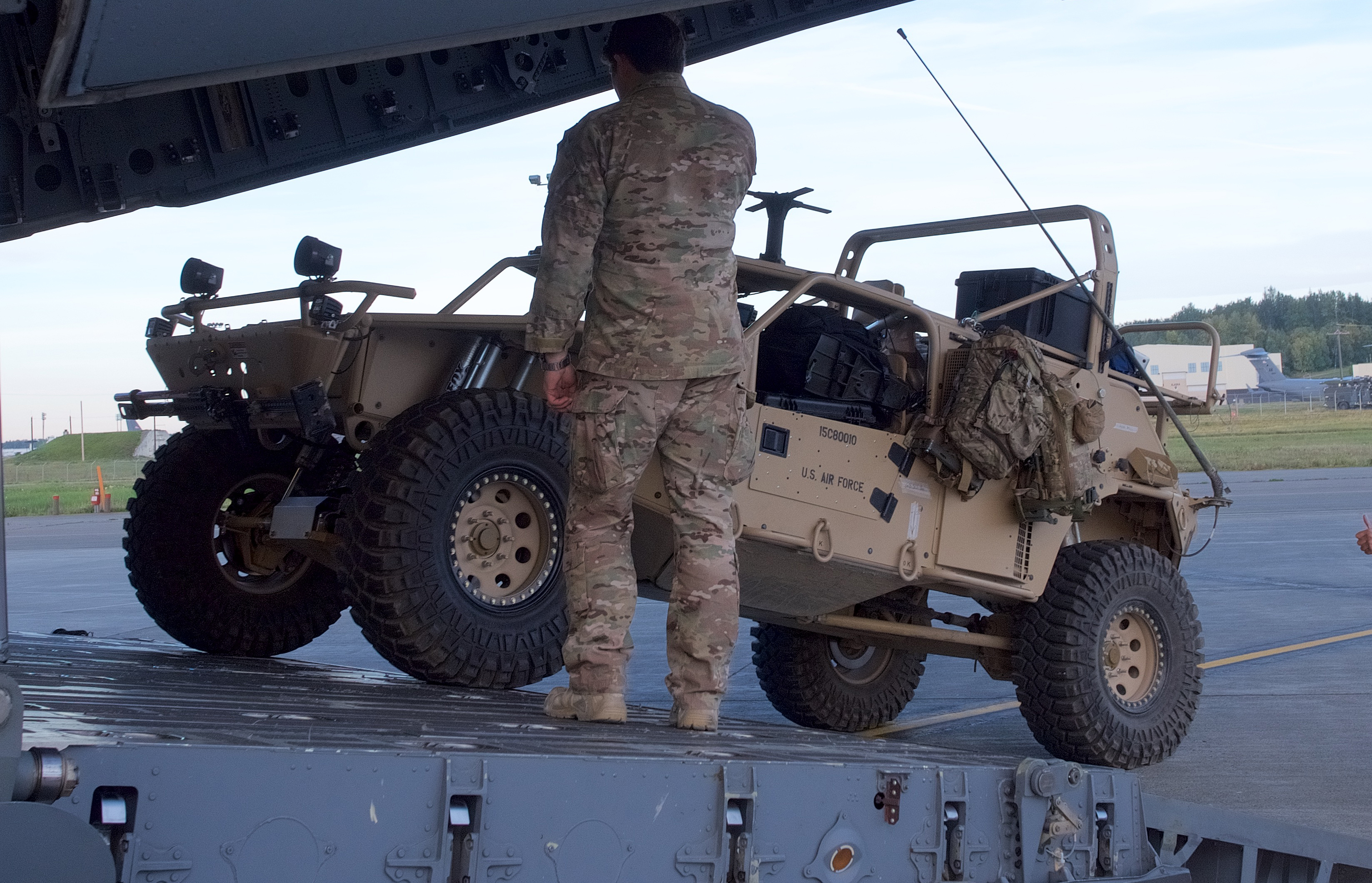
- Type: Special operations vehicle
- Place of origin: United States

Service history
- Used by: United States

Production history
- Manufacturer: HDT Global Inc. formerly Hunter Defence Technologies Inc.
- Produced: August 2013 (test vehicle): Geneva, Ohio (HDT Global)

Specifications
- Mass: 1,960 kg (4,320 lb), 3,651 kg (8,050 lb) (GVWR)
- Length: 3,302 mm (130 in)
- Width: 2,032 mm (80 in)
- Height: 1,676 mm (66 in)
- Crew: 6 (Combat Rescue Officer (CRO), Pararescue (PJ), SERE careerfields)
- Passengers: 3 patients/survivors
- Engine: GM LSX series engine (whipple supercharged) (gasoline, 87 Octane or higher, diesel, JP-8); 430 hp
- Payload capacity: 1,692 kg (3,730 lb)
- Transmission: 5 Speed Auto with Reverse (4WD)
- Suspension: long travel suspension
- Ground clearance: 457 mm (18 in)
- Operational range: 563 km (350 mi)
- Maximum speed: 161 km/h (100 mph)
- Guidance system: Garmin Digital Navigation System

The Storm Search and Rescue Tactical Vehicle (SRTV) is an all-terrain light military vehicle developed by the United States. It was the winner of the Guardian Angel Air-Deployable Rescue Vehicle (GAARV) competition awarded by the Air Force Life Cycle Management Center (AFLCMC). The competition was named for the pararescuemen and combat rescue officers known as the "Guardian Angel Weapon System." The Storm SRTV is to be used by the United States Air Force Pararescue.

== History ==
In 2004, BC Customs (BCC) designed the SRTV-3 for USAF Guardian Angel Forces and fielded it in 2007. The SRTV was included in the Air National Guard's (ANG) FY09 Weapons Systems Modernization Requirements documents specifically for Guardian Angel use. BCC worked with the ANG on Airdrop and multiple MDS (aircraft type) ITV certifications while awaiting the Air Combat Command (ACC) GAARV Solicitation process. In February 2012, the Aeronautical Systems Center (ASC) solicited proposals for a Guardian Angel Air Rescue Vehicle (GAARV). The purpose was to acquire an asset for air-deployable, surface rescue platform capable of maneuvering over adverse terrain in order to search for and recover Isolated Personnel (IP) and/or equipment, while also providing the capability of transporting the rescue team and the IP from an area of high threat to a defendable location for recovery by aircraft or self recovery to the final destination.

On September 25, 2012, HDT showed the Storm SRTV for the first time at the Modern Day Marine show. It addressed the requirements of the Air Force National Guard (ANG) Combat Search and Rescue (CSAR) units, and Special Operations Command (AFSOC). The SRTV can carry a tactical special team of six, plus three passengers on litters or four crew members and four patients. A team is composed of Combat Rescue Officer (CRO), Pararescue (PJ), and Survival, Evasion, Resistance and Escape (SERE) careerfields. On January 17, 2013, the USAF announced the selection of the HDT Storm SRTV as the GAARV. The Air Force Life Cycle Management Center (AFLCMC) awarded the company's Expeditionary Systems Group the Guardian Angel Air-Deployable Rescue Vehicle (GAARV) contract to produce the HDT Storm Search and Rescue Tactical Vehicles (SRTV).

On August 28, 2013, the first production vehicle was formally unveiled in Geneva, Ohio. The first two vehicles had started safety certification testing. On November 18, 2013, the USAF's 88th Test and Evaluations Squadron (TES) in Nellis Air Force Base, Nevada took delivery of the initial set of the GAARV for operational testing. Tests were scheduled to commence in March 2014 and will validate the vehicle's suitability and effectiveness for the Guardian Angel (GA) weapon system. The 88th TES is focused on maximising HH-60 Pave Hawk, HC-130 Hercules, and the GA weapon systems capability.

== Mission ==
Guardian Angel is an USAF non-aircraft weapon system program designed to execute USAF Combat Search and Rescue (CSAR) and Personnel Recovery (PR) across the full spectrum of military operations. Currently, Guardian Angels can reach casualties by parachute or helicopter. The new vehicle enables the team to be dropped off well outside the range of the enemy's anti-aircraft weapons to infiltrate, exfiltrate, and recover downed aircrew and personnel. It will expand the radius of operation of air-assets.

The vehicle would make the Guardian Angels susceptible to a different style of Search and Rescue (SAR) traps, where an enemy would try to purposely draw in rescue personnel. They may set up a different kind of trap with improvised explosive devices (IEDs) or vehicle-borne IEDs. Operating from a vehicle offers more avenues to get to a victim and get out, as well as transport all the gear necessary.

== Design ==
The Storm SRTV is based on an original design by BC Customs (BCC) of Utah, originally submitted for the Ground Mobility Vehicle System (GMV 1.1) competition hosted by SOCOM. It is in the tactical family of SXOR Mobility Vehicles of SXOR Motorsports. It is a highly mobile 2-door off-roading pickup truck design with all-wheel-drive. The light-weight tactical vehicle has a high performance mid-engine for maximum stability with 430 horsepower and 425 lb-ft of torque. The SRTV can exceed double its curb weight in payload while performing missions. The engine will run using standard gasoline, 87 Octane or higher, diesel, and JP-8. The SRTV is constructed of MIL-STD aircraft tubing, minimizing weight, maximizing strength, and providing a skeletal base for multiple types of commercial off-the-shelf (COTS) ballistic and blast armoring. The vehicle utilizes identical components with multiple body configurations, hence, it provides multi-role configurations.

The SRTV is measured to be carried internally by the M/HC-130P/N/J, C-130/C-130J, KC-130J and C-17 fixed-wing aircraft as well as the CH-47 and CH-53 helicopters. It is too wide for the V-22. The V-22 compatible version can carry a team of three with two patients on litters in the roll protected cage. The vehicle can be delivered through various methods including Low Velocity Aerial Delivery (LAPS) or via Joint Precision Airdrop System (JPADS), guided parachutes, methods.

The SRTV has a range of up to 350 miles, and can operate in difficult environmental conditions, and including at 10,000 ft (3,048 m) above mean sea level. The vehicle can travel at a speed over 100 mph and climb vertical grades over 70 degrees, move on side slopes angles of over 60 degrees and climb vertical steps over three feet. It can turn on a 20' (6.1 m) diameter curb to curb. Maneuverability is enhanced with cutting brakes allowing U-turns on steep hills within the length and width of the vehicle, also allowing high speed J-turns. The vehicle provides rollover safety for all occupants without limiting mission operational performance. Storm can carry up to three litters inside the rollover protection frame, without modifications, while still maintaining 360° of weapon field of fire.

== Weapons ==
There are weapons mount options: Fore and aft crew-served weapon mounts, 360 degree turret with roll protection, and standard swing arm mounts. BCC has been working with Garwood Industries (GI) to integrate their M134 Minigun, FN Herstal to integrate their light Weapon Stations, and Military Systems Group (MSG) for multiple weapon stations.

== Variants ==
The BCC SRTV-5, nicknamed the “Warthog”, has an internal crew of three with options for up to two additional crew and two internal (roll protected) patients. BCC had fielded an SRTV-5 variant to the US Border Patrol special operations group BORSTAR.

The BCC SRTV-22 (Osprey) variant has an internal crew of three with options for two additional crew or two (roll protected) patients, but loses either one crew member or patient as required. The variant is designed to quickly load and unload from the V-22 with no major adjustments other than collapsing the roll protection. Additionally, it is less than 900 lbs per wheel, making it ideal for use as an Internally Transportable Vehicle (ITV) and can be ordered with the V-22 trailer.

== Non-military usage ==
In 2022, the Extreme E racing series began using two heavily modified Storm SRTVs as rescue vehicles for crashed drivers. Dubbed the "MDD-1" and "MDD-2", the vehicles' repurposing was performed by Extreme E team Chip Ganassi Racing and Whelen Engineering Company.

The SRTV-SXV-XL, an extended-cab variant produced by BC Customs, has competed in the Mint 400 and King of the Hammers.

== See also ==
- General Dynamics Flyer
- Growler (vehicle)
- Ultra Light Combat Vehicle
- SPECTRE light vehicle
