= GMV =

GMV may refer to:

- Gamo language
- GMV Innovating Solutions, a Spanish technology company
- GMV Nashville, an American record label
- GMV-6, now VTV, an Australian television station
- Great Malvern railway station, in England
- Greenwich Millennium Village, a residential area of London
- Grill Music Venue, a nightclub in Letterkenny, Ireland
- Gross merchandise volume
- Army Ground Mobility Vehicle, a vehicle project by the United States Army
- Ground Mobility Vehicle – (US)SOCOM program – specialized Humvees and GD Flyers used by U.S. Special Operations Forces
- Guaranteed minimum value
- Game Music Video
