= M1301 infantry squad vehicle =

M1301 Infantry Squad Vehicle
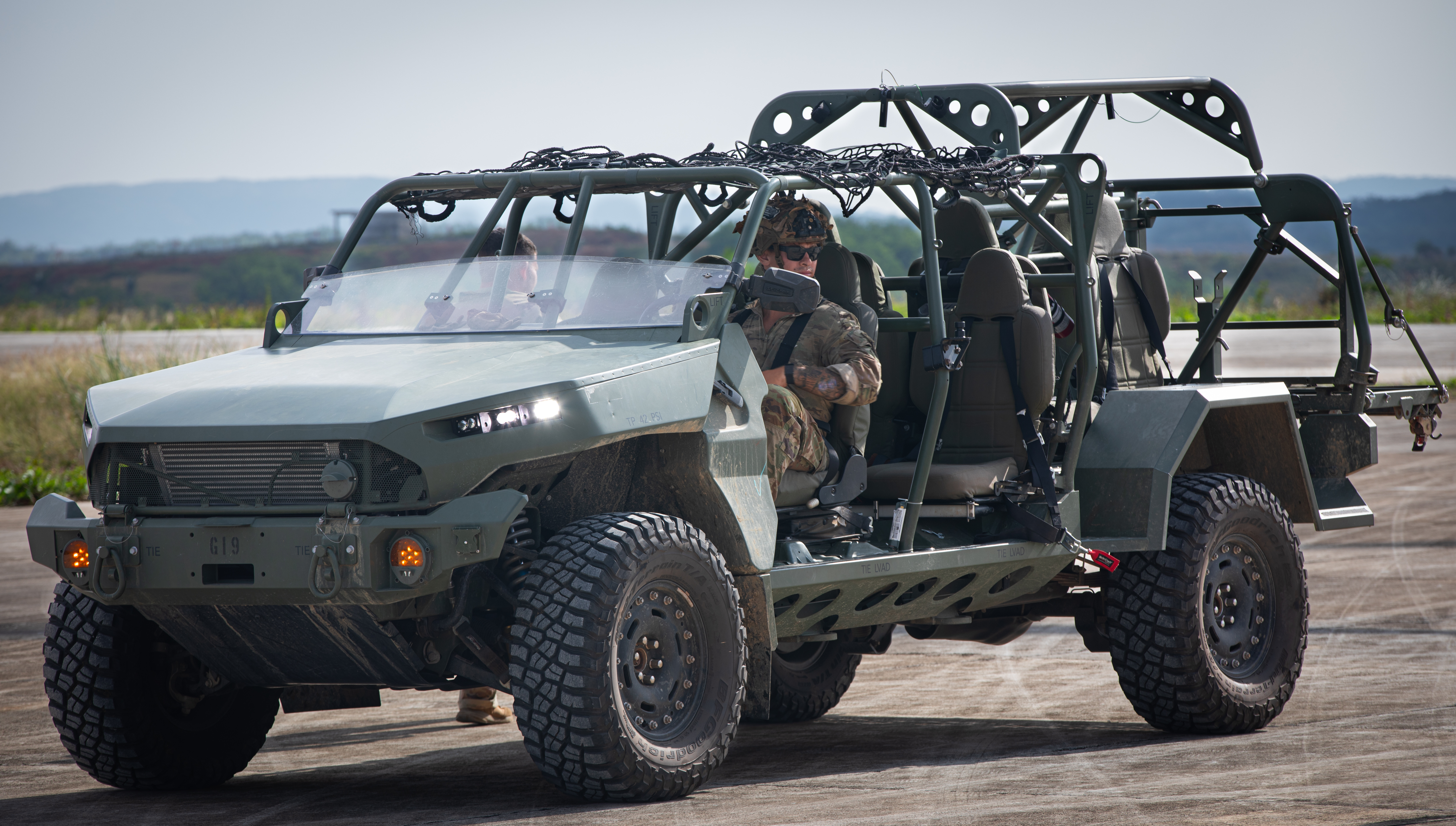
- GM Defense Infantry Squad Vehicle
- Type: Light utility vehicle
- Place of origin: United States

Service history
- In service: 2020–present

Production history
- Manufacturer: GM Defense; Ricardo plc Rod Hall Products; Hendrick Motorsports
- Produced: 2020–present

Specifications
- Mass: 4,930 lbs (2,236 kg)
- Crew: 9 occupants
- Engine: LWN 2.8 litres (170 cubic inches) turbo-diesel 275 horsepower (205 kW)
- Payload capacity: 3,200 pounds (1,500 kg)
- Transmission: 6L50 Six-speed automatic

The M1301 Infantry Squad Vehicle (ISV) is an air-transportable high-speed, light utility vehicle selected by the United States Army in 2020. It is based on the Chevrolet Colorado ZR2 platform. An ISV can carry nine infantrymen. Fielding began in 2021, along with initial operational test and evaluation (IOTE); 649 ISVs are to be allocated to 11 infantry brigade combat teams (IBCTs) by 2025. As of November 2025, 919 ISVs have been delivered to U.S. Army IBCTs and another 186 ISVs have been delivered to the 75th Ranger Regiment. According to the U.S. Army's budget for fiscal Year 2026, the U.S. Army has an Army Acquisition Objective (AAO) for 9,282 ISVs.

The Army will purchase 1,700 ISVs to augment the stop-gap M1297 Army Ground Mobility Vehicle, which is based on the General Dynamics Flyer 72.

== Development ==
The M1301 Infantry Squad Vehicle comprises the second phase of the Army Ground Mobility Vehicle program. The Army initiated the Ultra Light Combat Vehicle program beginning in 2014. The Army renamed this the Army Ground Mobility Vehicle in 2015. The Army never formalized a competitive bid process, but in the interim, opted to purchase a limited number of GMVs through SOCOM's Ground Mobility Vehicle 1.1 program. In its 2018 budget request, the Army split the GMV into two phases. The second phase, called the Infantry Squad Vehicle program, was initiated to acquire 1,700 additional vehicles; compared to 295 A-GMV.

In 2019, the U.S. Army awarded three ISV prototype contracts to the GM Defense/Ricardo plc consortium, the Oshkosh Defense/Flyer Defense LLC consortium and the Science Applications International Corporation (SAIC)/Polaris Inc. consortium.

Soldiers of the 101st Airborne Division driving the M1301 ISV

The operational requirements of the ISV were nine passengers, a payload of 3,200 pounds (1,500 kg), transportable by external sling load by a Sikorsky UH-60 Black Hawk helicopter, internal load/external lift by Boeing CH-47 Chinook helicopter, low-velocity air drop by Lockheed C-130 Hercules or Boeing C-17 Globemaster III transport aircraft and exceptional mobility over all terrains allowing Infantry Brigade Combat Teams to move with their equipment over difficult terrain.

The GM/Ricardo prototype was based on the Chevrolet Colorado ZR2 and uses 90% commercial off the shelf parts. The Oshkosh/Flyer prototype was based on the Flyer 72 Ground Mobility Vehicle 1.1 and the SAIC/Polaris prototype was based on the Polaris DAGOR.

Prototype trials took place at Aberdeen Proving Ground in November/December 2019 followed by further trials at Fort Bragg in January 2020.

== Design ==
The ISV is a doorless body-on-frame design, with steel and aluminum body panels. It is capable of seating 9 personnel (the size of a standard US Army rifle or weapons squad) in a 2/3/2/2 configuration within a simple roll-over protection structure. In addition to its occupants the ISV can store their rucksacks and sustainment items like water and ammunition. The ISV can be transported by the UH-60 Blackhawk via sling load, and internally carried in the CH-47 Chinook.

The ISV is powered by a Duramax 2.8L turbocharged direct-injection diesel I4 engine connected to a Hydra-Matic 6-speed automatic transmission and 2-speed transfer case. The braking system is power assisted and anti-lock, with all 4 wheels using disc brakes and a run-flat insert. The electrical system is 24V and has a standard NATO jumper cable connector (aka "slave cable"). The headlights can be used in a combat and blackout driving mode for night time convoy driving.

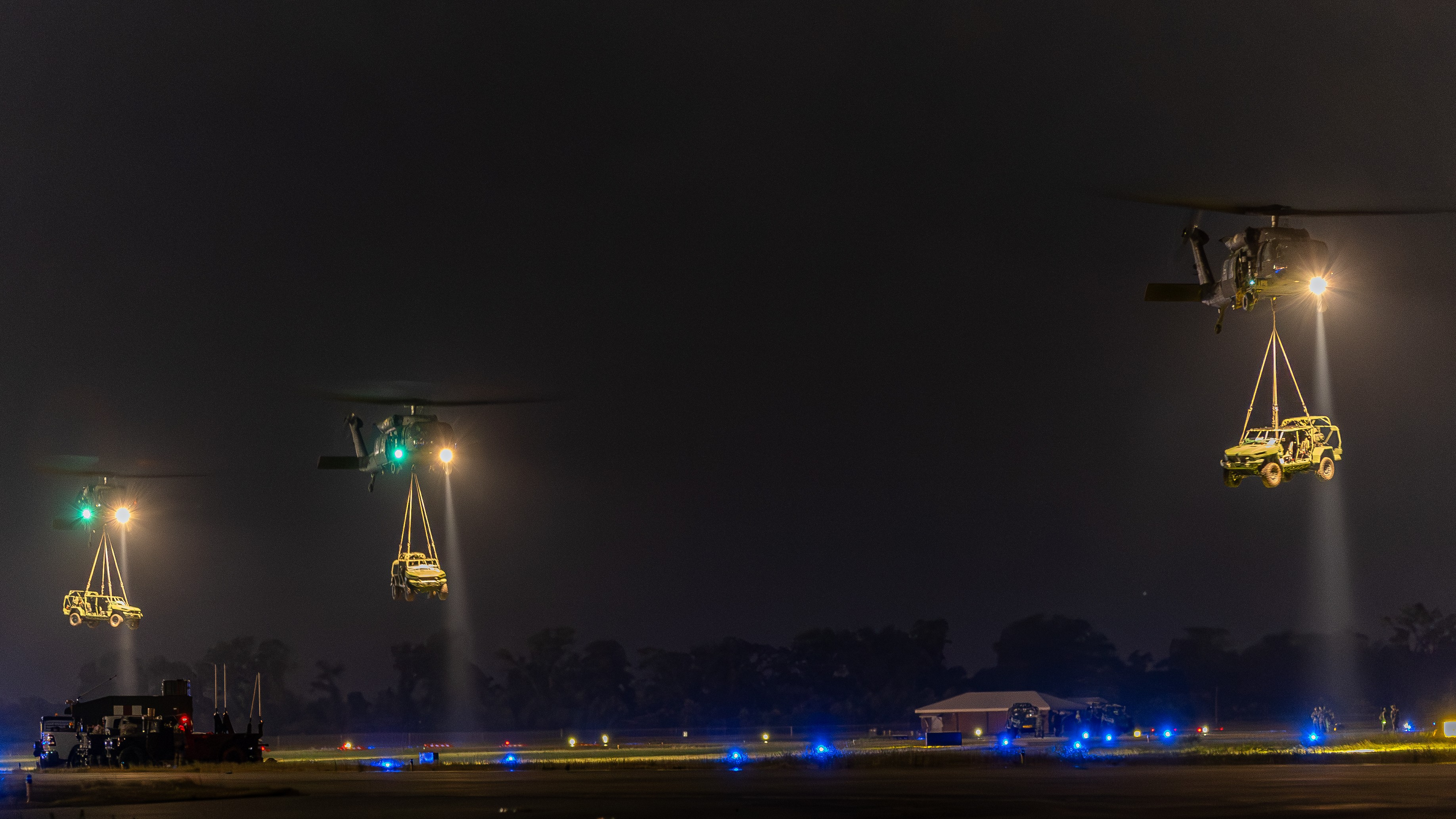
M1301 ISVs being sling-loaded by UH-60 Black Hawks

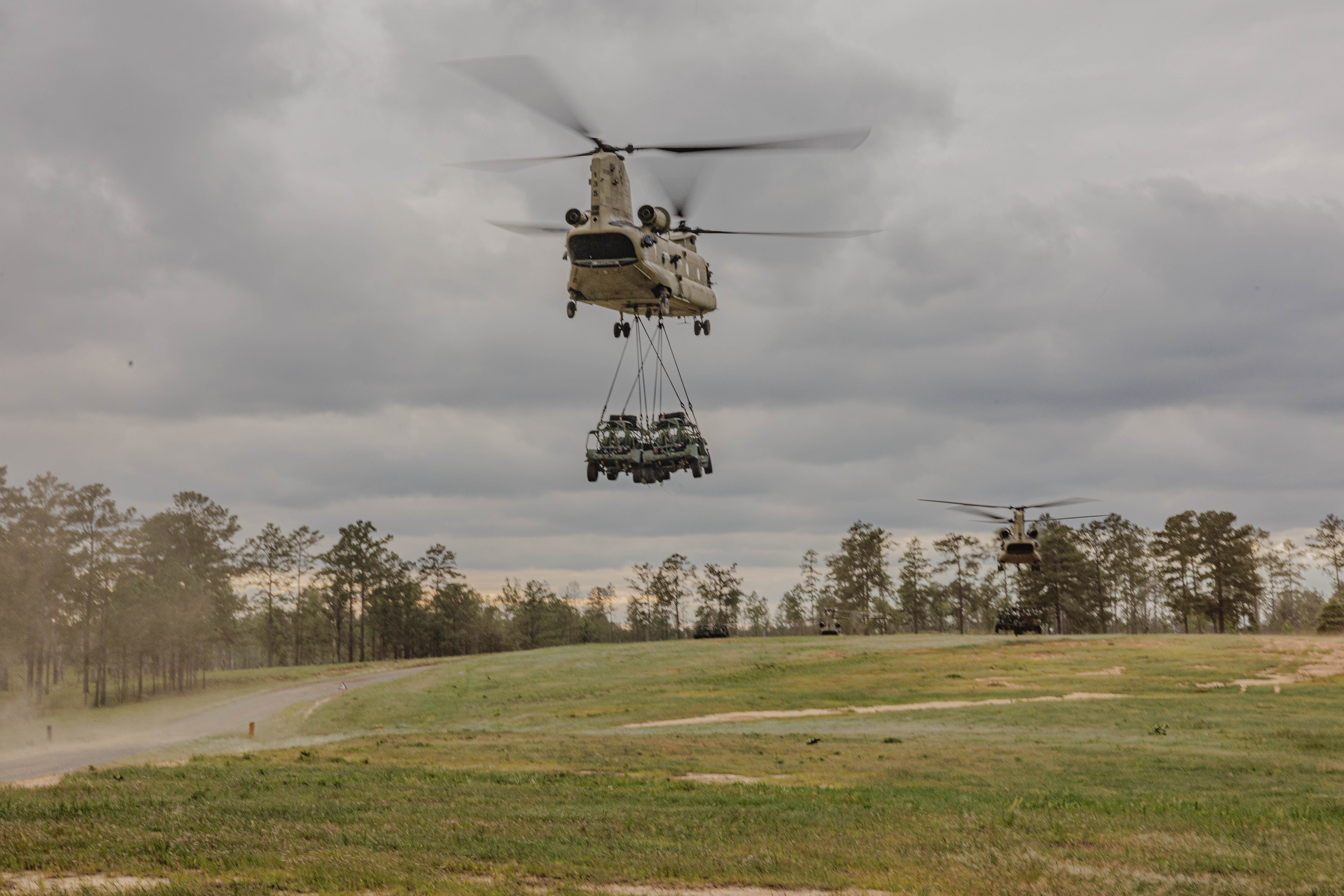
A CH-47 sling-loading two M1301 ISVs

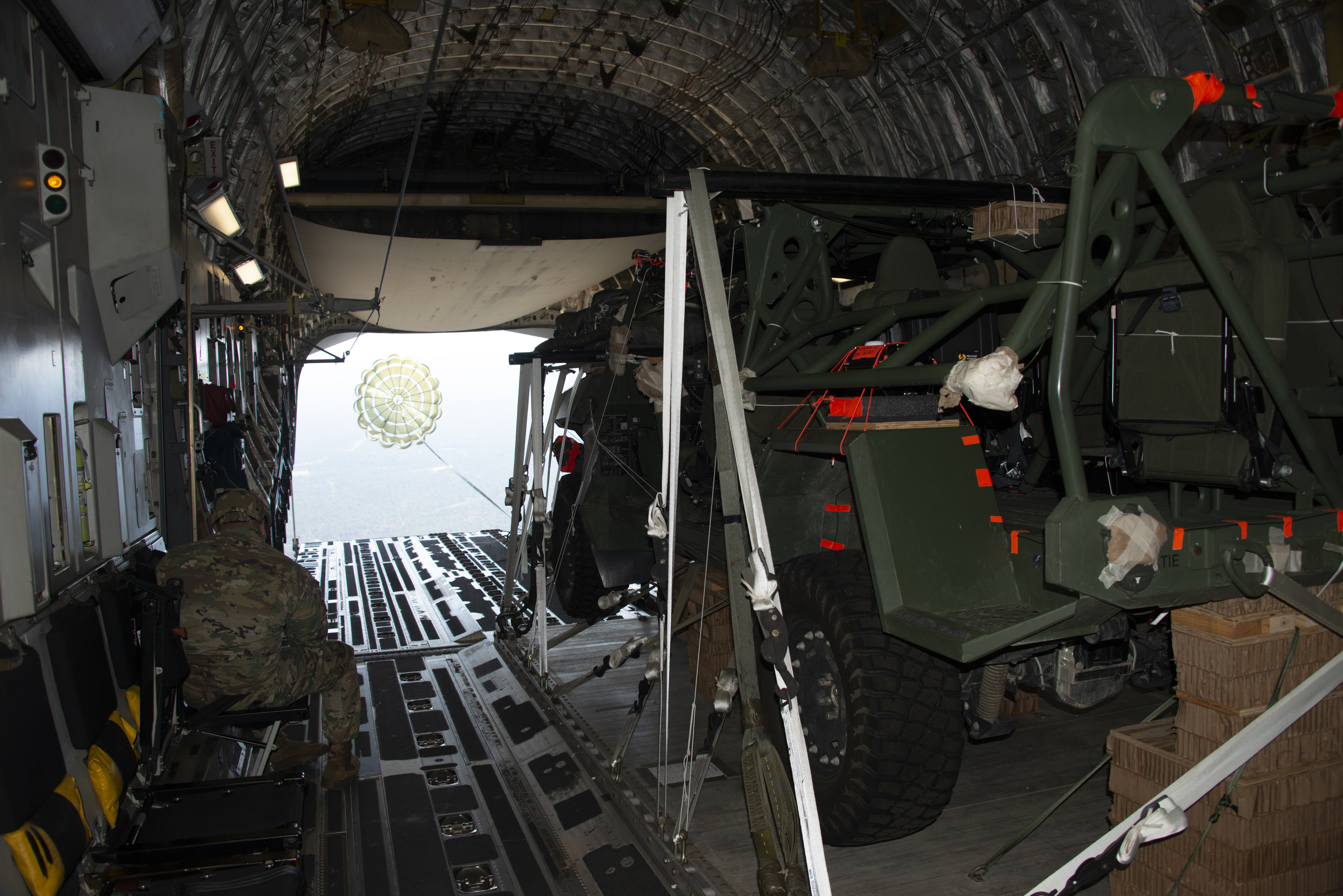
An M1301 ISV being airdropped out of a C-17

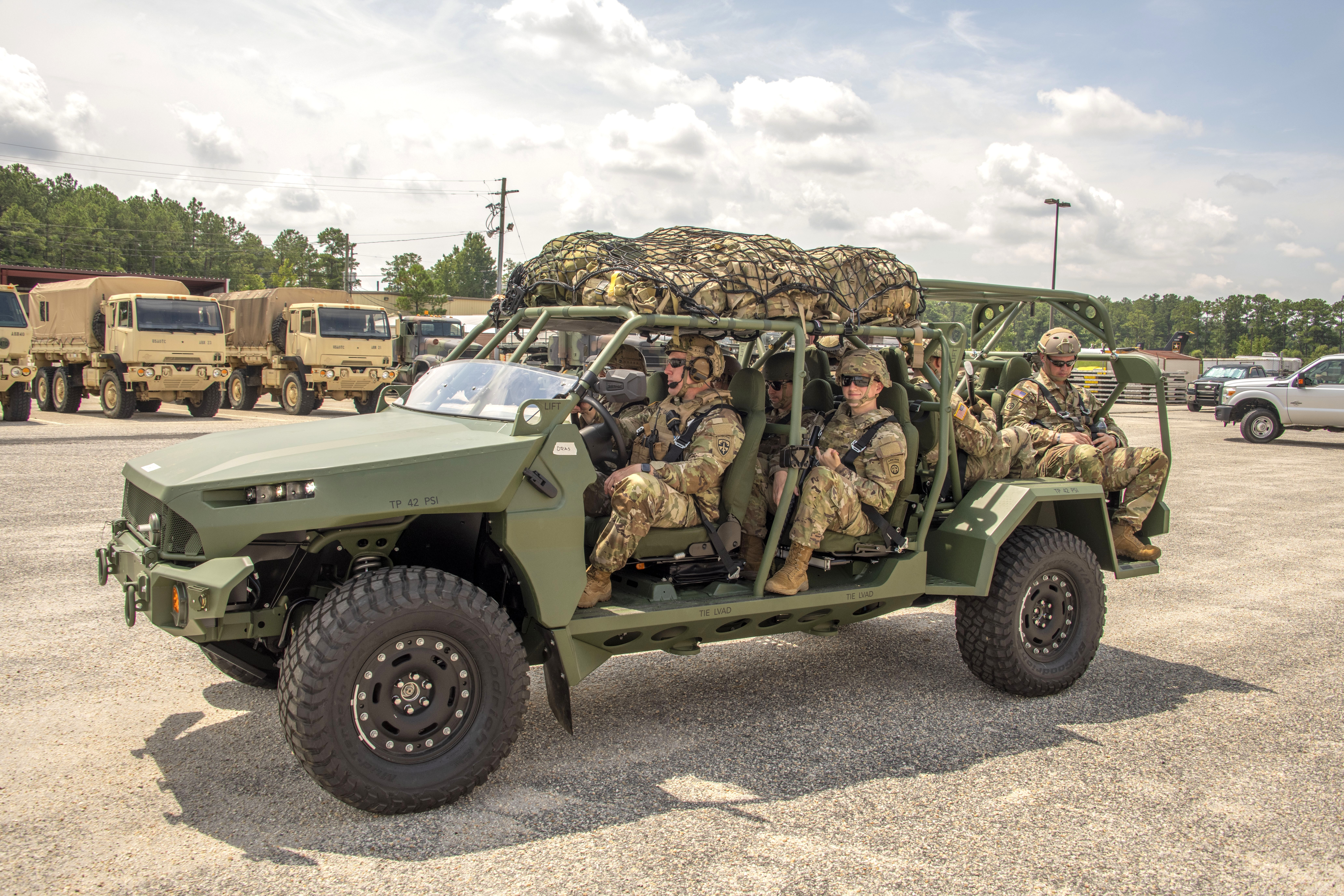
M1301 with nine paratroopers conducting 50-kilometer road test after parachute drop

== Variants ==
=== AMP-HEL ===
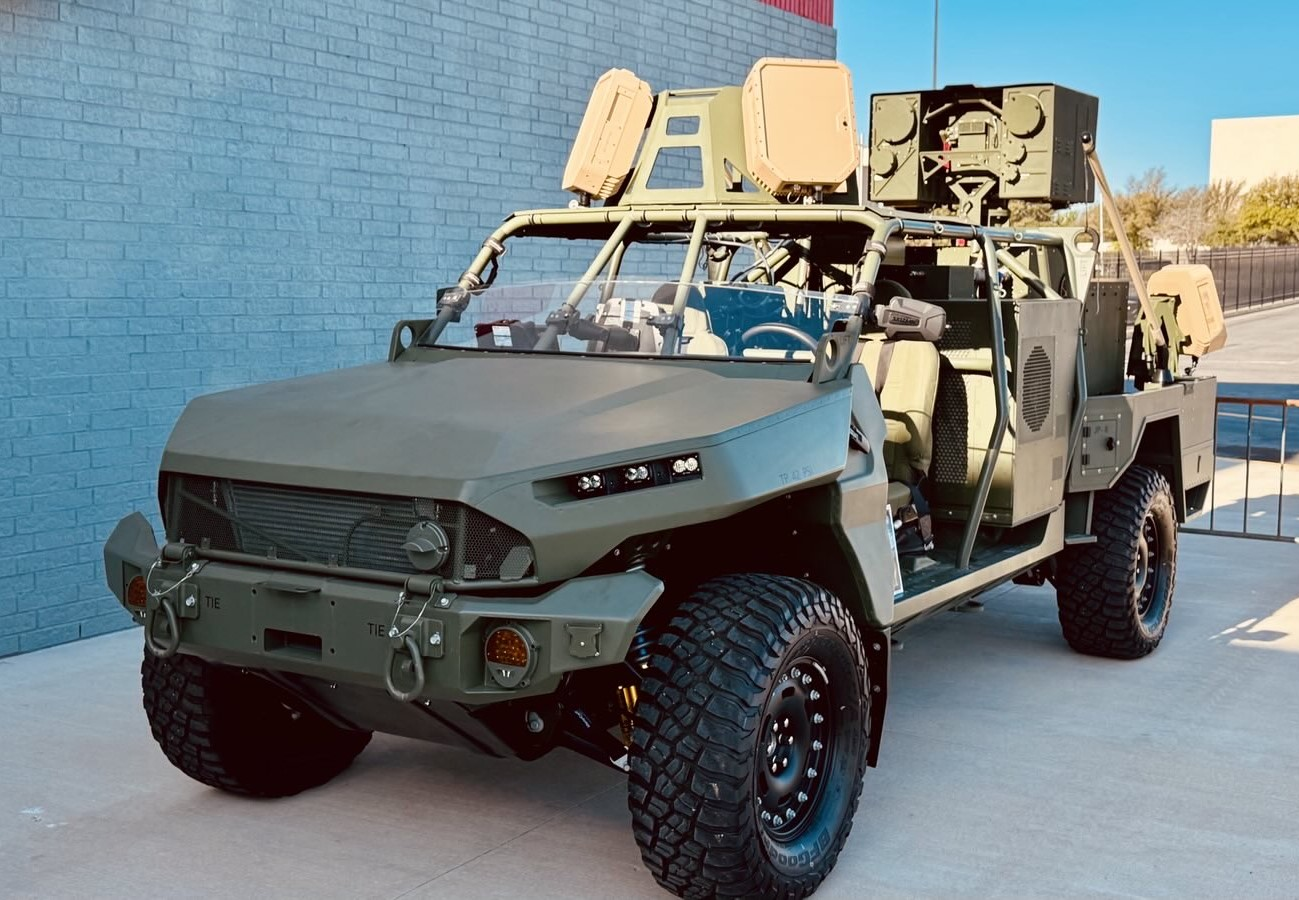
M1301 ISV equipped with a laser weapon system

In August 2022, the Army revealed it was developing a directed energy weapon to protect IBCTs from small drones. The program is called the Army Multipurpose High Energy Laser (AMP-HEL) and plans to integrate a 20 kW laser onto an ISV in 2023, which is enough power to defend against group one and two UAVs.

=== TEWS-I ===
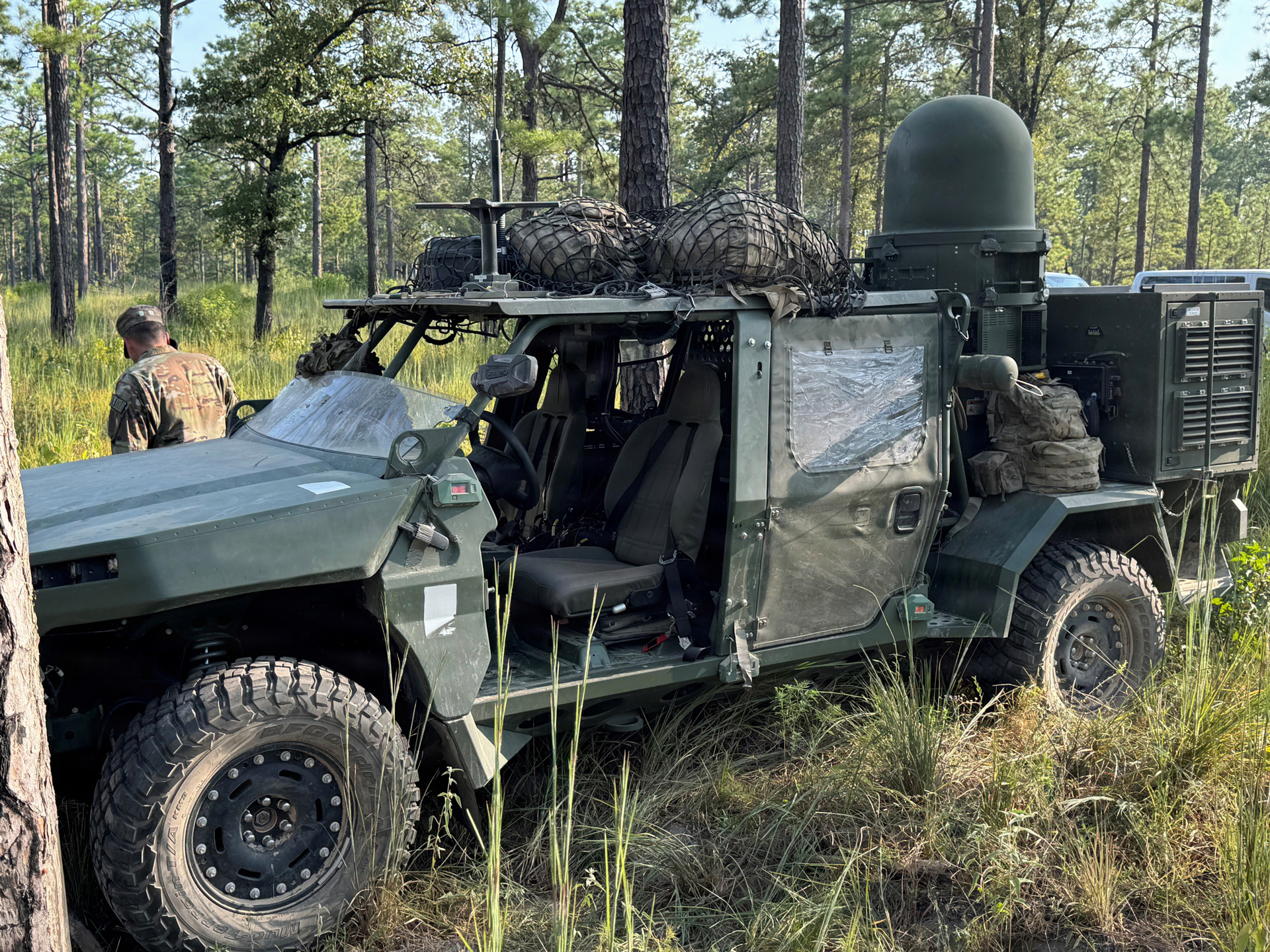
Tactical Electronic Warfare System-Infantry (TEWS-I)

The Tactical Electronic Warfare System Infantry (TEWS-I) is a tactical electronic warfare and signals intelligence variant of the M1301 Infantry Squad Vehicle designed for Infantry Brigade Combat Team formations. TEWS-I is an all-weather, 24-hour mounted capability that enables commanders to detect, locate, and identify enemy radio frequency emitters and apply non-lethal electronic effects to disrupt, deny, or degrade adversary communications and coordination. Each system consists of an integrated suite of radio frequency antennas, receivers, and processors mounted on the M1301 platform, allowing operations while stationary or on the move and supporting rapid maneuver in contested environments. TEWS-I conducts electronic warfare support using shared hardware and software, including machine learning–based signal recognition and integrated signal detectors, and employs GPS and tactical radio communications to provide near-real-time situational awareness to soldiers in the field. The system also features an open architecture design with multi-communications options, electronic support and electronic attack targeting, integration with electronic warfare planning tools, and expanded signals-of-interest detection.

=== ISV-U ===
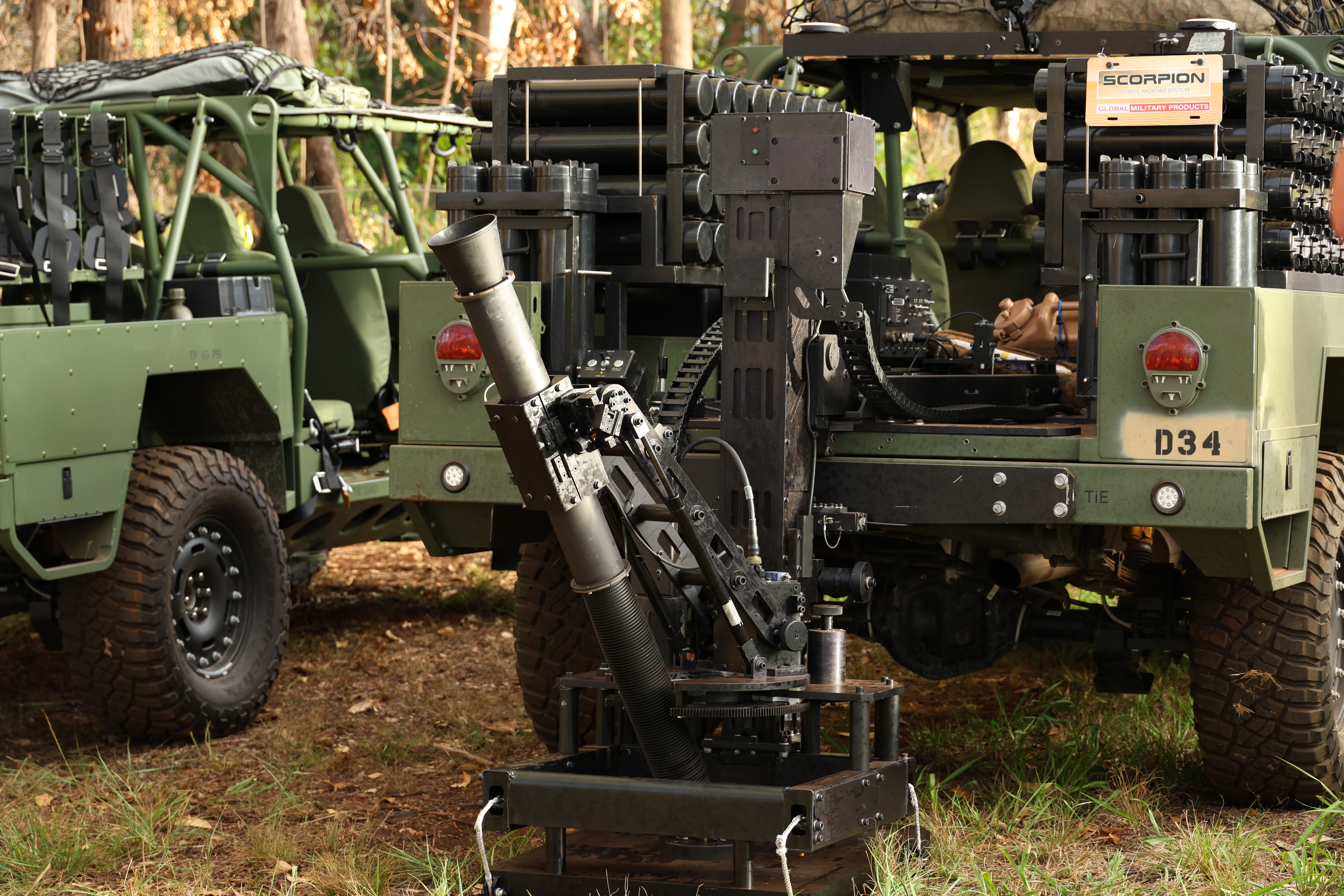
ISV-U with a Scorpion Mortar System

In 2025, the U.S. Army announced the purchase of the Infantry Squad Vehicle–Utility (ISV-U), with plans to acquire 1,275 ISV-U vehicles in fiscal year 2026. The ISV-U is a five-seat variant of the ISV featuring a medium-sized rear cargo bed that can be adapted for a broad range of mission profiles, including logistics, fire support, command and control, electronic warfare, counter-unmanned aircraft systems, and reconnaissance.

In October 2025, the U.S. Army’s 2nd Battalion, 35th Infantry Regiment tested the Scorpion Mortar system mounted on an ISV-U. Each ISV-U carrying the Scorpion Mortar system is equipped with an M252 81mm mortar and 72 mortar rounds. The system features an advanced digital fire control system, enabling rapid and accurate targeting and re-aiming with minimal crew intervention. Additionally, the ISV-U can be internally transported by a CH-47 Chinook helicopter, allowing for rapid deployment in remote and austere environments. The Scorpion mortar system is manufactured by the Spanish NTGS, and is known locally as the Alakran.

The US Marine Corps Special Operations Command is the beneficiary of a contract signed in February 2026 for the IISV equipped with the Scorpion.

== Operational use ==
The M1301 ISV was first used by 2nd Brigade, 101st Airborne Division in a Defense Support of Civil Authorities mission to provide aid to Hurricane Helene victims in eastern Tennessee and western North Carolina in October 2024. ISVs were transported via internal load in CH-47 Chinook helicopters and via a 350 mile (563 km) convoy from Fort Campbell, KY to Asheville, NC.

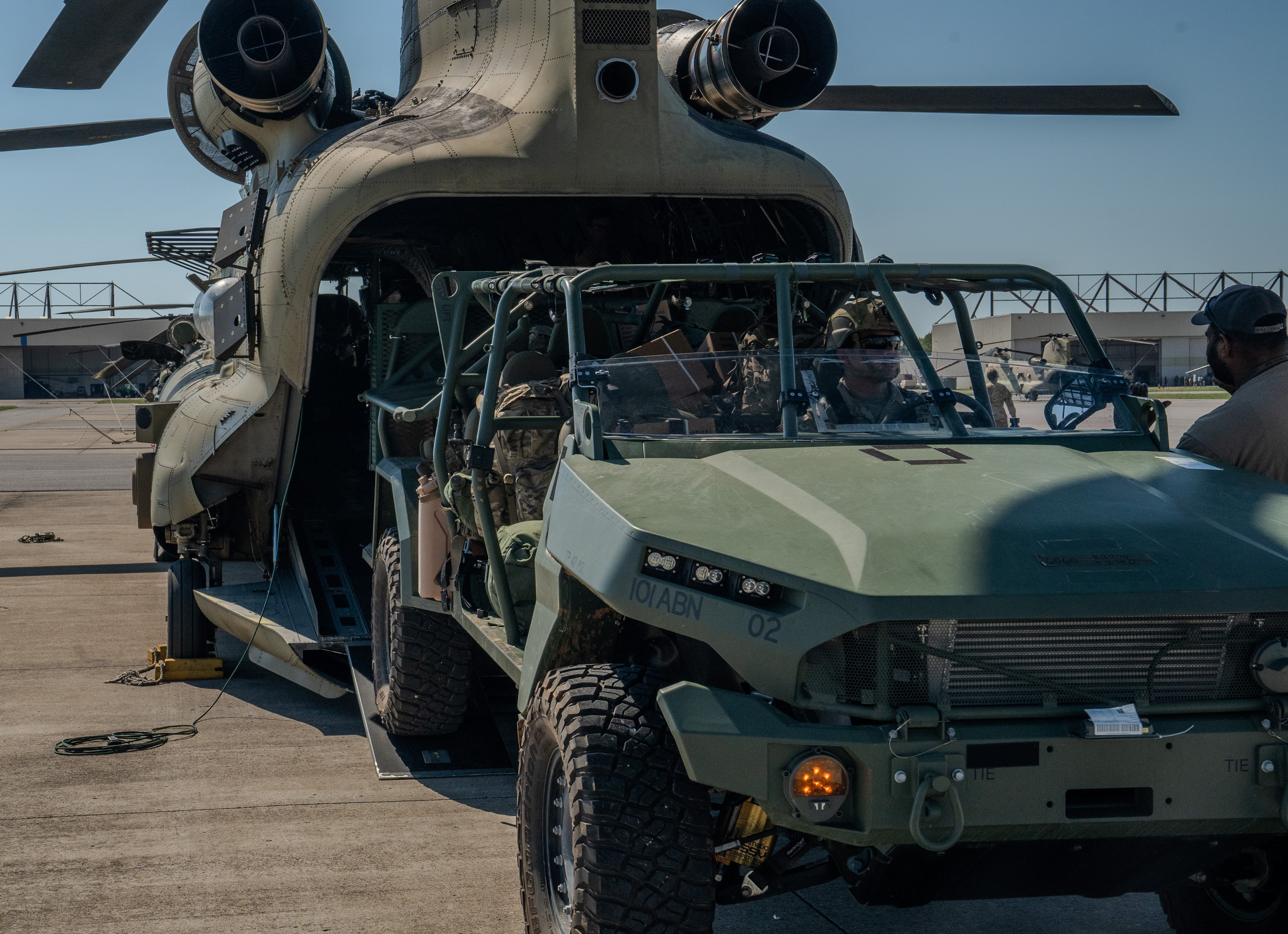
101st Airborne Division soldiers load an ISV into a CH-47 Chinook in preparation for an air lift to western North Carolina to provide aid to Hurricane Helene victims.

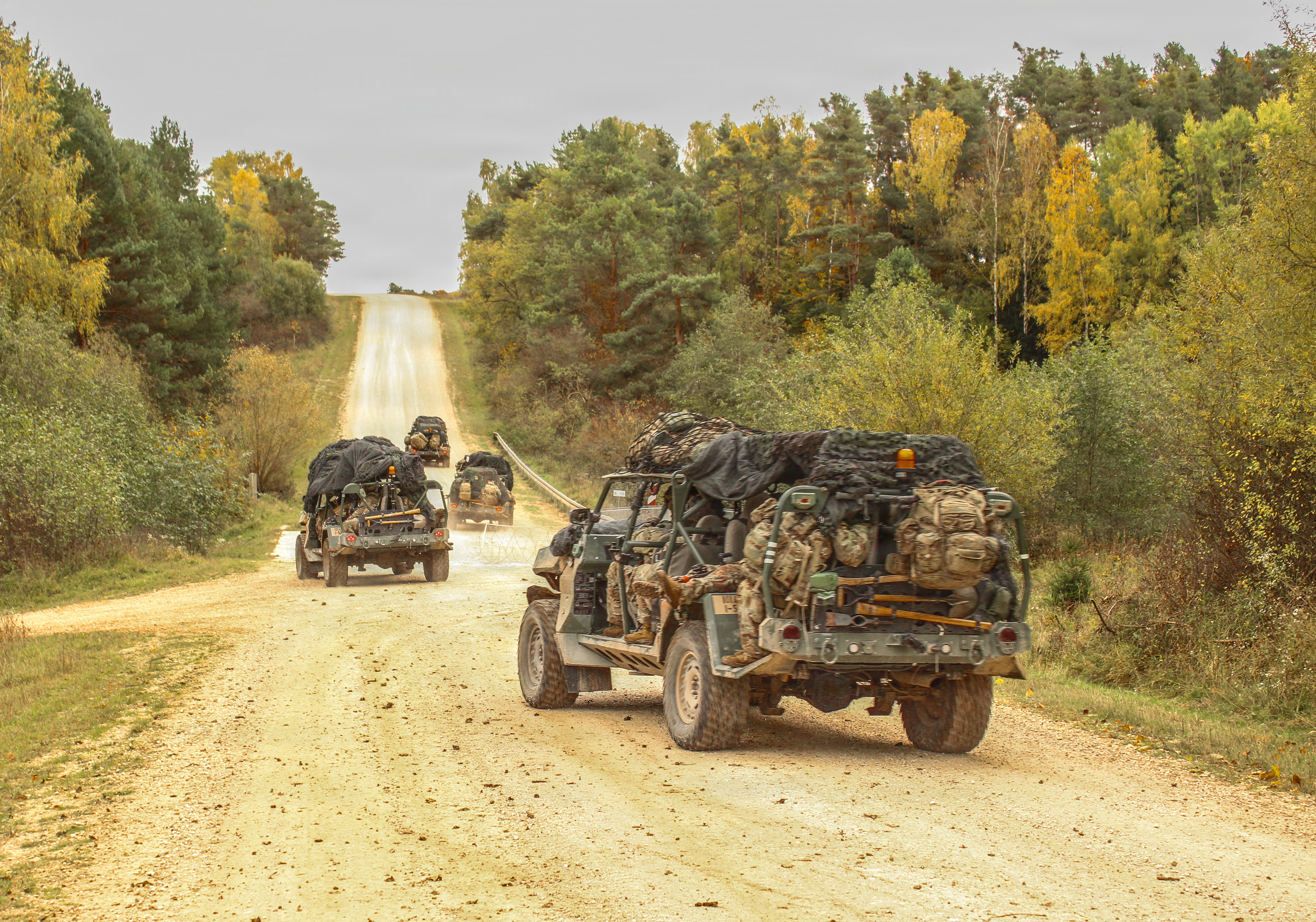
2nd Brigade, 101st Airborne Division soldiers utilize ISVs during training in Germany, 2025

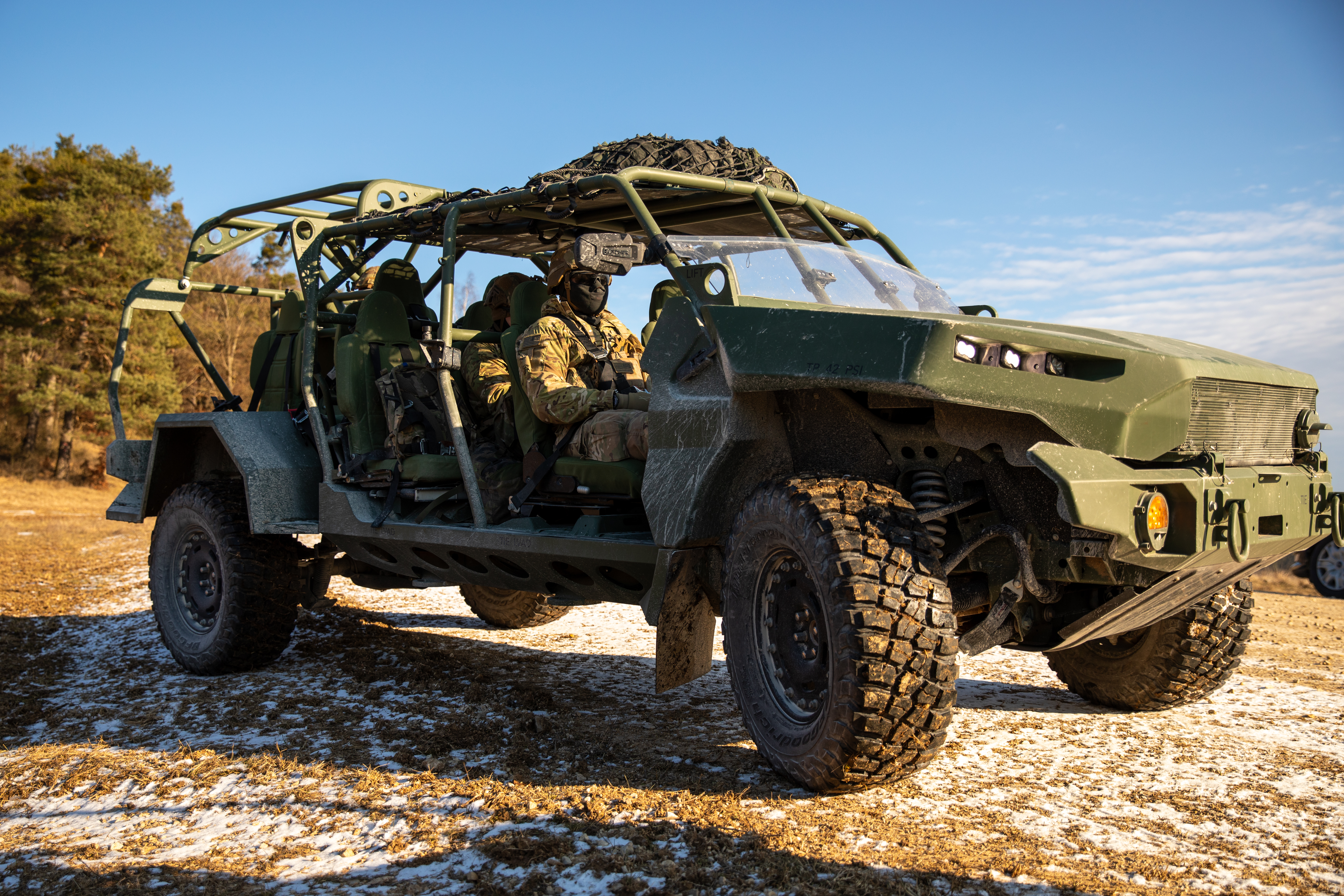
M1301 of 10th Mountain Division in Germany, 2025.

== Production ==
In June 2020 the U.S. Army awarded GM/Ricardo a $214 million contract to build 649 ISVs at a per vehicle cost of just over $330,000. The total Army requirement is 2,065 ISVs. The first delivery is to be made to the 1st Brigade, 82nd Airborne Division. The vehicles will rely heavily on motorsport technology, with suspension modifications from Rod Hall Products, which sells modifications for the road-going version of the Colorado ZR2, and chassis modifications are to be built in Mooresville, North Carolina by Hendrick Motorsports. Vehicles will be delivered from GM's new Charlotte Technical Center in Concord, North Carolina. The ISV was approved for full-rate production in April 2023; 300 vehicles had been delivered so far to field in five brigade sets of roughly 59 each.

In January 2022, the Pentagon's chief weapons tester reported the vehicle would be unsuitable against a "near-peer threat," although the Army contended that the platform is intended to act as a troop carrier and not as a fighting vehicle; units are supposed to avoid threats or dismount if engaged rather than fight from the vehicles themselves.

GM Defense has since converted one of its bid vehicles for the ISV to an all-electric version. A variant of the ISV, carrying a 12.7 mm (.50) caliber gun and five infantrymen was on display at AUSA in October 2021.

In July 2024 the Canadian government announced the acquisition of 90 vehicles in phase 1, with an option for a further 18, to equip the Canadian Army with Light Forces as part of EFP Latvia. 36 will be cargo variants and 54 personnel variants and will be received by October 2024. Phase 2 is to see the acquisition of up to 222 in cargo and personnel variants and up to 23 light trailers.

== See also ==
- Light Strike Vehicle (Spider/Flyer) – (Singapore)
- P6 ATAV – (Indonesia)
- VLEGA Gaucho – (Argentina)
- Chivunk – (Brazil)
