= SPECTRE light vehicle =

General Dynamics Land Systems Force Protection JAMMA/SPECTRE light vehicle
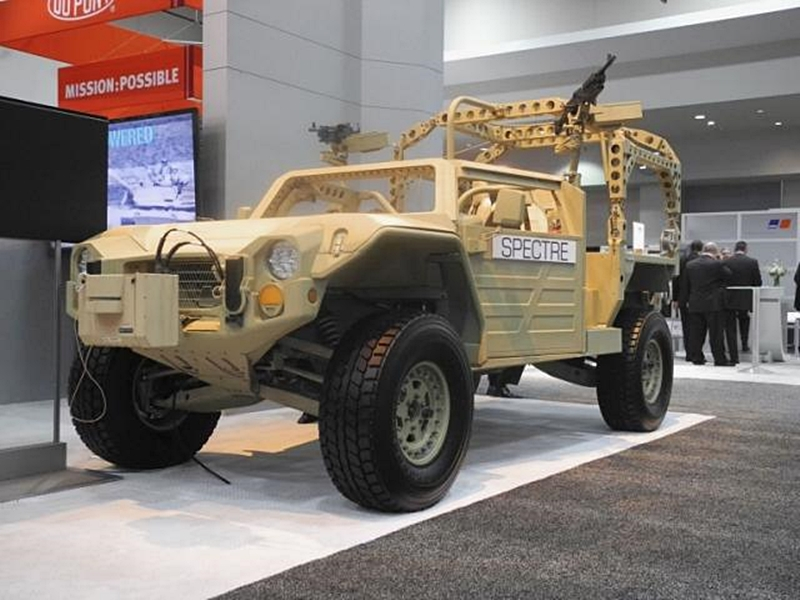
- SPECTRE (rebranded from JAMMA) on display at AUSA 2012.
- Type: Light air-portable utility/special forces-type vehicle
- Place of origin: United States of America

Service history
- In service: Developmental/prototypes only

Production history
- Designer: TAC-V / MIDDLECOTT
- Designed: 2005 (not confirmed)
- Manufacturer: TAC-V / Force Protection / General Dynamics Land Systems (GDLS) Force Protection
- Unit cost: <$350,000 in GMV1.1 configuration
- Produced: Prototypes from 2005

Specifications
- Mass: 3310 kg (unladen), 6577 kg (laden), 3267 kg (payload) in GMV1.1 configuration
- Length: 5.33 m
- Width: 2.019 m
- Height: 2.8 m (operational), 1.81 m (CH-47 internal transport)
- Crew: Driver plus up to 5 depending on configuration
- Armor: Limited small arms fire and underbody blast protection optional
- Main armament: Automatic grenade launcher and heavy and light machine gun options depending on configuration
- Engine: Steyr M16 TCI 3.2-litre, 6-cylinder inline turbocharged water-cooled diesel 180 hp @ 3800 rpm and 540 Nm torque @ 1800 rpm
- Power/weight: 27.4 hp per tonne, laden in GMV1.1 configuration
- Payload capacity: 3267 kg in GMV1.1 configuration
- Transmission: Automatic
- Suspension: Coil sprung fully independent short-long arm type front and rear; 483 mm travel
- Fuel capacity: 144 litres
- Maximum speed: 137 km/h (governed)
- Steering system: Power-assisted

The SPECTRE is a lightweight all-terrain vehicle originally intended to replace the AM General High Mobility Multipurpose Wheeled Vehicle (HMMWV) in some roles. As development of the Joint All-Terrain Modular Mobility Asset (JAMMA) vehicle (later renamed SPECTRE) progressed, the type became more focused on long range patrol and special forces type roles. According to General Dynamics, the SPECTRE is no longer marketed, and none are known to have been sold.

== History ==
The TAC-V Joint All-Terrain Modular Mobility Asset (JAMMA) family of vehicles has origins that date back to 2005. The vehicle was part-designed by Brook Banham from Detroit, Michigan-based design consultancy MIDDLECOTT DESIGN, and was initially promoted as a replacement for the AM General High Mobility Multi-purpose Wheeled Vehicle (HMMWV or Humvee) and also as capable of internal transport by the Bell Boeing V-22 Osprey tilt-rotor aircraft.

The rights to produce the design were acquired from North Hollywood, California-based TAC-V by Force Protection, Inc., and was first shown publicly as a Force Protection product in February 2010 at the Association of the United States Army (AUSA) Winter Convention.

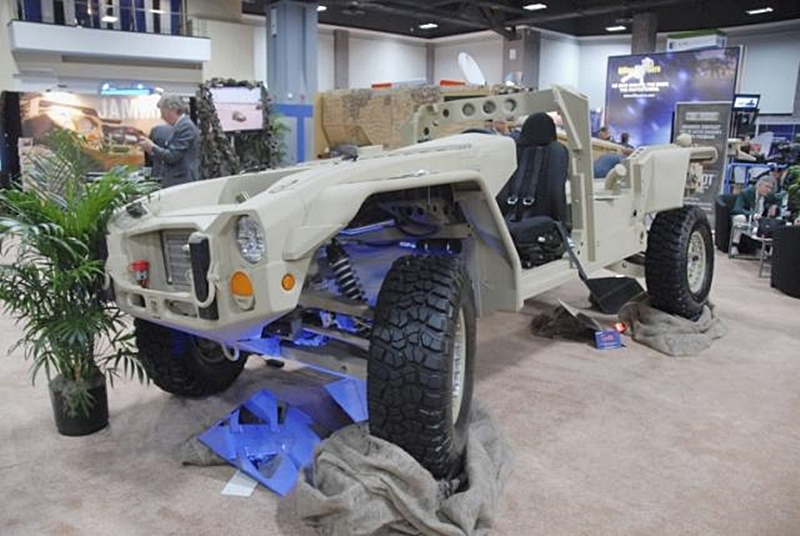
The JAMMA design was acquired from TAC-V by Force Protection Inc, and was shown publicly at the AUSA Winter Convention in February 2010.

In December 2011 it was announced that General Dynamics (GD) had completed the acquisition of Force Protection, Inc. for around $360 m, the acquisition first disclosed in November 2011.

General Dynamics Land Systems Force Protection (GDLS) continued with the development of JAMMA, which by now had been ruled out of any HMMWV replacement competition, since emerging specifications required more payload and greater protection. In June 2012, the United States Special Operations Command (SOCOM) expressed interest in procuring Non Developmental Item (NDI) vehicles that would be highly mobile, V-22 transportable platforms. The marines were also seeking a replacement for the M1161 Growler ITV, running parallel with SOCOM's efforts to develop a new Osprey-transportable vehicle. In August 2012, the design (re-branded as SPECTRE) was offered to meet the SOCOM Ground Mobility Vehicle 1.1 (GMV 1.1) requirement.

At this time GDLS marketed the SPECTRE in Narrow Track Configuration (NTC - V-22 compatible) and Wide Track Configuration (WTC – CH-47 compatible). According to GDLS the SPECTRE is no longer marketed.

== Description ==
The SPECTRE (previously JAMMA) vehicles are designed around a modular skateboard-type chassis fitted with a modular mission adaptable body.

The original JAMMA design was internally transportable by V-22 Osprey tilt-rotor aircraft, and was demonstrated with hybrid diesel-electric drive, electric drive, and the capability to generate in excess of 20 kW of continuous export power. A wider variant that is internally transportable by CH-47 Chinook helicopter was also developed. In addition to internal transport, the Spectre was also designed to be transported as an underslung load.

The base design is modular and could be configured to suit a variety of specialist roles, these including utility, gun truck and rescue. Other options included exportable power, various winches, air compressor kits and hybrid or electric drive.

Two operators are seated behind the driver and commander, the rear platform hosting the machine gunner and at least two other personnel (maximum seating is for seven). The rear platform carries a roll-over cage that is much taller than the front part of the vehicle (for air transport the cage can be collapsed by hand in less than 90 seconds from 2.80metres to 1.82). The design offers rollover protection (ROPS) as standard, with scalable protection optional. An armour attachment system is built-in at the design stage.

Suspension is fully independent coil-sprung and of the double A-arm type. Optional mobility enhancements included run-flat inserts and a central tyre inflation system (CTIS). Quoted standard tyre size for WTC variants is 37 × 25.50R 16.5, and for NTC variants is 285/70 R17.

== Similar vehicles ==
- General Dynamics Flyer / Flyer 60 and Flyer 72.
- Navistar Special Operations Tactical Vehicle (SOTV).
- Singapore Technologies Kinetics (STK) Flyer.
- Singapore Technologies Kinetics (STK) Spider .
- Northrop Grumman Medium Assault Vehicle – Light (MAV-L).
- Oshkosh Special Purpose All-Terrain Vehicle (S-ATV).
- HDT Global Storm Search and Rescue Tactical Vehicle.
- Land Rover Wolf (Defender XD) WMIK / RWMIK.
- Supacat LRV 200.
- Supacat Jackal (vehicle).
