= M1288 GMV 1.1 =

U.S. Special Operations Command light utility vehicle

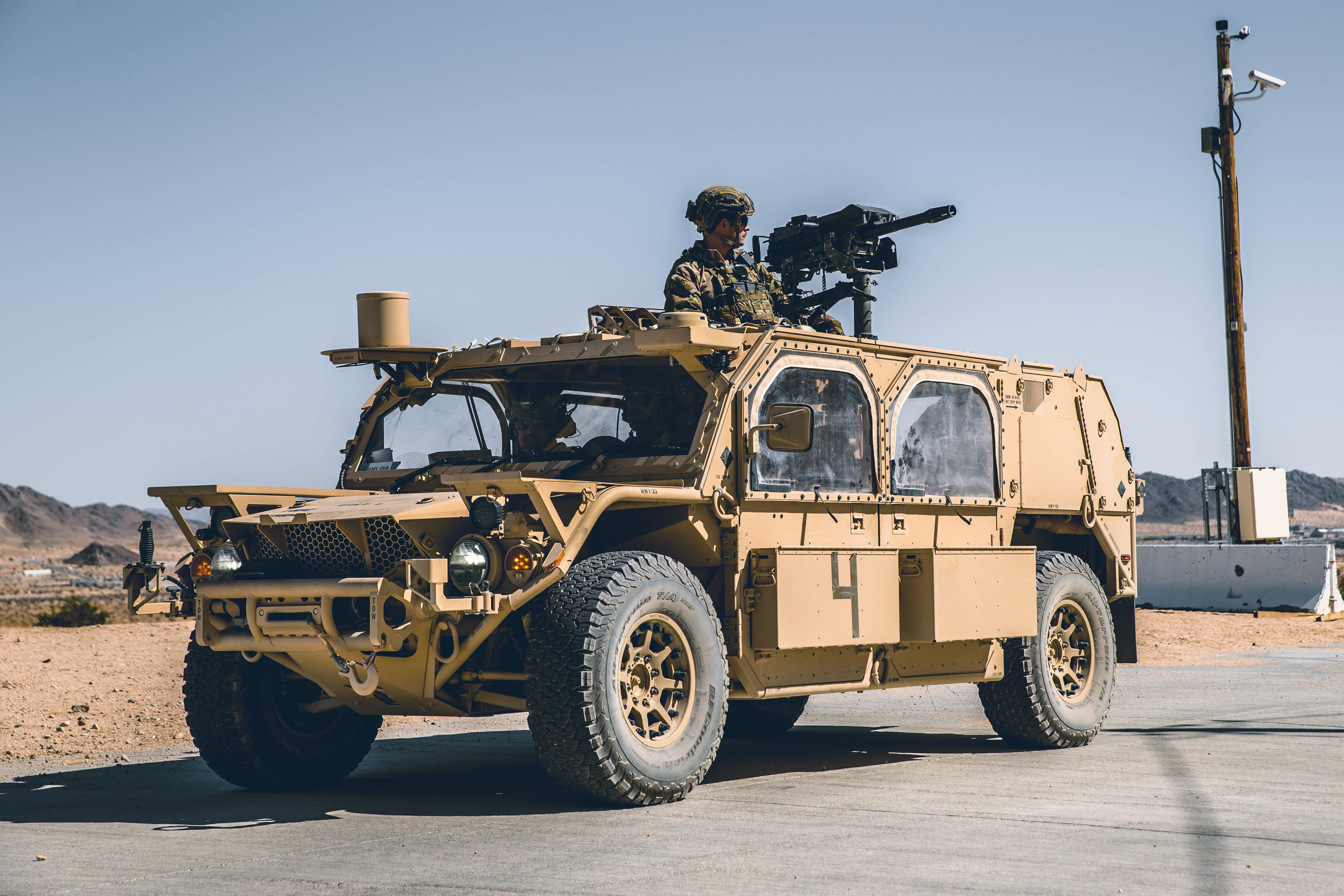
GMV 1.1 equipped with a Mk 19 grenade launcher driven by U.S. Army Special Operation operators with the Green Berets from 3rd Special Forces Group.

The M1288 GMV 1.1 is a U.S. Special Operations Command light utility vehicle based on the General Dynamics Flyer 72. The GMV 1.1 replaces the Humvee-based Ground Mobility Vehicle (USSOCOM).

== History ==
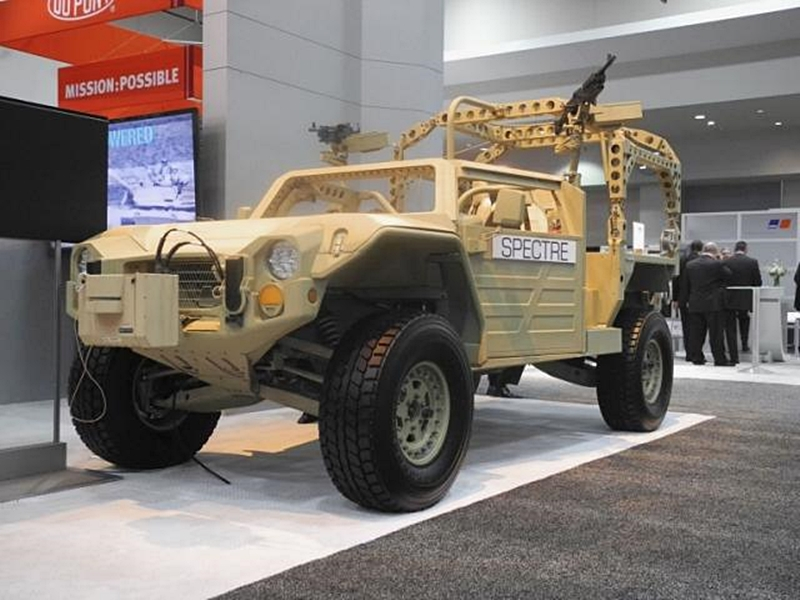
In August 2012, the JAMMA, or SPECTRE vehicle, was offered for the GMV 1.1 requirement.

In June 2012, the SOCOM requested proposals for a new, better GMV, version 1.1. By contrast to converted Humvees, the vehicle needed to be lighter, faster, more easily transportable by air, sea, and land, and contain next generation communications and computing equipment. The vehicle was expected to be selected by the end of 2012, with production beginning in 2013. 1,300 of the new vehicles are to be in service by 2020. Vehicles entered were the Northrop Grumman Medium Assault Vehicle – Light (MAV-L), AM General's reengineered GMV design, HDT Global's Storm SRTV, the Oshkosh Special Purpose All-Terrain Vehicle (S-ATV), the Navistar Special Operations Tactical Vehicle (SOTV), and General Dynamics Flyer. The winner was expected to be selected in May 2013. The decision for the winner was delayed until August 2013 to work through processes in dealing with vendors.

The remaining contenders included the AM General upgraded GMV, the General Dynamics Flyer, and the Navistar SOTV. In August 2013, General Dynamics was selected as the winner of the contract, potentially valued at $562 million. The vehicle will replace 1,092 GMVs, with funds to buy the first 101 in FY 2014 at $245,000 per vehicle.

In September 2013, AM General and Navistar filed protests over the decision to award the contract to General Dynamics. In December 2013, the Government Accountability Office (GAO) denied Navistar and AM General's protests. In January 2014, AM General sued the SOCOM in the Court of Federal Claims. In April 2014, the US Federal Claims Court rejected AM General's lawsuit, allowing General Dynamics to resume work and continue with the contract.

== M1297 Army Ground Mobility Vehicle ==
The Army is purchasing a limited number of GMVs through SOCOM's GMV 1.1 program as an interim capability. In May 2018, the Army awarded General Dynamics Ordnance and Tactical Systems (GD-OTS) a $33.8 million contract for the production of GMV 1.1s, which have been type classified as the M1297 Army Ground Mobility Vehicle.

== Users ==
- United Arab Emirates: Reported to be in service with the UAE military since March 2022 in an APC configuration.
