= General Dynamics Flyer =

Flyer 60, 72; (A-)GMV 1.1
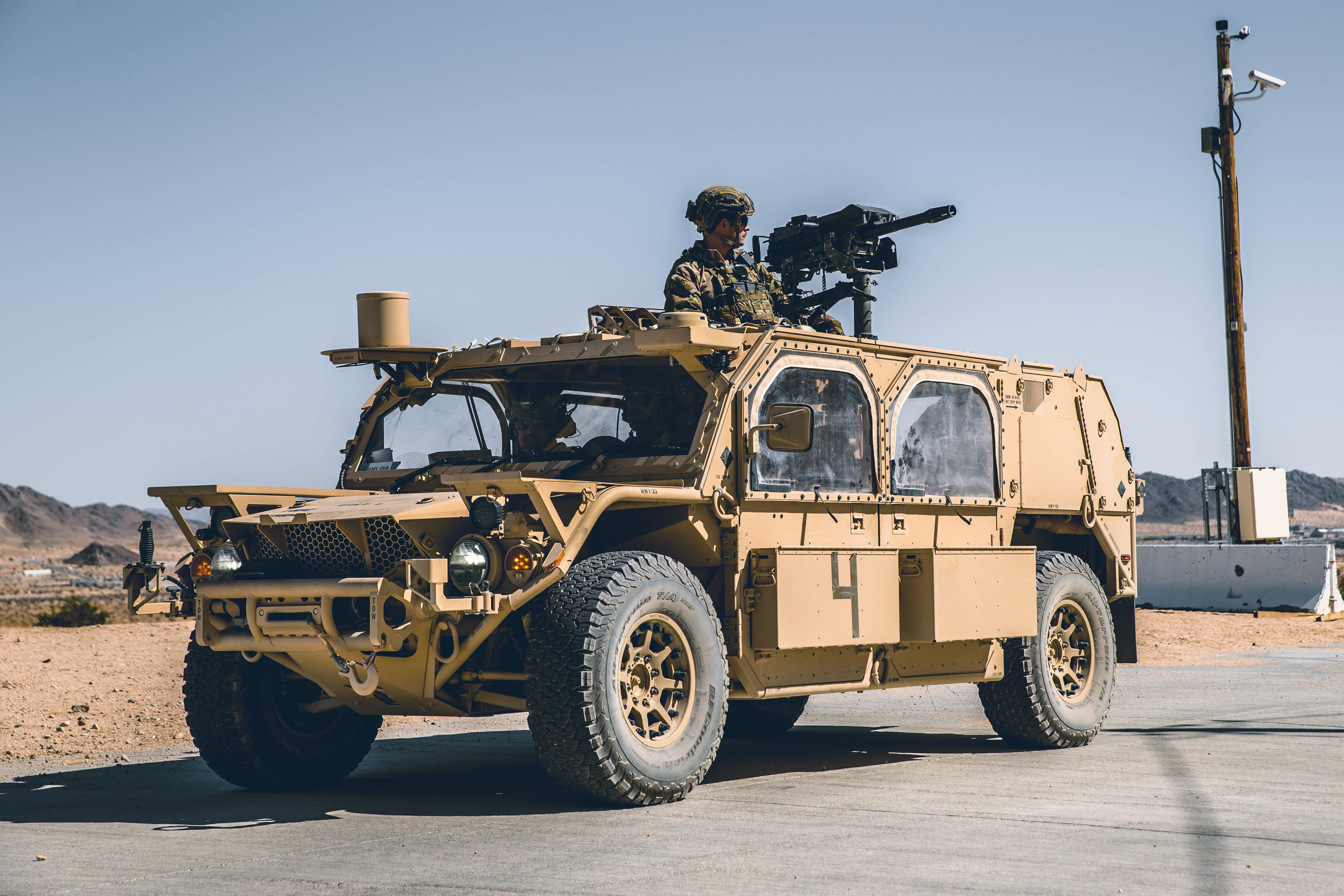
- Flyer 72 GMV 1.1 'Ground Mobility Vehicle'
- Type: Light strike vehicle
- Place of origin: United States

Service history
- In service: 2013–present
- Used by: United States Special Operations Command; United States Army

Production history
- Designer: General Dynamics & Flyer Defense LLC
- Manufacturer: General Dynamics
- Unit cost: Unarmored: $245,000 (€143,000 for Italian Army contract in 2015)
- No. built: M1288 GMV 1.1 – 1,297 units M1297 A-GMV 1.1 — 300 units ordered; 1700 optional, Flyer II V-22 ITV — Three AFSOC evaluation units
- Variants: Flyer 60 / Flyer II V-22 ITV; Flyer 72 — M1288 GMV 1.1; M1297 A-GMV 1.1

Specifications
- Mass: Flyer 60 / Flyer II V-22 ITV — 4,500 lb (2,041 kg) curb wt. Flyer 72 — 5,500 lb (2,495 kg) curb weight M1288 GMV 1.1 — 6,840 lb (3,103 kg)
- Length: Flyer 60 / Flyer II V-22 ITV — 180 in (4.57 m); Flyer 72 — 182 in (4.62 m) / 193 in (4.90 m) with winch and pushbar M1288 GMV 1.1 — 210 in (5.33 m)
- length: Wheelbase: 126 in (3.20 m)
- Width: Flyer 60 / Flyer II V-22 ITV — 60 in (1.52 m); M1288 GMV 1.1 — 79.6 in (2.02 m); Other variants: 72 in (1.83 m) chassis 79.25 in (2.01 m) width at tires 85 in (2.16 m) with side cargo boxes
- Height: 60 in (1.52 m) roof top 72.25 in (1.84 m) to roof rack / armament
- Crew: Flyer 60: 2 + 2 = 4 seats Flyer 72: Up to 9 seats: 3 front, 3 rear, 2 rear deck, 1 gunner seat M1288 GMV 1.1: 6 / 7 Operators
- Main armament: Various
- Engine: 1.95 L (119 cu in) Direct injection (Euro V) DOHC Turbodiesel / JP8; 195 hp (145 kW) — 295 ft.-lb. (400 Nm)
- Payload capacity: Flyer 60 / Flyer II V-22 ITV — 3,500 lb (1,588 kg); Flyer 72 — 5,700 lb (2,585 kg); M1288 GMV 1.1 — 4,360 lb (1,978 kg); M1297 A-GMV 1.1 — 5,000 lb (2,268 kg)
- Transmission: 6 speed automatic (tiptronic)
- Suspension: 4-wheel coil over shocks independent suspension with 4 air spring variable ride
- Ground clearance: 17 in (43 cm)
- Fuel capacity: Flyer 72 — 26 gal. (98 L); Other — 32 gal. (145 L)
- Operational range: Flyer 60 — 350 mi (560 km) cruise range Flyer II V-22 ITV — 450 mi (720 km); Flyer 72 — 300 mi (480 km) on mission profile / 500 mi (800 km) on-road @ 40 mph (64 km/h); M1288 GMV 1.1 — 408 mi (657 km)
- Maximum speed: Flyer 60 / Flyer II V-22 ITV — 65 mph (105 km/h) Terrain / 75 mph (121 km/h) On-road; Flyer 72 — 95 mph (153 km/h); M1288 GMV 1.1 — 73.3 mph (118 km/h)

The Flyer Advanced Light Strike Vehicle platform has been developed by General Dynamics Ordnance and Tactical Systems (GD-OTS), in partnership with Flyer Defense LLC, for the U.S. Special Operations Command (SOCOM) Ground Mobility Vehicle Program. The Flyer Advanced Light Strike Vehicle platform configurations are the Flyer 72 and the narrower Flyer 60.

== Design ==
The Flyer was designed to fill a need by special operations forces to have a lightweight, mobile platform that could be transported by air and be configured for a variety of missions. It can be internally transported by V-22 Osprey, CH-53E Super Stallion, CH-47D Chinook, C-130 Hercules, Boeing C-17 Globemaster III and C-5 Galaxy, and be externally transported by UH-60L Black Hawk. The vehicle can operate at high speeds at long ranges, off-road and in various weather conditions. It can be configured for many roles including light strike, personnel rescue and recovery, reconnaissance, and communications.

The Flyer has a fuel efficiency of 10.2 km/L (24 mpg) at 64 km/h (40 mph). Weapons can be mounted on a 360 degree ring or five patient litters can be carried. It also has an armored variant, with the 4-door cab, rear cargo area, and roofline armored to ballistic level B6.

== Variants ==
=== Flyer 72 ===
The Flyer 72 is in service in the United States Special Operations Command as the M1288 GMV 1.1. It was selected in 2013 to replace SOCOM's fleet of 1,072 Humvee-based Ground Mobility Vehicles. 1,300 are planned to be in service by September 2020.

The United Kingdom Special Forces (UKSF) received a Flyer 72 in 2014 for testing under Project Westerly, a program to evaluate vehicles for the potential replacement of their Supacat HMT400 Surveillance and Reconnaissance Vehicle/Offensive Action Vehicles that entered service in 2003.

General Dynamics offered modified Flyer vehicles to the U.S. Army for their 'Ultra Light Combat Vehicle' (ULCV), since renamed the Army Ground Mobility Vehicle (AGMV), and Light Reconnaissance Vehicle (LRV) programs. The Special Forces Flyer 72 version had SOF-specific items removed and more seats added to meet ULCV requirements for a weight of 4,500 lb (2,000 kg) and a 3,200 lb (1,500 kg) payload, equal to nine soldiers and their gear. For the LRV, the Flyer 72 could have armor added, carry six troops, and mount an M230 chain gun.

In May 2018, the Army awarded GD-OTS the contract for production of Army Ground Mobility Vehicles.

A consortium of Oshkosh Defense and Flyer Defense LLC submitted the Flyer 72 for the U.S. Army's Infantry Squad Vehicle competition. This contract was won by a consortium of GM Defense and Ricardo plc, which submitted a vehicle based on the Chevrolet Colorado ZR2.

=== Flyer 60 ===
On 21 October 2013, General Dynamics was awarded a SOCOM contract for non-developmental V-22 Internally Transportable Vehicles (ITV). The three-year indefinite delivery, indefinite quantity contract is for up to 10 vehicles, with integration and logistical support and training. The total value of the contract is $5.8 million if all options are exercised. The basic difference between the Flyer 72 and Flyer 60 is width – at 72 in (1.83 m) vs. 60 in (1.52 m) respectively. They share the same engine, suspension, transmission, and electrical systems. The Flyer 60 seats only four, with a length of 180 in (4.57 m), a height of 60 in (1.52 m), curb weight of 4,500 lb (2,041 kg), and payload of 3,500 lb (1,588 kg).

== Operators ==
- Czech Republic - Czech Armed Forces: Flyer 72 HD used by 43rd Airborne Regiment
- Greece - Hellenic Army: Flyer I, 4+ for 1st Raider–Paratrooper Brigade, 1st Infantry Division
- Israel - Israel Defense Forces (IDF): Dozens of Flyer 72 vehicles, named "Beeri," were acquired in late 2023 during "Operation Swords of Iron" to replace damaged armored vehicles after the October 7 attacks.
- Italy - Italian Army: Flyer III, 9 + 18 on option for 9th Paratroopers Assault Regiment "Col Moschin" (SF) On January 30, 2024, more Flyer 72s are planned to be purchased in a €229.6 million (US$248.4 million) programme approved by the Italian Parliament.
- United States - SOCOM: 1,300 planned
- United Arab Emirates UAE operating GD-OTS Flyer vehicles
- Ukraine - Used by Ukrainian special operations forces.
- United Kingdom - UKSF: 1 on test

== See also ==
- Light Strike Vehicle (Spider/Flyer) – (Singapore)
- P6 ATAV – (Indonesia)
- VLEGA Gaucho – (Argentina)
- Chivunk – (Brazil)
