= GM Defense =

Military subsidiary of General Motors

- Type: Subsidiary (LLC)
- Industry: Automotive
- Founded: 1914; 112 years ago (1st vehicle)
- Founder: General Motors
- Headquarters: Concord, North Carolina, United States
- Area served: United States
- Key people: Stephen S. duMont (President)
- Products: Military vehicles
- Owner: General Motors
- Parent: General Motors
- Website: gmdefensellc.com

GM Defense is the military product subsidiary of General Motors, headquartered in Concord, North Carolina. It focuses on defense industry needs with hydrogen fuel cell and other advanced mobility technologies. GM Defense projects include SURUS (Silent Utility Rover Universal Superstructure), an autonomous modular platform joint project with the United States Army.

ZH2 are modified Chevrolet medium and full size pickups modified for military needs. The ZH2, fitted with a hydrogen fuel cell and electric drive, has a stealthy drive system which produces a very low smoke, noise, odor and thermal signature. This allows soldiers to conduct silent watch and silent mobility missions on the battlefield.

General Motors, the Office of Naval Research and the U.S. Naval Research Laboratory are cooperating to incorporate automotive hydrogen fuel cell systems into the next generation of Navy unmanned undersea vehicles, or UUVs. Hydrogen fuel cell technology could augment ships and subs on patrol.

== History ==
The original GM Defense was founded in 1950, and acquired by General Dynamics in 2003. This later became part of the General Dynamics Land Systems division.

In 2017, General Motors announced the company's return to the defense industry.

== Current projects ==
Model	Type	Notes
Infantry Squad Vehicle	Light utility vehicle	Air-transportable high-speed, light utility vehicle based on the Chevrolet Colorado ZR2 selected by the U.S. Army in June 2020.
Chevrolet Colorado ZH2	Military truck	Extreme off-road-capable fuel-cell-powered electric vehicle. Based on the Chevrolet Colorado. The Colorado ZH2 is the product of a joint venture between GM and TARDEC—the U.S. Army’s Tank Automotive Research, Development, and Engineering Center.
SURUS - Silent Utility Rover Universal Super Structure	Modular military platform	GM-U.S. Army collaboration on a modular experimental light- and medium-duty fuel-cell truck platform. Autonomous fuel cell vehicle with highly modular and adaptable superstructure. Powered by Hydrotec and JOULETEC propulsion systems.
Chevrolet Silverado ZH2	Military truck	GM has developed a new 'ZH2' hydrogen fuel cell-powered electric truck, with a next-generation engine and a Chevrolet Silverado chassis. The Silverado ZH2 can output up to 100 kW of power.
UUV	Unmanned Underwater Vehicle	A partnership with General Motors and the Office of Naval Research and the U.S. Naval Research Laboratory partnership for automotive hydrogen fuel cell systems into the next generation of Navy unmanned undersea vehicles, or UUVs. The UUV leverages GM Hydrotec fuel cell technology common with the Colorado ZH2.
HD SUV	Light utility vehicle	An armored, heavy-duty version of the Chevrolet Suburban developed for the U.S. Department of State DSS.

== Previous products ==
Products produced by the former GM Defense in past include:

Model	Type	Notes
MILCOTS (Militarized Commercial Off-The-Shelf (Milverado)	military truck	based on Chevrolet Silverado; now being used by the US Army under the COMBATT (Commercial Based Tactical Truck) program
MLVW (medium logistic vehicle, wheeled)	military truck	M35 series 2½-ton 6×6 cargo truck
Cougar AVGP	armoured fighting vehicle	based on Mowag Piranha with Scorpion tank turret
Grizzly AVGP	armoured fighting vehicle	based on Mowag Piranha with Cadillac Gage turret
Husky AVGP	armoured fighting vehicle	based on Mowag Piranha
LAV-25	armoured fighting vehicle	developed from Mowag Piranha family
Coyote Reconnaissance Vehicle	armoured fighting vehicle	developed from LAV-25 family
LAV III	armoured fighting vehicle	developed from LAV-25 family
TRILS	Tactical Radar Identification and Location System)	based on Bison APC platform
Stryker	armoured fighting vehicle	based on LAV III

With the sale to General Dynamics, only the Stryker product lines are still in production. The M54 truck is no longer in production. MILCOT was transitioned to the US Army's COMBATT program.

== Facilities ==
- Washington, DC - Headquarters
- Concord, NC - Infantry Squad Vehicle Production Facility
