= M1297 Army ground mobility vehicle =

Ground Mobility Vehicle
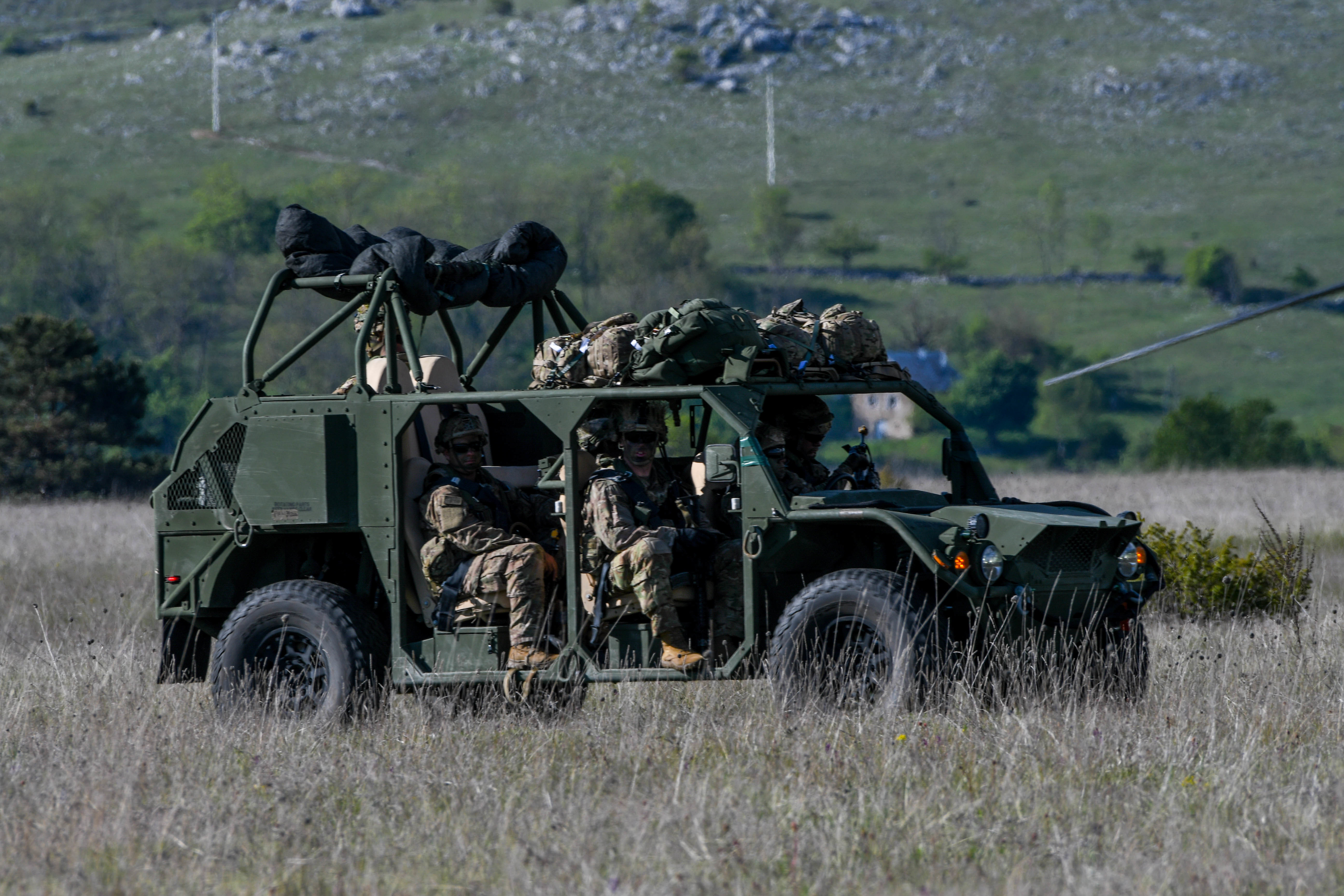
- A-GMV during exercise Immediate Response 19
- Type: Truck
- Place of origin: United States

Specifications
- Mass: Over 2,700 kg (6,000 lbs)
- Crew: 9 occupants
- Payload capacity: over 5,000 pounds (2,300 kg)
- Operational range: 250 mi (400 km)

173rd Airborne Brigade's overview of the M1297 A-GMV (2019) (1:02)

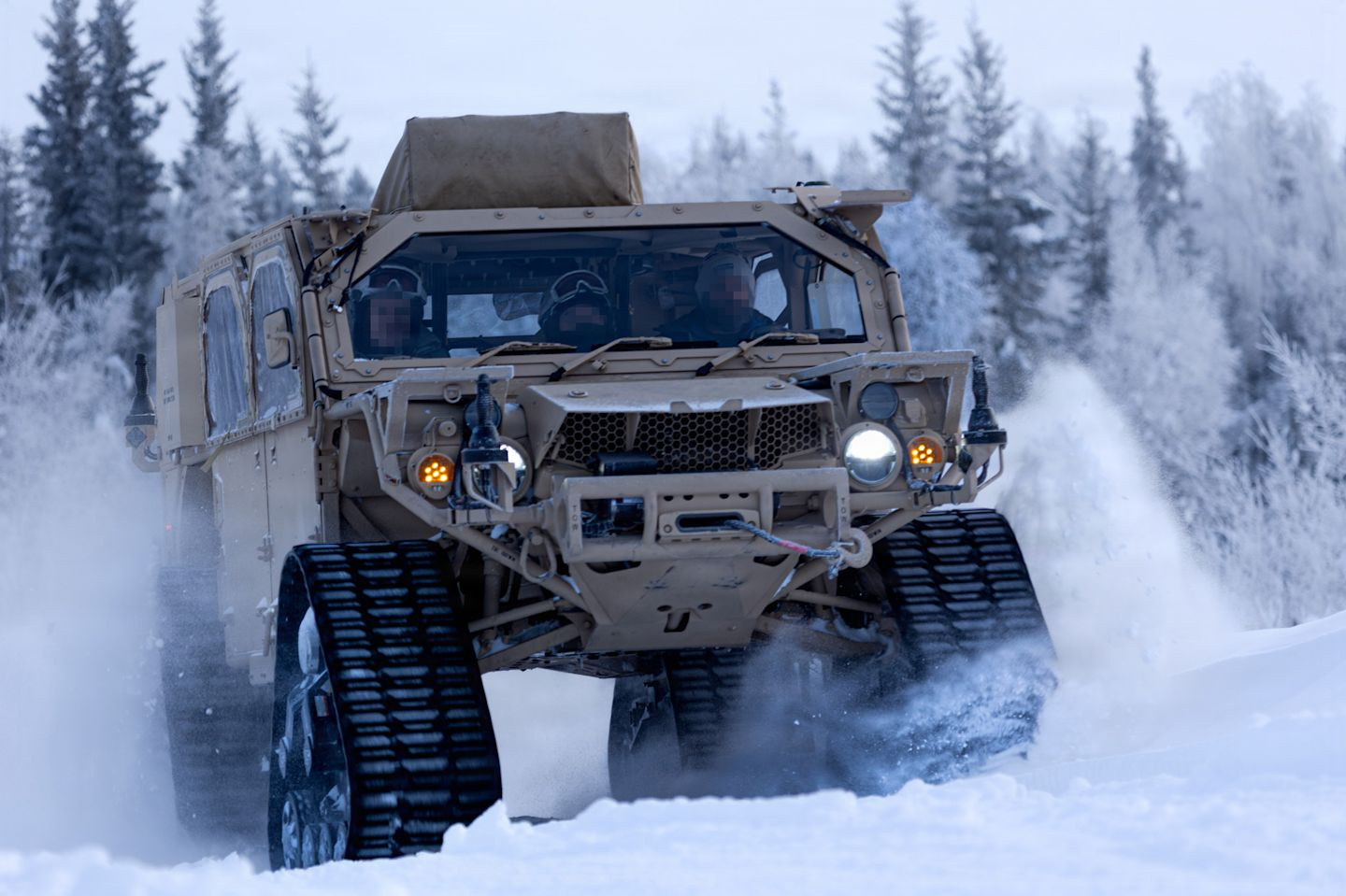
An A-GMV with snow tracks conducts cold weather training at Fort Wainwright, AK

The M1297 Army Ground Mobility Vehicle (A-GMV or AGMV), previously just GMV, and formerly called the Ultra Light Combat Vehicle (ULCV), is a U.S. Army airdroppable light off-road vehicle for light infantry brigades. The A-GMV is produced by General Dynamics. The design is closely based on the M1288 GMV 1.1, which is itself based on the Flyer 72.

In March 2015, the Army changed the name of the Ultra Light Combat Vehicle to the Ground Mobility Vehicle. A-GMV is intended to be carried internally in a CH-47 Chinook or externally by a UH-60 Black Hawk. In order to be survivable but transportable, the GMV would be lightly armored and use speed, maneuverability, and off-road mobility to avoid major threats. The A-GMV is configured to carry an airborne infantry combat squad of nine paratroopers, and their gear – a payload capacity of over 5,000 pounds (2,300 kg). The vehicle has an open design, modifiable into flexible configurations, by remote and manned turrets, armor, or arctic kits.

The AGMV was a limited purchase through USSOCOM's GMV 1.1 program. The Infantry Squad Vehicle will be purchased in greater numbers.

== Background ==
A-GMV is meant to be light and fast and deliver soldiers from a drop zone far from enemy air defenses or indirect fire systems. Five vehicles would carry a platoon headquarters, three rifle squads, and a weapons squad. The vehicle is seen as a "21st century jeep" to move troops around during an initial attack faster than the enemy can counter them with heavy weapons. Both the GMV and LRV are to replace sling-loaded Humvees in this role (but not for other units). Interest in the effort is expected on the scale of the U.S. Special Operations Command program to replace the Ground Mobility Vehicle, which also sought to replace a Humvee-based vehicle with a lighter and more air-mobile design. Airborne infantry brigades would use the vehicles to rush forces from their airborne insertion point to seize an objective, which would become a forward airfield for reinforcing and deploying heavier follow-on forces. After follow-on forces arrive and set up positions, the ULCV would not be as useful, but could potentially allow troops to operate for up to a week without support.

Army officials consider the GMV a needed addition to a global response force like the 82nd Airborne Division. Currently, airdropped infantry would be flown to a target area or driven there by trucks. Either way, they then need to dismount and walk the distance to their destination, sometimes for many miles while carrying heavy gear. The GMV would allow light infantry to be driven right to their destination, allowing them to be airdropped further away from potential enemy fire and use mobility to find an off-road avenue of approach an adversary isn't expecting, and not be fatigued once they need to fight. The idea was to acquire up to 300 vehicles by the end of 2016 at a unit cost of $149,000, which could decrease if a second increment was bought and stationed at installations for training; predicted dates were not certain as the entire effort remains subject to funding availability. Ability to be carried under a UH-60 Black Hawk in high/hot conditions is particularly important because battalion commanders cannot always get control of a CH-47 to carry heavier up-armored Humvees.

== History ==
In January 2014, the Army issued a notice to industry for a commercial-off-the-shelf air-droppable "Ultra Light Combat Vehicle" (ULCV). The information collated was used to examine the benefit of an ULCV to support mobility for Infantry Brigade Combat Team (IBCT) soldiers. The information received was used by the MCOE to screen COTS solutions for a potential follow-on static display and proof of principal event.

A Platform Performance Demonstration (ULCV-PPD) was subsequently held at Fort Bragg in June 2014 to allow potential contractors to demonstrate the capability of their vehicles.

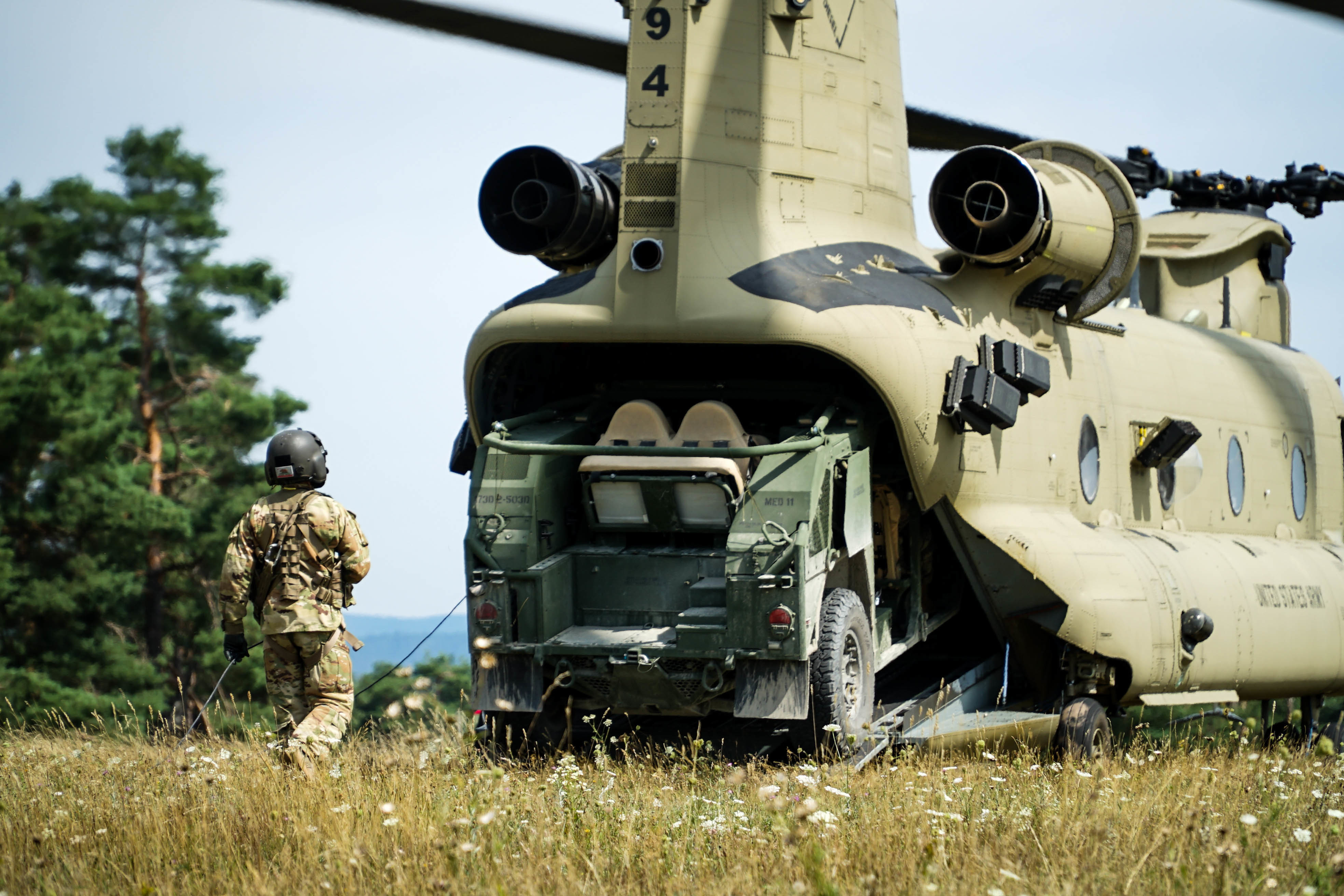
An A-GMV being loaded onto a CH-47

The PPD had vehicles demonstrate a range of threshold requirements including being driven onto and out of a CH-47 with a full nine-man squad and their equipment on board, ability to operate on various forms of terrain, be rigged and de-rigged by two soldiers within two minutes for sling-load operations, and others. Threshold requirements identify the maximum curb weight of the vehicle at 2,000 kg ( 4,500 lb) with a range of 250 mi (400 km). Six vendors took part in the technology demonstration and compared their vehicles to the Humvee as part of a global response force mission.

Candidates

The following is a list of vehicles provided at the Platform Performance Demonstration:

- General Dynamics with the M1288 GMV 1.1, A (US)SOCOM vehicle based on the Flyer 72.
- Vyper Adamas, Inc. proposed their V3X Tactical Vehicle.
- Polaris Defense proposed its Deployable Advanced Ground Off-road (DAGOR) vehicle.
- Boeing-MSI Defense with its Phantom Badger
- Hendrick Dynamics with its Commando Jeep.
- Lockheed Martin with its High Versatility Tactical Vehicle.

In March 2015, the Army changed the name of the ULCV to the Ground Mobility Vehicle (GMV). This created confusion, as the name is the same as the USSOCOM Humvee-based Ground Mobility Vehicle, and its replacement, the M1288 GMV 1.1, a vehicle also based on the Flyer 72.

The Army acknowledged General Dynamics' potential advantages because of the SOCOM contract but stated it was considering all options and would not sole-source their award.

In May 2015 the Army issued a ULCV (GMV) market questionnaire. A second RfI was issued in September.

As a "new start" program in its fiscal year (FY) 2017 budget request the Army requested US$4.9 million in FY 2017 for the program. According to the latest program-related documents, the service hopes to find a vehicle that "provides enhanced tactical mobility" for an IBCT infantry squad of nine personnel and their equipment. The vehicle must be capable of moving "quickly around the battlefield, including the ability to execute medium-distance insertion operations," using UH-60 Black Hawk utility helicopters, according to the document.

A-GMV's concept is to provide flexibility for entry operations in permissive and non-permissive environments ‘to counter threat anti-access strategies by using multiple austere entry points via air-drop, air-land, and/or air-insertion to bring in combat configured units." The Army said it plans to develop GMV to fulfil requirements "using a commercial off-the-shelf or non-developmental item vehicle," for which a firm fixed-priced contract is to be awarded through an open competition. FY 2017 funding could be used for a contract award for "GMV test vehicles for destructive testing" and initial production could be considered as soon as the fourth quarter of FY 2017 and full-rate production in the third quarter FY 2019.

The Army never formalized a competitive bid process, but in the interim, opted to purchase a limited number of GMVs through SOCOM's Ground Mobility Vehicle 1.1. In its 2018 budget request, the Army split the GMV into two phases. The second phase, called the Infantry Squad Vehicle program, was initiated to acquire 1700 additional vehicles.

In May 2018, the Army awarded General Dynamics Ordnance and Tactical Systems (GD-OTS) a $33.8 million contract for the production of 118 A-GMVs and associated kits. The vehicles will outfit three airborne brigades.

The A-GMV shares some 90 percent parts commonality with the GMV 1.1.

GD-OTS delivered the first A-GMV to the US Army, marking the First Unit Equipped (FUE), delivered within four months of contract award and consisted of vehicles, spares and training. Estimated completion of the contract is March 2019.
