= Ground Mobility Vehicle (USSOCOM) =

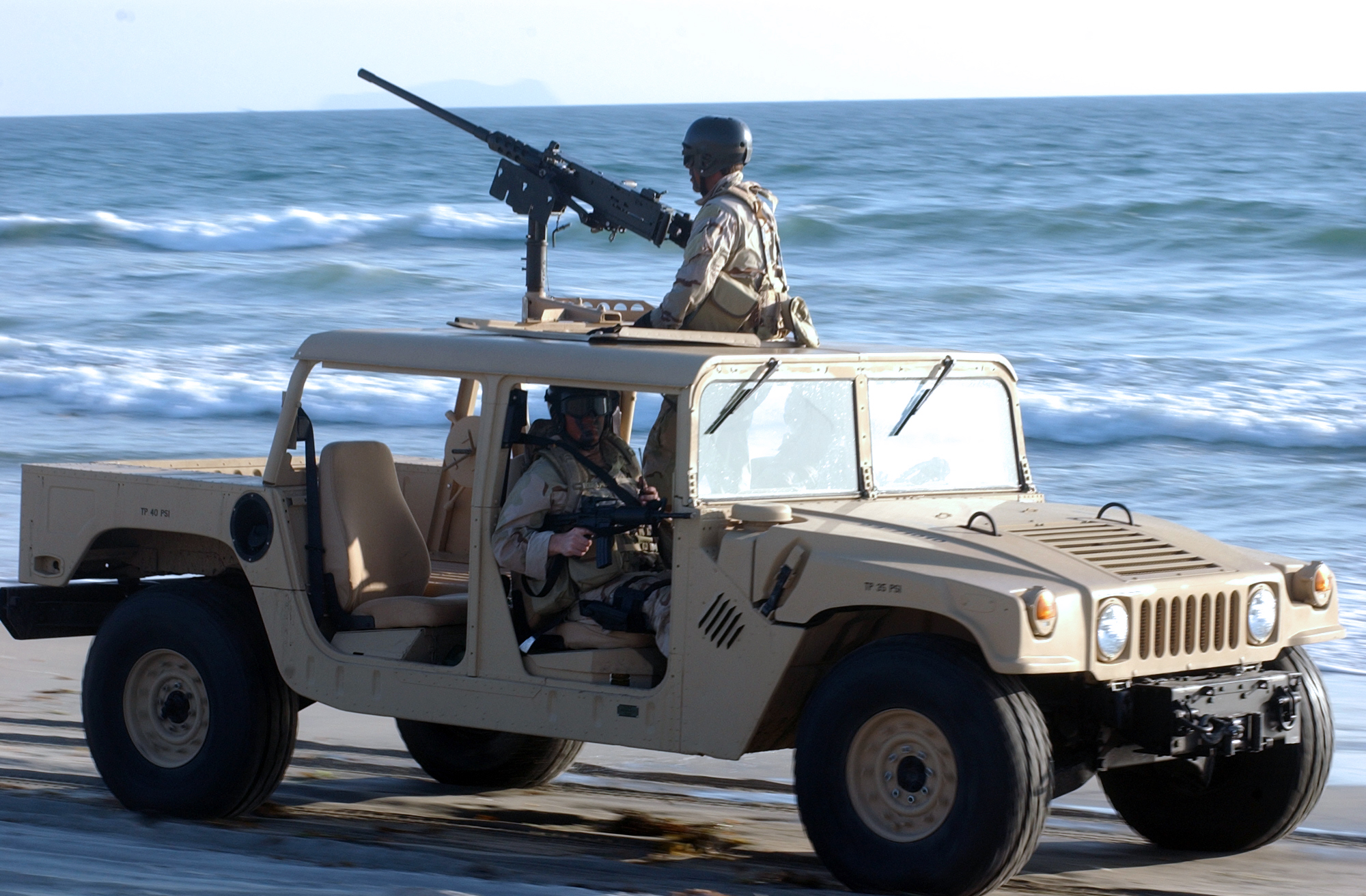
- A GMV-N armed with the M2 50 cal machine gun on the turret used by the Navy SEALs
- Type: Special Operations Light utility vehicle
- Place of origin: United States

Production history
- Variants: See Variants

Specifications
- Main armament: Can be fitted with various weapons: M2 .50 heavy machine guns; M60 machine guns; Miniguns; M240 machine guns; Mk 19 or Mk 47 40 mm automatic grenade launchers; M249 machine guns; Smoke grenade launchers
- Operational range: 275 miles (443 km)
- Maximum speed: over 70 mph (110 km/h) cruising speed

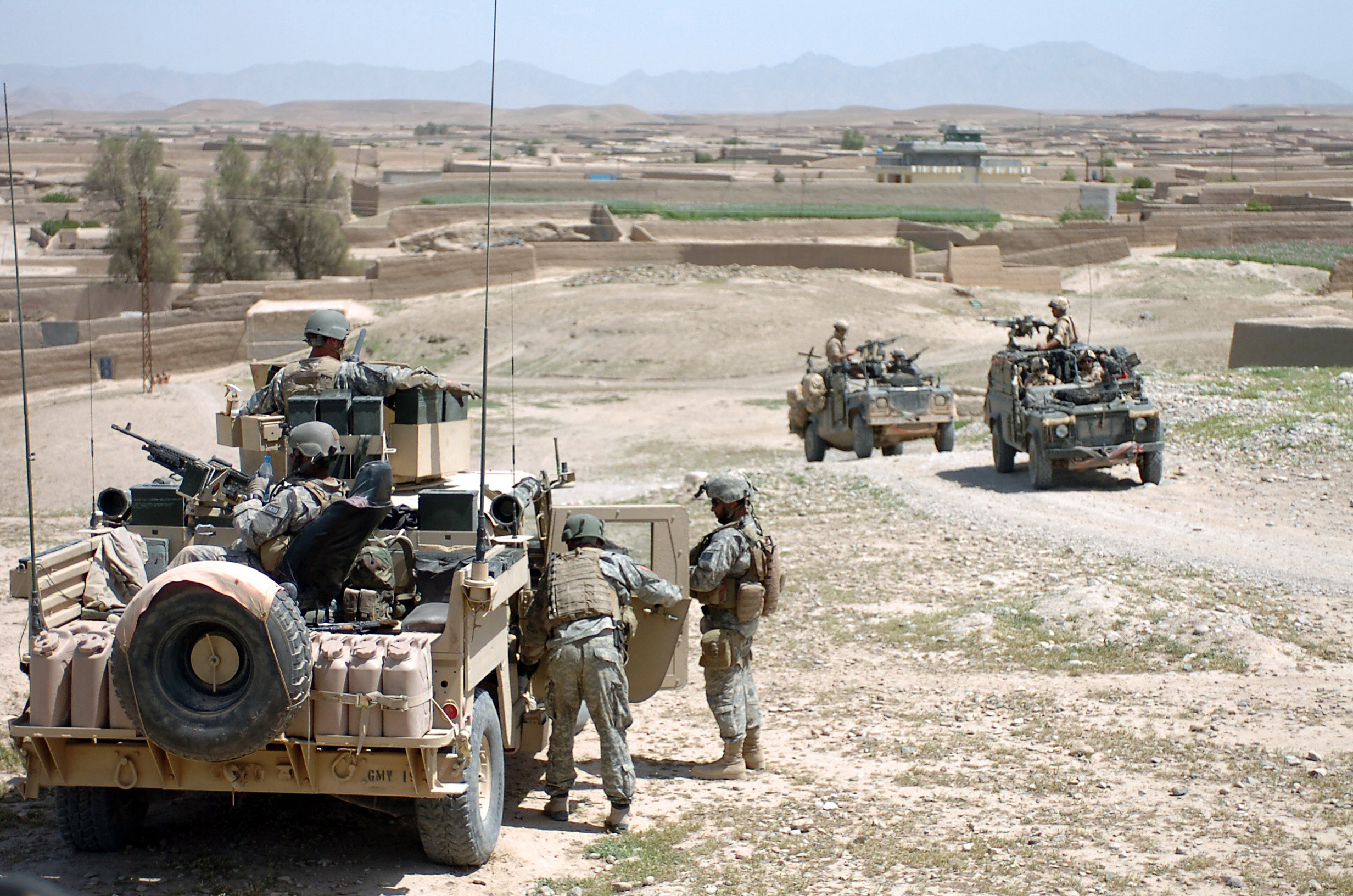
US Army Special Forces operators with their GMV and British soldiers in their two Land Rovers take a tactical pause during a combat patrol in the Sangin District area of Helmand Province, Afghanistan at the Helmand province campaign in 2007.

The Ground Mobility Vehicle (GMV) is a U.S. Special Operations Command, (US)SOCOM program, initially modifying Humvees into several variants for use by the United States special operations forces (SOF).

Its design is mostly based on lessons learned during Operation Desert Storm in Iraq, after an initial program, post 1985, for specialized HMMWVs for desert strike operations: the Desert Mobility Vehicle (DMV), or "Dumvee". GMV crews like to call them "gun trucks".

The GMV program is superseded by the GMV 1.1, based on the General Dynamics Flyer 72. It is understood that under a seven-year indefinite delivery / indefinite-quantity (ID/IQ) contract (August 2013–August 2020), SOCOM wishes to procure 1,297 GMV 1.1s — to replace its 1,072 first generation, Humvee-based GMV units.

== History ==
The GMV was developed based on U.S. special operation forces Humvees deployed to the Middle East. The program was initially meant to provide equipment related to mountainous deployment.

== Design ==
The GMV has a cruising range of 275 miles (443 km) at over 70 mph (110 km/h) for operations behind enemy lines with only occasional resupply. GMVs feature an open rear, where an enclosed cabin would normally be. This flat bed area is used to store all the fuel, ammunition, rations, repair tools, electronic gadgets and other supplies that the mission requires.

Each GMV can carry from 1 operator to at least 10 of them in full combat gear and still has room for enough fuel with other supplies to operate in desert areas for 10 days. The crew can modify the GMV to meet their specific needs.

=== Improvements ===
The GMV program made changes in the Humvee's chassis and tires to make them more compatible for off-road work. The tires used were more rugged and have a central tire inflation system. Heavy suspension was also included as an upgrade, giving a ground clearance of 16.8 inch / 42.672 cm. There was an increased payload capacity to 2½ tons (unarmored M998 / M1025 GMVs)

A V8 6.5L turbocharged diesel engine that ran at 190 horse power (142 kW) at 3,400 rpm was installed. Extra fuel tanks were available to improve on the GMV's range. Sometimes multiple M243 smoke grenade launchers are installed.

An open bed was used for improved storage space and access with a winch for towing other vehicles (up to 4,200 pounds/1,905.088 kg). Armor plating and ballistic glass were also available to better protect the vehicle and its occupants.

== Variants ==
Early models were based on the M1025 Humvee chassis. Later models of GMVs included versions based on the M1113 chassis. Another model based on the M1165 HMMWV can be fitted with armor kits to create an 'up-armored' GMV with additional armor plating, ballistic glass and an optional gun shield around the top gunner's turret.

Variants consist of the following:

- GMV-S – Army Special Forces
- GMV-R – 75th Ranger Regiment
- GMV-N – Navy SEALs
- GMV-T / GMV-SD / GMV-ST – Air Force Special Operations Command (AFSOC)
- GMV-M – Marine Corps Special Operations Command (MARSOC)

== Replacement ==
In June 2012, the United States Special Operations Command requested proposals for a replacement for the GMV, called GMV version 1.1. By contrast to converted Humvees, the vehicle needed to be lighter, faster, more easily transportable by air, sea, and land, and contain next generation communications and computing equipment. The vehicle was expected to be selected by the end of 2012, with production beginning in 2013. 1,300 of the new vehicles are to be in service by 2020.

AM General, one of many contenders for the contract, pitched an upgraded GMV. In August 2013, General Dynamics was selected as the winner of the contract, potentially valued at $562 million. The vehicle will replace 1,092 GMVs.
