= Willys MB =

U.S. military vehicle of WWII ("Jeep")

Willys MB Ford GPW Truck, 1/4‑ton, 4×4, command reconnaissance
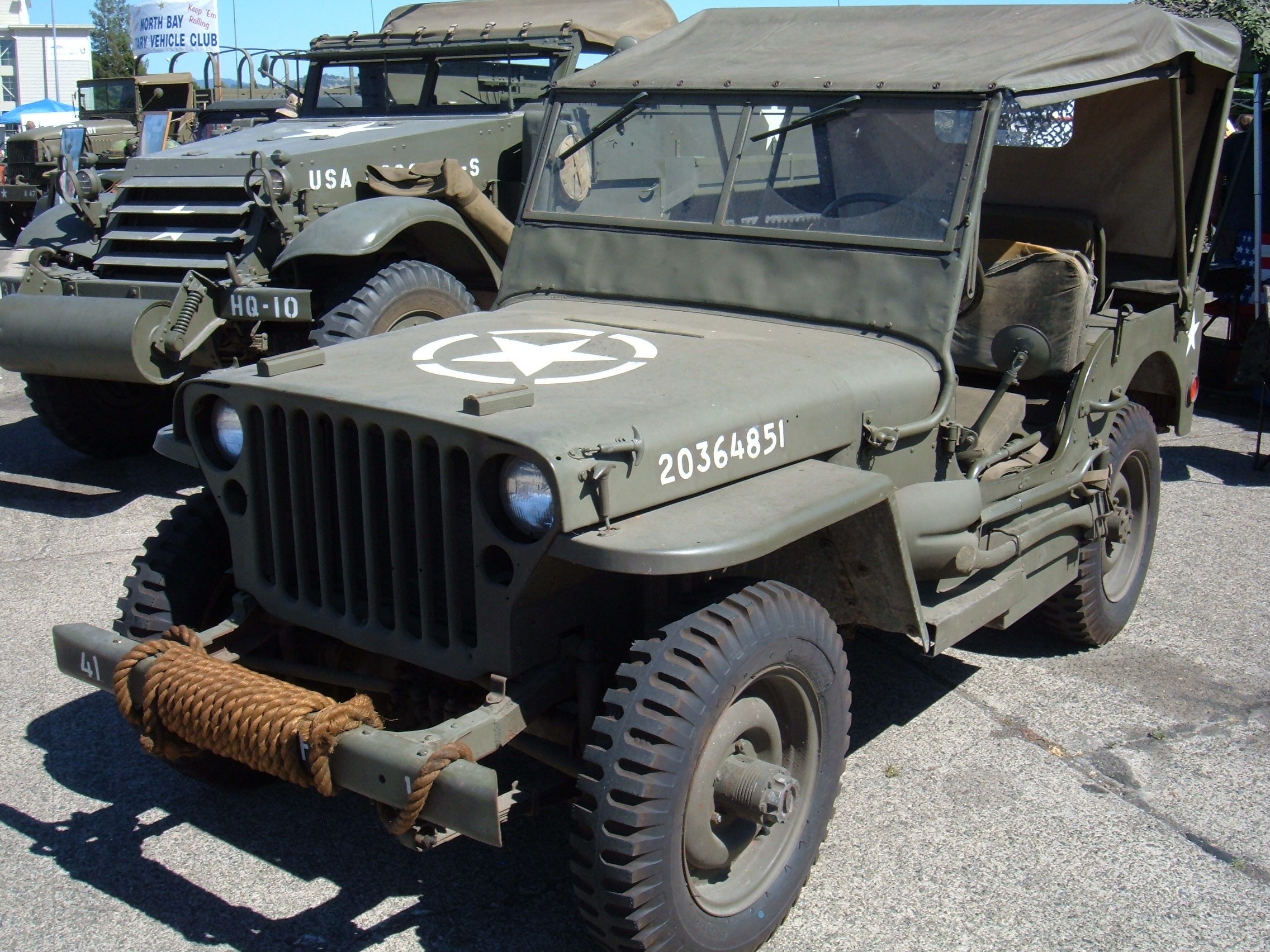
- Type: 1/4 ton (Note: Quarter-ton (about 225 kg) was the nominal off-road payload rating; the payload supported was much higher.) 4×4 utility truck
- Place of origin: United States

Service history
- In service: 1941–2000
- Used by: United States and its allies of World War II
- Wars: World War II; Korean War; Various post 1945 conflicts

Production history
- Designer: Multiple parties and persons: American Bantam Co. Harold Crist et al. (Note: Other core Bantam engineers were Ralph Turner, Frank McMillan, and Chet Hemphling.); Karl Probst (subcontractor); Ford Motor Co. Dale Roeder (Pygmy design team leader / chief engineer); Willys-Overland Motors; Delmar "Barney" Roos; U.S. Army; Many – firstly from Camp Holabird
- Designed: 1940 through early 1942
- Manufacturer: Willys-Overland (MB); Ford (GPW)
- Produced: 1941–1945
- No. built: WWII total: More than 647,925 *, including early production units; Willys MB: Over 359,489 *; Ford GPW: Over 277,896 *; * ACM (Auburn/ American Central Manufacturing) fabricated 3/4 of all U.S. 1/4-ton jeep bodies (Note: Auburn Central Manufacturing, later American Central, made all of Willys' jeep body-tubs, starting with the first 1,555 MA pre-production models, and continuing throughout the war, and also for the first years of CJ Civilian Jeeps production. Ford initially built their own jeep bodies but switched to using ACM tubs about halfway through their total production. It wasn't until after then that the last small differences between the Ford and Willys body-tubs were ironed out, and all 1/4-tons finally got truly identical bodies.)
- Variants: Ford GPA "Seep": 12,778

Specifications (MB and GPW same)
- Mass: 2,453 lb (1,113 kg) curb weight (with engine fluids and full fuel); 2,337 lb (1,060 kg) dry weight
- Length: 132 in (3.35 m)
- Width: 62 in (1.57 m)
- Height: overall, top up: 69 3/4 in (1.77 m) reducible to 52 in (1.32 m)
- Crew: 3 to 4
- Main armament: Designed to mount .30 or .50 caliber machine guns swiveling on a post between front seatbacks
- Engine: 134 cu in (2.2 L) inline 4 Willys L134 "Go Devil"; 60 hp (45 kW; 61 PS) gross / 54 hp (40 kW; 55 PS) net
- Power/weight: 49 hp/ST (40.3 kW/t)
- Payload capacity: 1,200 lb (540 kg) on-road; 800 lb (360 kg) cross-country
- Transmission: 3-speed × 2-range transfer case
- Suspension: Live axles on leaf springs front and rear
- Ground clearance: 8 3/4 in (22 cm)
- Fuel capacity: 15 US gal (12 imp gal; 57 L)
- Operational range: 300 mi (480 km)
- Maximum speed: 65 mph (105 km/h) (Note: Although the dashboard caution plate indicated only 60 mph (97 km/h) in 3rd high.)

The Willys MB (/ˈwɪlɪs/ WIL-iss) and the Ford GPW, both formally called the U.S. Army truck, 1/4‑ton, 4×4, command reconnaissance, commonly known as the Willys Jeep, (Note: The company owner and founder of Willys-Overland, John North Willys, always pronounced Willys as /ˈwɪlɪs/, like in Bruce Willis, as opposed to "Willy's" or "Willies".) Jeep, or jeep, and sometimes referred to by its Standard Army vehicle supply number G‑503, (Note: According to its United States Army Ordnance Corps Supply Catalog designation, 'G-number', or SNL nr. – a group number for ordering vehicles, weapons, munitions, or parts, based on a Standard Nomenclature List (SNL).) were highly successful American off-road capable, light military utility vehicles. Over 600,000 were built to a single standardized design for the United States and the Allied forces in World War II, from 1941 to 1945. This also made it the world's first mass-produced four-wheel-drive car, built in six-figure numbers. (Note: After the first four-wheel-drive vehicles, built in 5-figure numbers: the American WWI trucks of 1 1/2‑ton and 3‑ton payload rating: the FWD Model B and Jeffery/Nash Quad trucks. For WWII, Nazi Germany built several models of 4×4 cars in low five-figure numbers. The German 1930s Einheits-PKW der Wehrmacht program produced a range of standardized 4×4 cars for the Wehrmacht (Nazi-Germany's military), in weight-classes up to that of the Dodge WC series; and during the war, VW made some 15,000 amphibious 4x4 Schwimmwagens that were lighter than the U.S. WWII 1/4‑ton jeep. Germany's best-known counterpart to the jeep, the VW Kübelwagen, was rear-wheel drive, and fewer than 1/10th as many were made.)

The 1/4-ton jeep became the primary light, wheeled, multi-role vehicle of the United States military and its allies. With some 640,000 units built, (Note: Including almost 9,000 non-standard, pre-production jeeps made by Ford, Bantam and Willys in 1941, and almost 13,000 amphibious Ford GPAs) the 1/4‑ton jeeps constituted a quarter of the total military support motor vehicles that the U.S. produced during the war, (Note: Counting 2,382,311 trucks across the four main payload classes, plus 116,394 tractor trucks (34,295 military, and 82,099 commercially procured), and some of the 224,272 other vehicles, for a total of roughly 2.6 million units.) and almost two-thirds of the 988,000 light 4WD vehicles produced, when counted together with the Dodge WC series. Large numbers of jeeps were provided to U.S. allies, including the Soviet Union at the time. Aside from large amounts of 1 1/2- and 2 1/2‑ton trucks, and 25,000 3/4‑ton Dodges, some 50,000 1/4‑ton jeeps were shipped to help Russia during WWII, against Nazi Germany's total production of just over 50,000 Kübelwagens, the jeep's primary counterpart.

Historian Charles K. Hyde wrote: "In many respects, the jeep became the iconic vehicle of World War II, with an almost mythological reputation of toughness, durability, and versatility." It became the workhorse of the American military, replacing horses, other draft animals, and motorcycles in every role, from messaging and cavalry units to supply trains. In addition, improvised field modifications made the jeep capable of nearly any function soldiers could think of. Jeeps were adopted into the militaries of countries all over the world, so much so that they became the most widely used and most recognizable type of military vehicle in history.

Dwight D. Eisenhower, the Supreme Commander of the Allied Expeditionary Force in Europe in World War II, wrote in his memoirs that most senior officers regarded it as one of the five pieces of equipment most vital to success in Africa and Europe. (Note: The others being the bulldozer, the DUKW amphibious truck, 2 1/2‑ton trucks, and the Douglas C-47 Skytrain transport airplane.) General George Marshall, Chief of Staff of the US Army during the war, called the vehicle "America's greatest contribution to modern warfare." In 1991, the MB Jeep was designated an "International Historic Mechanical Engineering Landmark" by the American Society of Mechanical Engineers.

After WWII, the original Jeep continued to serve in the Korean War and other conflicts until it was updated in the form of the M38 Willys MC and M38A1 Willys MD (in 1949 and 1952 respectively), and received a complete redesign by Ford in the form of the 1960-introduced M151 jeep. Its influence, however, was much greater than that — manufacturers worldwide began building jeeps and similar designs, either under license or not — at first primarily for military purposes, but later also for the civilian market. Willys turned the MB into the civilian CJ Jeeps, starting with the CJ-2A in 1945, producing the world's first mass-produced civilian four-wheel drive. The "Jeep" name was trademarked and grew into a successful and highly valued brand.

The success of the jeep inspired both an entire category of recreational 4WDs and SUVs, making "four-wheel drive" a household term, and numerous incarnations of military light utility vehicles. In 2010, the American Enterprise Institute called the jeep "one of the most influential designs in automotive history." Its "sardine tin on wheels" silhouette and slotted grille made it instantly recognizable, and it has evolved into the currently produced Jeep Wrangler still largely resembling the original jeep design.

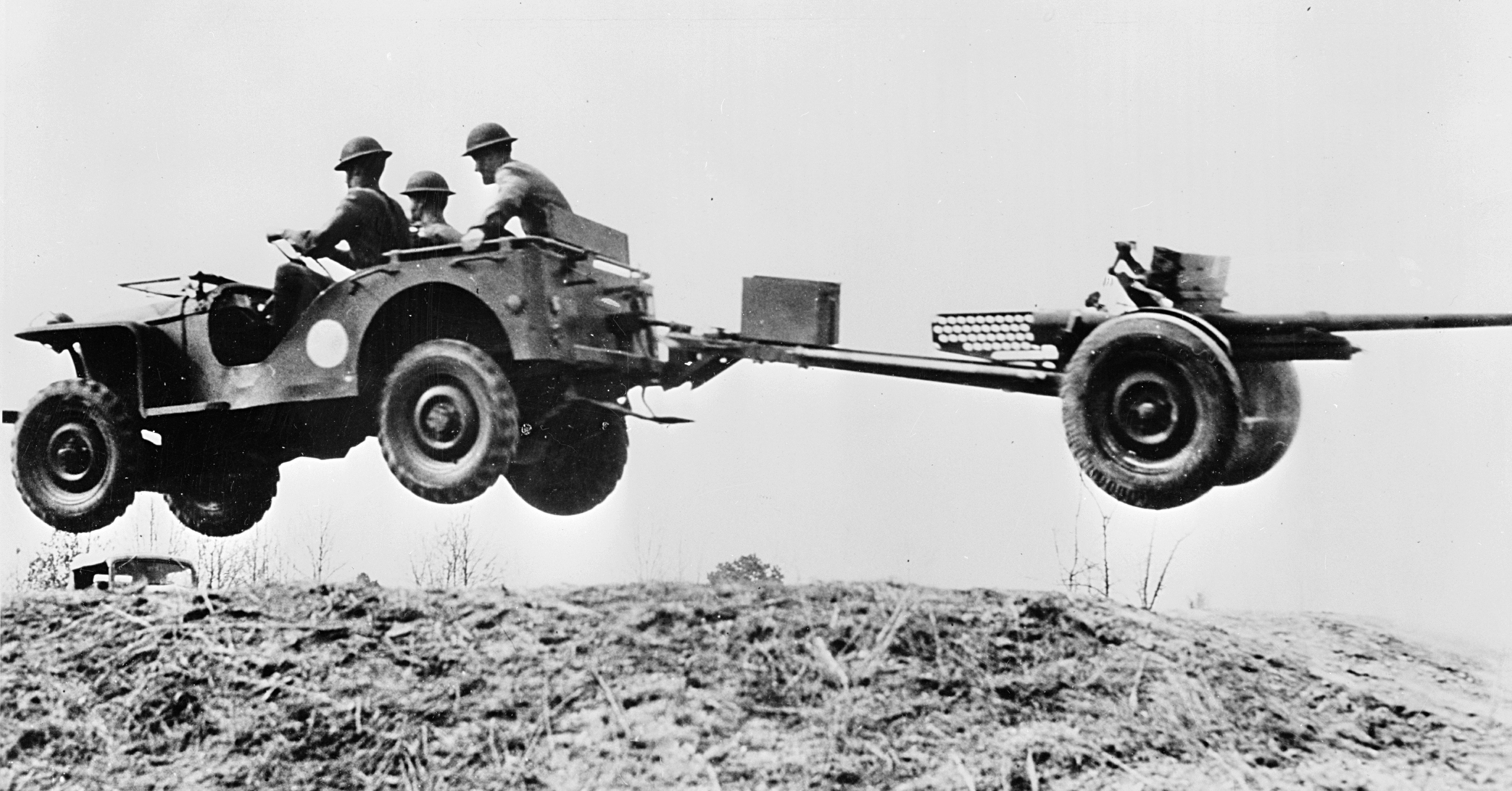
A 1941 Bantam achieving total lift-off, loaded with a 3-man crew, and towing a 37mm anti-tank gun. "Flying Jeep" photos like this one inspired posters and perhaps the 'Leaping Lena' nickname.

== History ==
=== The design challenge and achievement ===
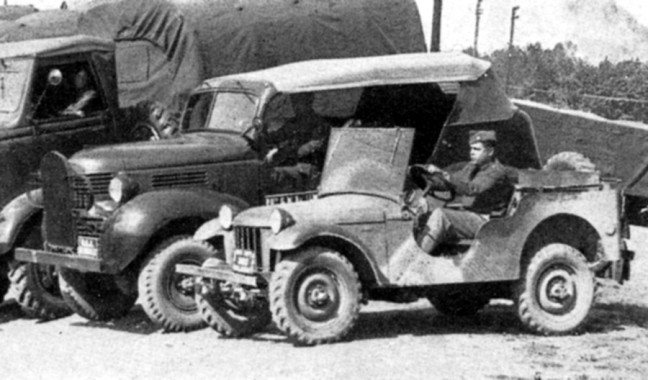
Bantam's first prototype, shown in front of the already new for 1940, "light" half-ton, 4×4 Dodge VC-1 Command Car, graphically shows the radically new 1/4‑ton concept.

By 1940, U.S. policies had put it at a stark disadvantage compared to Nazi Germany's aim of building a standard fleet of Wehrmacht (German armed forces) motor vehicles. Since 1933, German industry could produce only Wehrmacht-approved trucks. The U.S. Quartermaster's only significant success for standardization, through late September 1939 Army Regulations on tactical trucks, (Note: Regulation AR 850-15, 29 Sep '39, released after Germany had invaded and conquered Poland in September 1939.) was that the War Department limited procurement to just five payload chassis types (categories), from 1/2‑ton to 7 1/2‑ton—but only "models produced commercially by two or more competing companies..." The Army was still to use "commercially standard" trucks and parts, with only minor modifications, like brush-guards, tow-hooks, etc. Specially designed vehicles or a standardized truck fleet were still ruled out. "This policy was intended to assure speedy production at the outbreak of war, regardless of the maintenance and spare parts problems that might develop later." The new rules more or less allowed the Army to order, in late 1939, the U.S. military's first ever light, quantity-produced 4×4 trucks: the half-ton Dodge G-505 VC-series trucks, delivered in the first half of 1940. Although so well received, that the preproduction order of under 5000 units was followed by nearly 80,000 additional units ordered for 1941, these rigs were still nowhere near small, light and nimble enough for the jobs that both the Infantry and Ordnance branches required it for. By contrast, Germany had already completed a development program to produce off-road capable "Standardized Military Vehicles" (the Einheits-PKW der Wehrmacht), from 1933 to 1938, which had already yielded a fleet of tens of thousands of standardized vehicles for the German Army. Moreover, lessons were learned, and a second program to develop a cheap, light, nimble multipurpose off-roader, the Volkswagen Kübelwagen, had already started in 1938. America's military faced a severe catch-up in time and knowledge. In June 1940, the U.S. Army began a race to produce a lightweight, four-wheel-drive cross-country vehicle capable of carrying equipment and personnel across rough terrain.

The idea of the Jeep originated with the infantry, which needed a low-profile, powerful vehicle with four-wheel drive, and it was turned over to commercial companies (chiefly Bantam, Willys, and Ford) to deliver—the development repeatedly being described as a "design by committee." In fall 1941, Lt. E.P. Hogan of the U.S. Army Quartermaster Corps wrote: "Credit for the original design of the Army's truck 1/4‑ton, 4×4, may not be claimed by any single individual or manufacturer. This vehicle is the result of much research and many tests." Hogan credited both military and civilian engineers, especially those working at the Holabird Quartermaster Depot. Nevertheless, Bantam is credited with inventing the original 1/4‑ ton Jeep in 1940. (Note: To be distinguished from the U.S. Army's first ever series-produced, light 4‑wheel drive trucks, which were half-ton rated – developed by Dodge, and supplied to the Army earlier that same year as the Dodge VC series – and which were also called "jeeps" by soldiers.)

However, Willys' advertising and branding during and after the war aimed to make the world recognize Willys as the Jeep's creator. Although first designed and shown on Ford's first 1/4‑ton, Willys engineer Delmar G. Roos was the first who submitted and was awarded design patent 136819, assigned to Willys-Overland which describes the characterizing Jeep nose design, having a slightly tapered front clamshell hood, its vertical grille and slats, and integrated headlights into the front fascia, which distinguished it from the original Bantam design. (Note: The stamped sheet-steel grille with nine vertical slots, extending sideways to envelop the headlights, was also an innovation by Ford – copied by Willys, to reduce production costs on the Jeep.) When Willys first applied to trademark the "Jeep" name in February 1943, Bantam, Ford, and other companies objected, because of their contributions to the Jeep and the war effort. Although many different companies advertised their patriotic efforts to producing the 1/4‑ton Jeeps—including Ford, featuring their own GPW Jeeps in their ads—nobody took their claims as far as Willys-Overland, and the U.S. Federal Trade Commission (FTC) opened a case, charging Willys-Overland with misrepresentation in their advertising and news claims, on 6 May 1943. According to The New York Times, the FTC ruled that Willys did not perform the "spectacular achievement" (Note: (Willys advertising wording)) of creating, designing and perfecting the "jeep" together with U.S. Army Quartermaster officers, but that: "The idea of creating a 'jeep' was said by the FTC ... to have been originated by the American Bantam [Co.] of Butler, PA '[with U.S. Army officers] and to have been [conceived and] developed by that company." Willys appealed this ruling, and after a five-year investigation, in 1948 the FTC again ruled that "Willys was unfairly taking credit for the creation and was thus using unfair methods of competition. The FTC ordered Willys to stop claiming they were the sole creator of the Jeep."

Some 70 years later, in a late 2012 article, the Defense Acquisition Research Journal (Note: A scholarly, peer-reviewed journal published by the Defense Acquisition University (DAU)) still called the jeep design "...a product of a massive team effort, including all three manufacturers as well as Army engineers, both military and civilian." (Note: Citing Vanderveen (1971) 'The Jeep', Wells (1946) 'Hail to the Jeep: A factual and pictorial history of the WWII Jeep', and Hogan (1941); pages not given.)

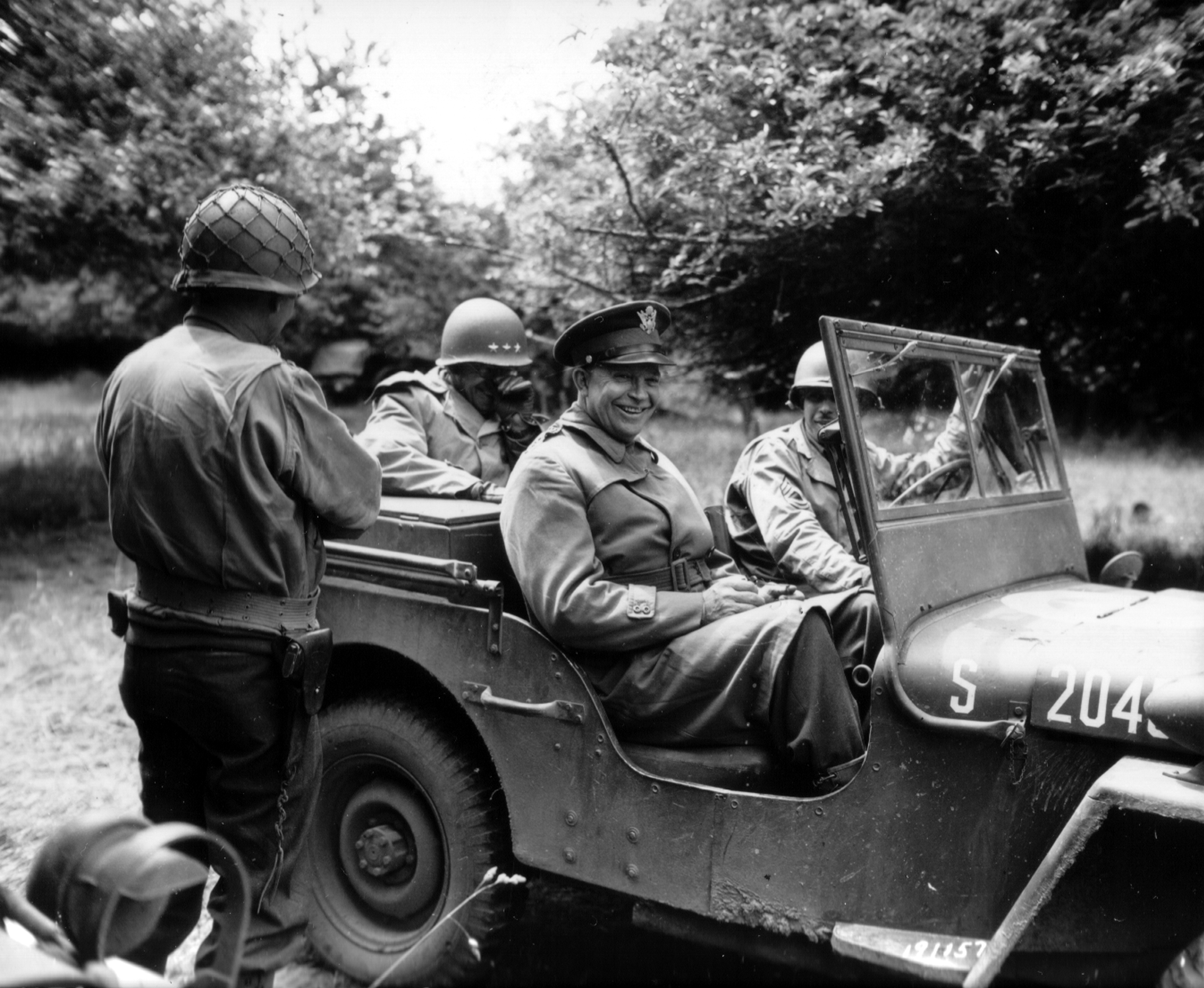
General Dwight D. Eisenhower, here in his Jeep in summer 1944, wrote that the Jeep was "one of the six most vital" U.S. vehicles to win the war

Moreover, in 2015, the Pennsylvania General Assembly unanimously adopted a non-controversial House Resolution (382): "...commemorating the 75th anniversary of the Bantam Jeep, invented and originally manufactured in Butler, Pennsylvania," therein explicitly resolving that Bantam of Butler, PA, invented the Jeep, calling it "one of the most famous vehicles in the world," were the only party to deliver a working prototype of a light four-wheel drive reconnaissance car within the required seven weeks, which withstood 30 days of Army testing at Camp Holabird, then further developed that car, and manufactured 2,675 jeeps, before losing further production contracts to Willys and Ford Motor Company, for fear that Bantam would not be able to ramp up production to 75 jeeps a day, and after the Army handed Ford and Willys the blueprints of Bantam's detailed technical drawings—though Bantam proved highly capable and productive during the war, entrusted with manufacturing torpedo-motors and more.

However, on 7 April 1942, U.S. patent 2278450 for the WWII jeep, titled "Military vehicle body" had been awarded to the U.S. Army, which had applied for it, listing Colonel Byron Q. Jones as the inventor on the patent, though he had performed no work on the design of the vehicle. Filed on 8 October 1941, stating in the application that "The invention described herein, if patented, may be manufactured and used by or for the Government for governmental purposes without the payment of any royalty thereon," the patent relates to a "small car vehicle body having convertible features whereby it is rendered particularly desirable for military purposes" and describes the purpose as being "a convertible small car body so arranged that a single vehicle may be interchangeably used as a cargo truck, personnel carrier, emergency ambulance, field beds, radio car, trench mortar unit, mobile anti-aircraft machine gun unit, or for other purposes."

=== First motorizations and World War I ===
For centuries, horses served in armed conflicts for reconnaissance, communications, and pulling loads. Still, after the start of the 20th century, motorcycles were the first motor vehicles eagerly adopted by the military, either to replace mounted/ridden cavalry horses, or to motorize infantry.

World War I armies relied on marching men, horses, and railways for movement, but its new technologies introduced motor vehicles: the first tanks, armored cars, and artillery tractors. Motorcycles were the most prolific motor tools in the Allied arsenal.

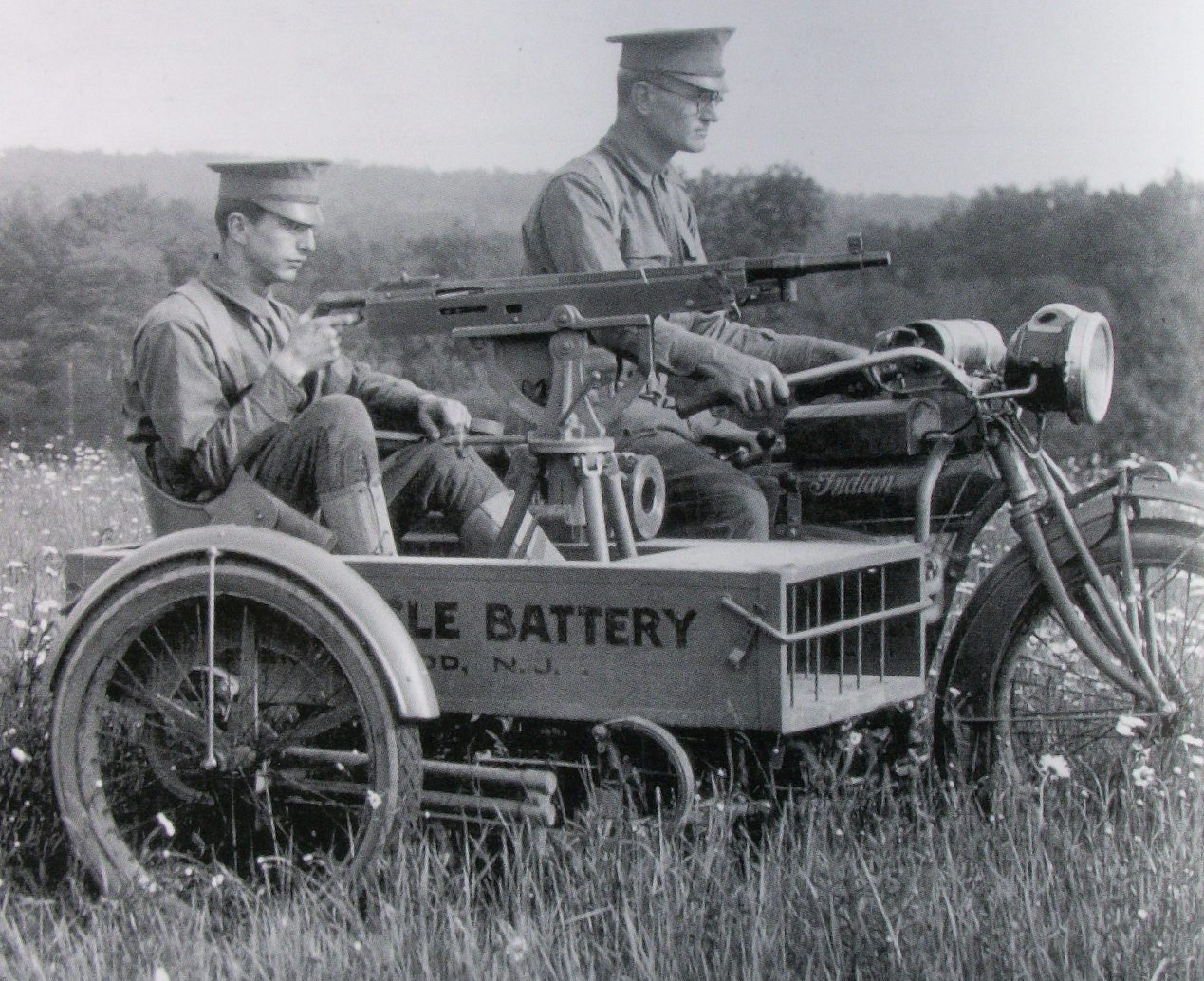
U.S. Indian motorcycle and sidecar, with M1914 Colt Machine Gun, 1917

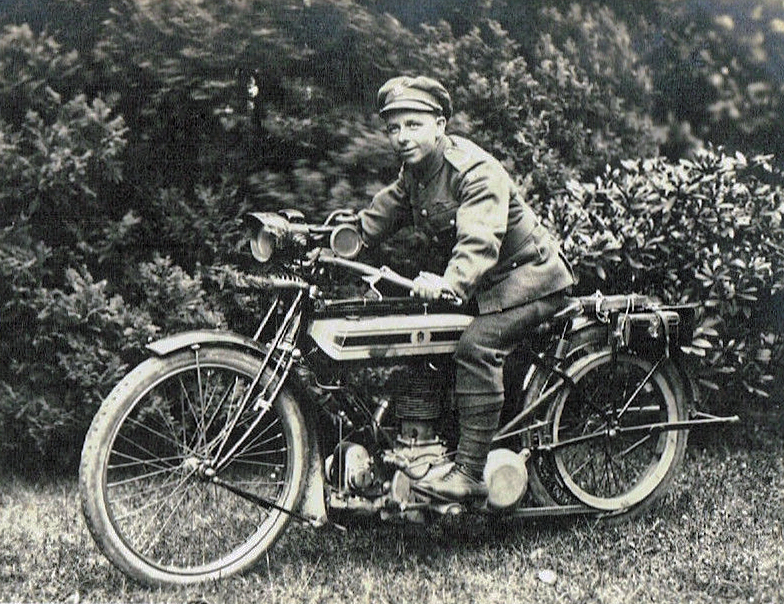
British military motorcycle dispatch rider, 1914 World War I

Cavalry, mounted infantry, scouts, and messengers could now be mobilized in combat with much greater speed, agility, and near-tireless machines, exactly what was wanted for relaying critical orders, getting munitions to machine guns, and scouting miles ahead of advancing units. The quick and nimble motorcycle, "ridden hard through shot and shell to secure victory," has made itself irreplaceable in specific roles on the battlefield to this day. Motorcycles also had severe limitations. One could be fast on a decent road. However, many roads were still so bad that the U.S. already had a Good Roads Movement in the late 19th century, as increased usage of bicycles required improving the surfaces of existing wagon and carriage trails. Motorcycles of the era were not ideal; only the best motorcyclists could endure a muddy battlefield trail, control the bike, and keep it from stalling, damaging, or flipping over; driver training was also costly in time and money. They had poor off-roading ability and lacked payload capacity. Adding a sidecar provided more stability, but payload and cargo space remained minimal, and having only one powered wheel out of three still meant the combination often got stuck. Royal Page Davidson used Charles Duryea's patents to modify the chassis, adding machine guns and an armor shield, in 1898. (Note: Davidson was the leading pioneer of armored military vehicles in the U.S. of his time.)

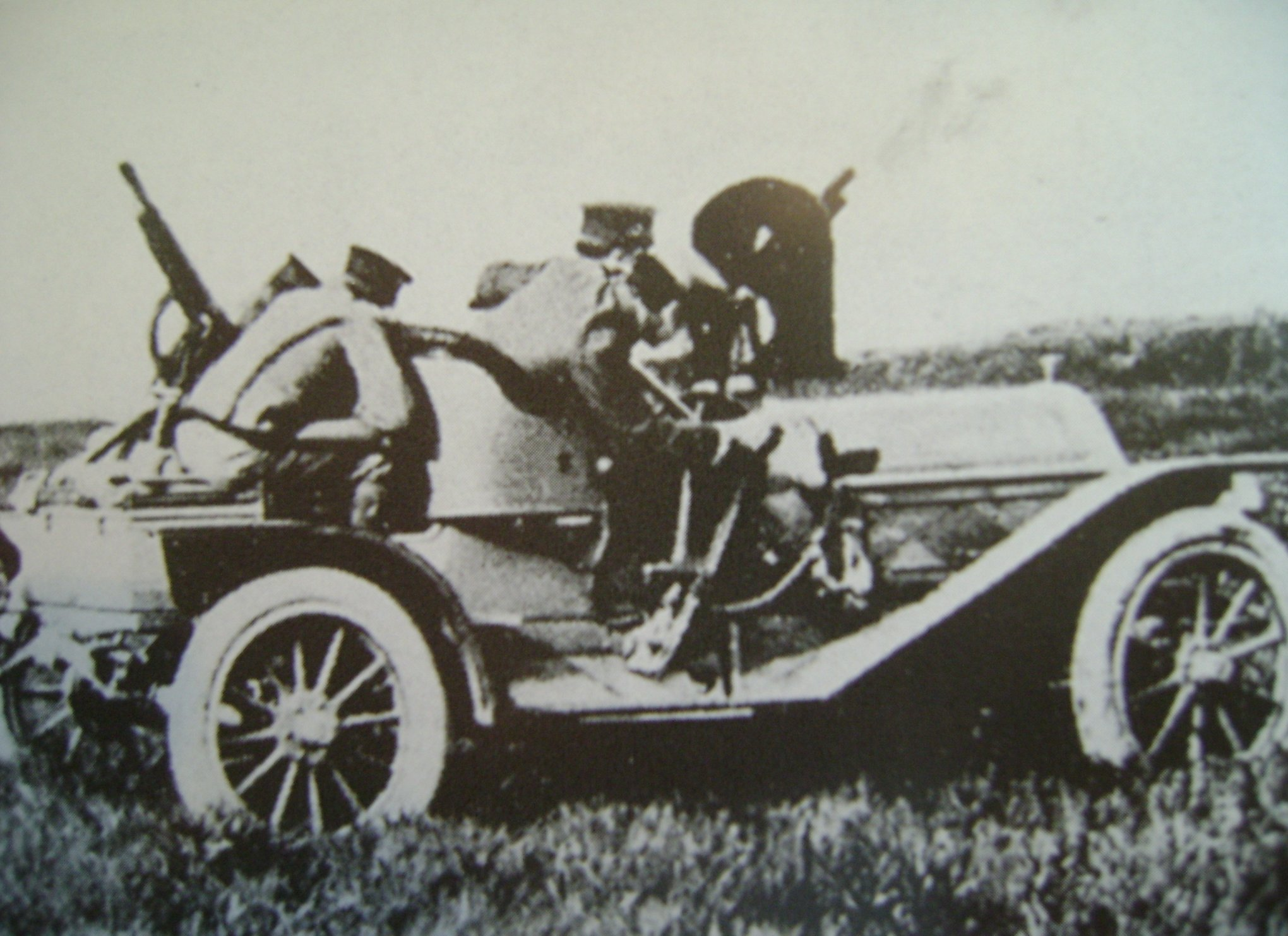
Colonel Davidson anti-aircraft semi-armored Cadillac, 1909

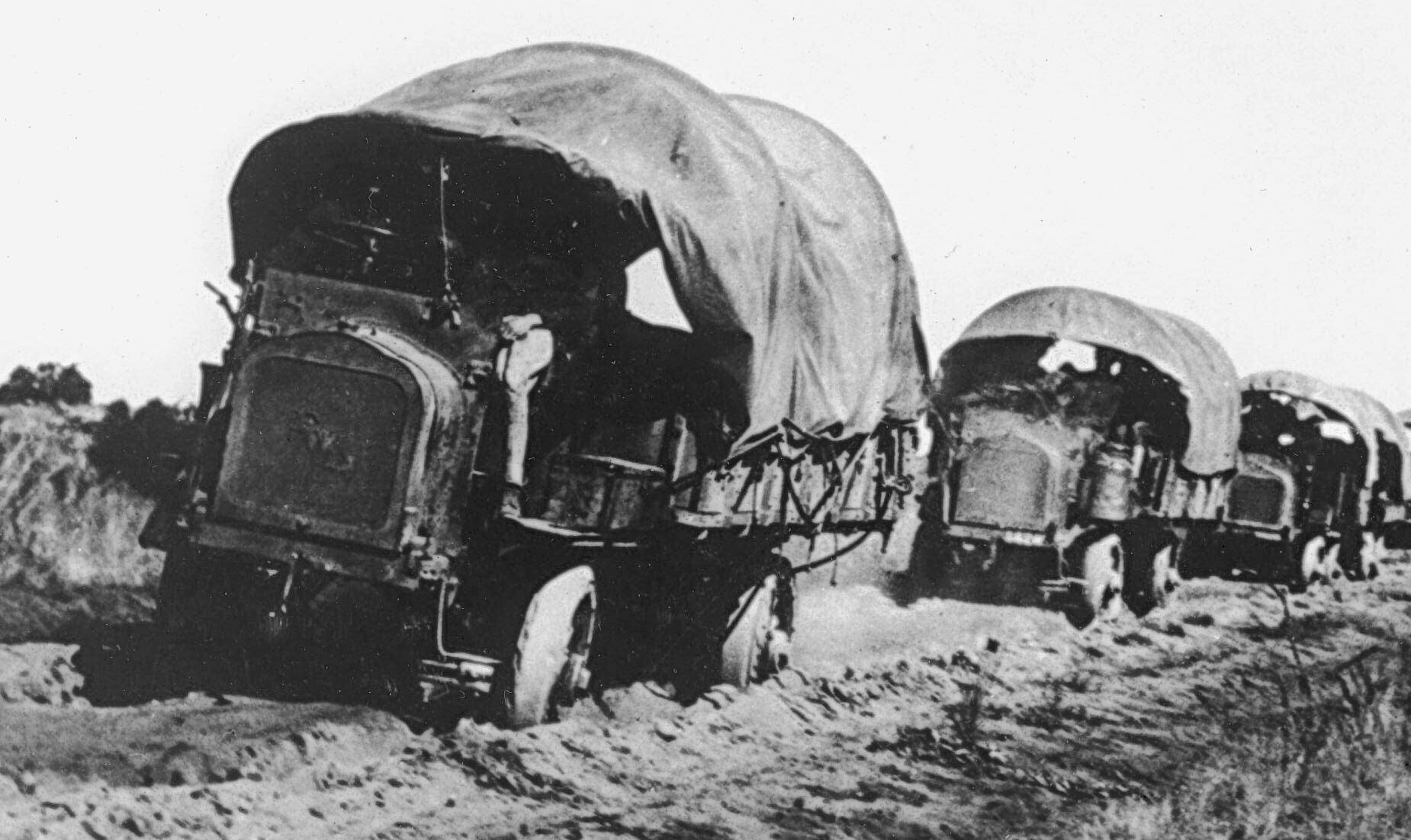
A convoy of 4×4 U.S. FWD Model B trucks in a mud and ruts road, 1916 Mexican Expedition note FWD logo on grille

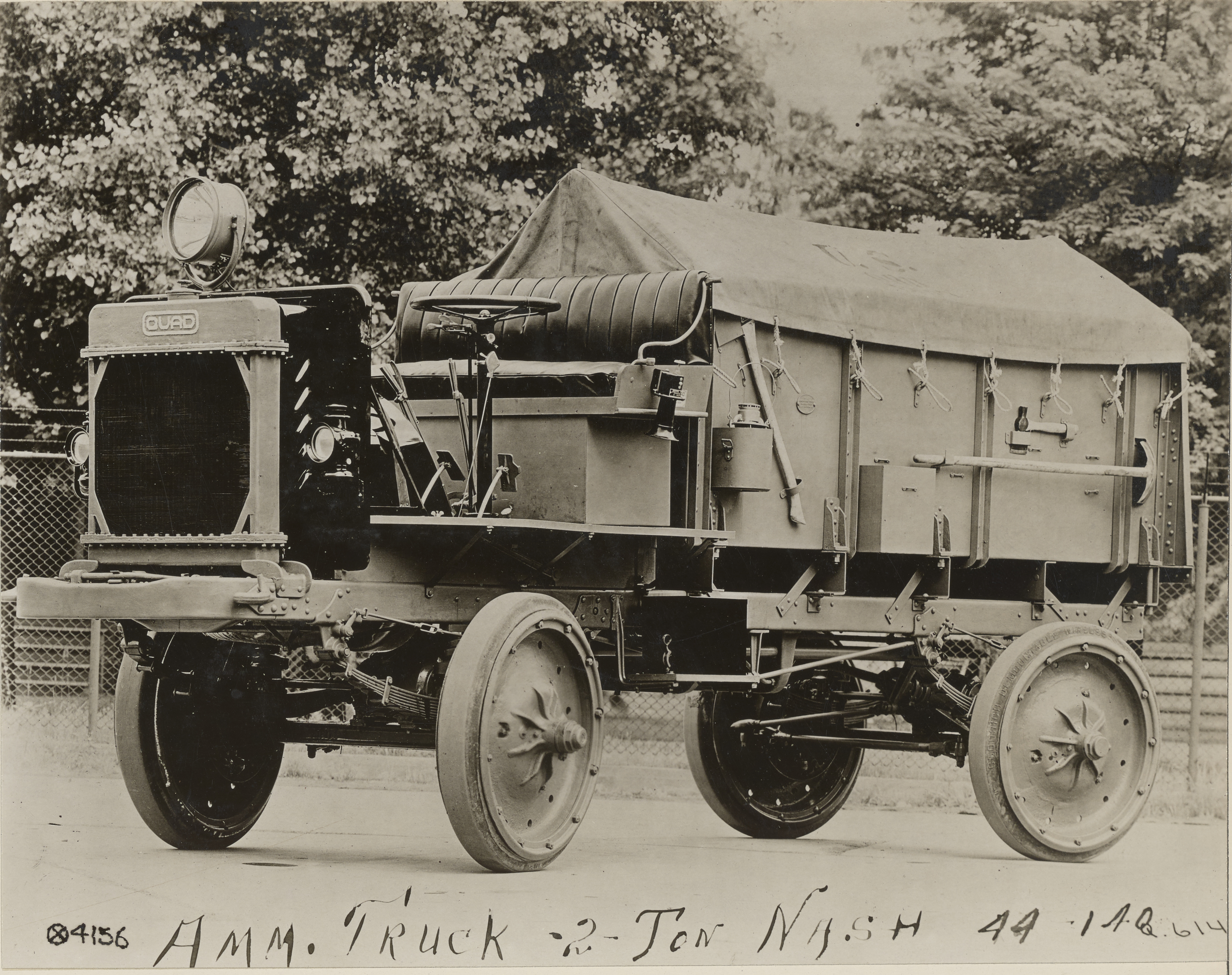
Nash Quad 2‑ton ammunitions truck, 1918

At the same time, the arrival and growing use of automobiles led various individuals to pioneer vehicle trips across the U.S., followed by the first transcontinental trips by convoys of vehicles. After the U.S. Army purchased its first truck in 1907, of 5-ton payload capacity, in the late summer of 1913, the Army Medical and Quartermaster Corps (QC) took a 3/4-ton QC field-truck, on a 922 mi (1,484 km) multi-leg experimental trek through Alaska for the state's Road Commission—both to try the truck's bad-road supply and maintenance abilities as well as test the state of several important overland connections in the rough territory. 1915 followed the first successful transcontinental motor convoy, traveling the entire Lincoln Highway, from New York City to the Panama–Pacific World Exhibition in San Francisco, taking four months—for making a film about it. Starting in 1916, the Quartermaster Corps was servicing over 100 "motor trucks," of as many as 27 "varieties", and in March that year, the U.S. Army decided to form its first two motor companies, to be used immediately in the Pancho Villa Expedition in Mexico, starting 14 March 1916. One company got 27 four-wheel drive, 2‑ton, Jeffery off-road Quad trucks. The other got 27 heavy-duty, 1 1/2‑ton, long wheelbase, rear-wheel drive White trucks. The U.S. War Department procured the vehicles as rolling chassis, which the manufacturers had to expedite to El Paso, Texas. The Quartermaster Depot supplied the wagon bodies for the chassis. The most suitable truck capacity found by the Quartermaster General for Army use to be 1 1/2‑ton, matching both the country roads nature, the strength of bridges, as well as the existing troop supply system, at the time also using standard 1 1/2‑ton, four-mule wagons.

Meanwhile, World War I had been raging in Europe since 1914. More than five years before, Henry Ford had launched his Model T. "... Its speed, durability, stamina, and ease of maintenance (compared to a horse) had already won over many civilians," and British and French forces also wanted them. Ford, an isolationist, would not sign a contract with an overseas government, but local dealers sold over 50,000 Fords to European forces, who militarized them locally, most famously into ambulances. When the U.S. entered the war in 1917, Ford sold directly to his country, delivering another 15,000 cars before peace was signed.

Britain, France, and Russia were already buying American-made four-wheel-drive trucks from the Four Wheel Drive Auto Company, and Jeffery/Nash Quads, because on the muddy roads and European battlefields, they would not get stuck all the time.

The United States procured thousands of motor vehicles for its military, including some 12,800 Dodges, plus thousands of four-wheel-drive trucks: 1 1/2‑ton Nash Quads, and 3- and 5-ton FWD trucks. General John J. Pershing viewed horses and mules as acceptable for the previous three U.S. wars, but in the new century, his cavalry forces had to move quickly, with more range and more personnel. He was the first to deploy motorcycles, in the Mexican Border War, predominantly a cavalry campaign over vast regions of the Southwest, where Harley-Davidson motorcycles provided to the Army gave the U.S. the advantage over the horse-mounted Mexicans. The U.S. Army was so pleased with further innovations, like a sidecar as a platform to mount machine-guns, that the U.S. procured many more motorcycles than 4WD trucks for World War I. "Entire infantry units were mobilized on motorcycles, and they also provided an ideal way to rapidly deploy machine gun crews into position. Medical units used them to evacuate wounded on stretcher-equipped sidecars, and to return medical supplies and ammunition."

"By the war's end, the whole world saw the horse as hopelessly outclassed." Nevertheless—crucially—using four-wheel drive still remained tied to heavier trucks, of 1 1/2-ton to 5-ton capacity. Throughout World War I, no light four-wheel-drive vehicles existed.

=== Interbellum tests, and formulating the need for a standardized, 4×4, quarter-ton ===
Interwar experimental vehicles

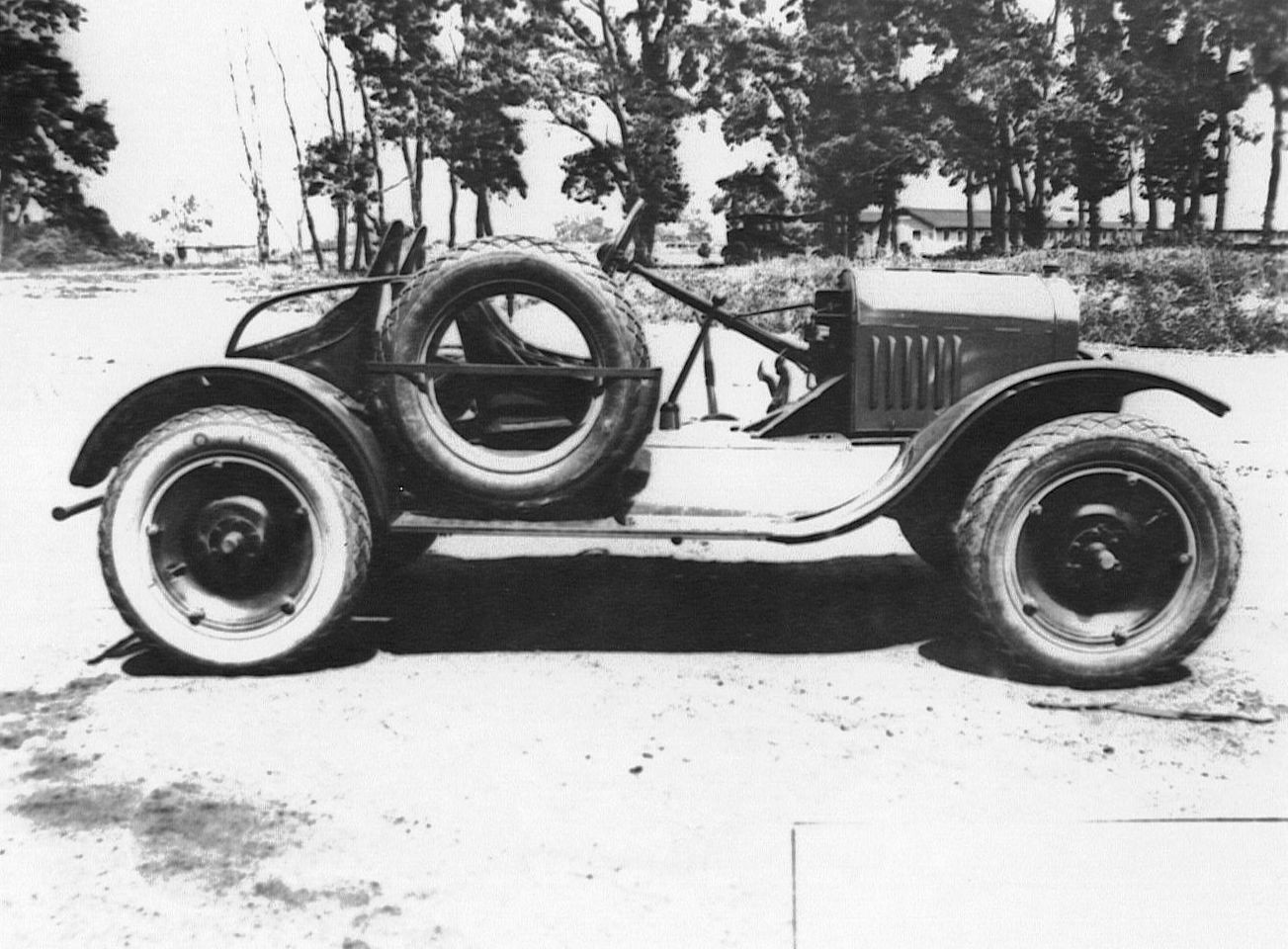
1923 Ford 4×2 Reconnaissance Car, much tested for cross-country mobility

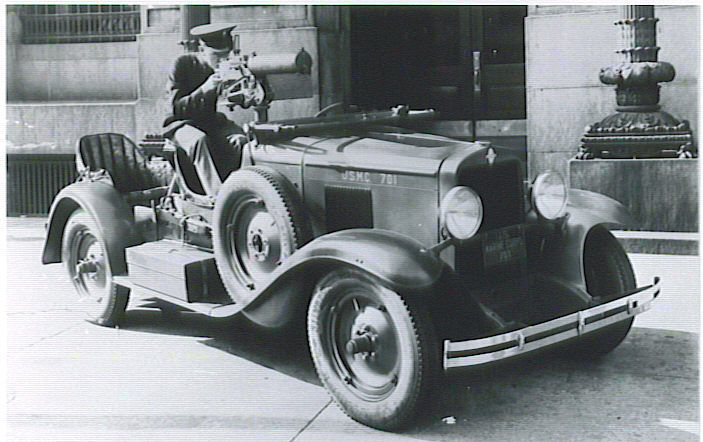
USMC converted 1929 half-ton, 4×2 Chevrolet, armed scout one-off

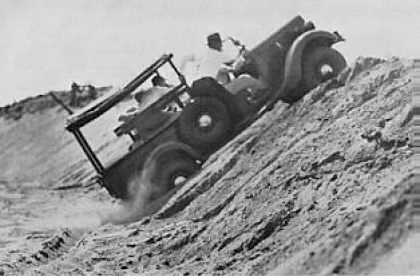
Marmon-Herrington converted Ford half-ton truck, c. 1936 – sometimes called the "grandfather of the Jeep"

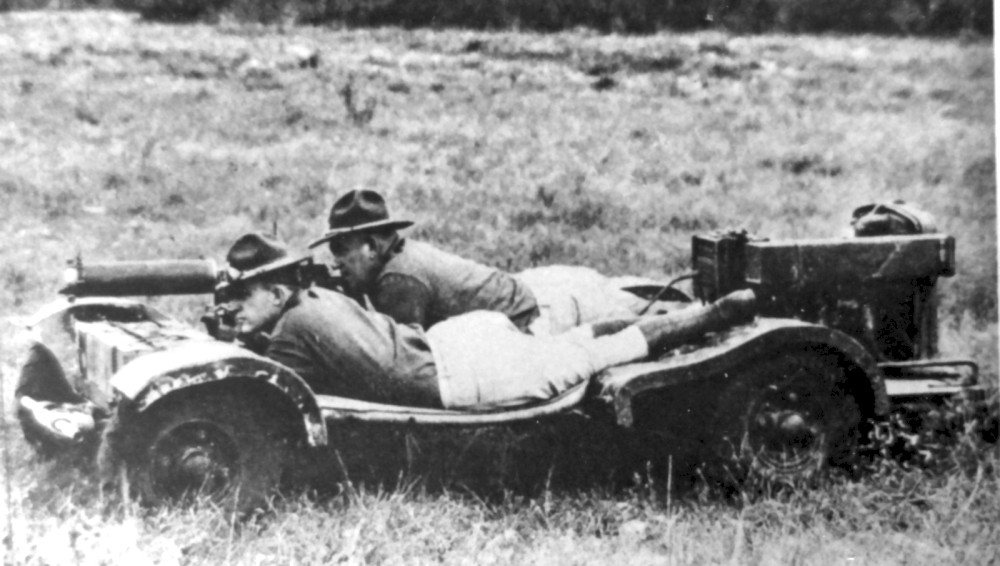
Howie-Wiley machine gun carrier, 1937, Fort Benning Infantry School

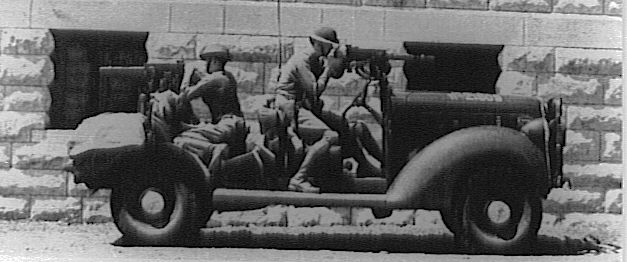
1938 Marmon-Herrington 4×4 Ford reconnaissance car with two .30-caliber machine guns

Immediately after World War I, people considered the further and future use of motor vehicles. In many roles, motorized vehicles had replaced horses and other draft animals, but several roles still required better or more specialized vehicles. In 1919 already, the U.S. Army Quartermaster Corps recommended the acquisition of a new kind of military vehicle, "... of light weight and compact size, with a low silhouette and high ground clearance, and possess the ability to carry weapons and men over all sorts of rough terrain." The U.S. Army started looking for a small vehicle suited for reconnaissance and messaging, while at the same time searching for a light cross-country weapons carrier.

However, after World War I, the United States had a large public debt, and the military had many leftover war vehicles, so vehicle budgets were drastically cut. During the first half of the interwar period, the Roaring Twenties, despite a booming economy, United States non-interventionism and neutrality policies were supported by both elite and popular opinion, to the point of isolationism, and no real budgets were allocated. Then, the Wall Street crash of 1929, and the following Great Depression resulted in economic austerity policies lasting until the end of the 1930s, thus curtailing any development of new military vehicles, like a light 4WD car.

At the same time, there was a drive for standardization. By the end of World War I, U.S. forces overseas had 216 different makes and models of motor vehicles to operate, both foreign and domestic, and no sound supply system to keep them running.

Various light motor vehicles were tested—at first motorcycles with and without sidecars, and some modified Ford Model Ts. But what was needed was a very light, small, battlefield utility vehicle to replace motorcycles (with or without sidecar)—more user-friendly to control, but just as easy to get in and out of. In the early 1930s, the U.S. Army experimented with a bantam-weight "midget truck" for scouts and raiders. A 1,050 lb (480 kg), low-slung mini-car with a pick-up body, provided by American Austin Car Company, was shown in a 1933 article in Popular Mechanics magazine. One of the pictures showed that the vehicle was light enough to be man-handled—four soldiers could lift it from the ground entirely. But it was still only rear-wheel drive.

After 1935, when the U.S. Congress declared World War I vehicles obsolete, procurement for "remotorization of the Army" gained more traction, but pre-war, peacetime budget restrictions still meant that the U.S. Comptroller General imposed open bidding on every additional, or even incremental procurement. Each time, the Army was forced to award the contract to the lowest bid that met requirements and specifications, often to different makers. However, saving a small percentage initially, on the procurement, overall proved "penny wise, pound foolish" because it led to problematic diversity of the fleet, requiring too much training of operators and mechanics for maintenance and repairs, and an unmanageably large supply of non-interchangeable spare parts: "The commanding officer at Holabird reported in 1935 that, the 360 different models of vehicles now in the Army ... involve nearly a million items of spare parts which neither the War Department nor any other authority can control." This was bad for logistics in times of war, both in terms of supply chains, as well as hindering troops' mobility by blocking the ability to repair one vehicle by scavenging parts off another. And the Army could still only get multi-axle drive on "tactical" trucks, "requiring the greatest battlefield mobility."

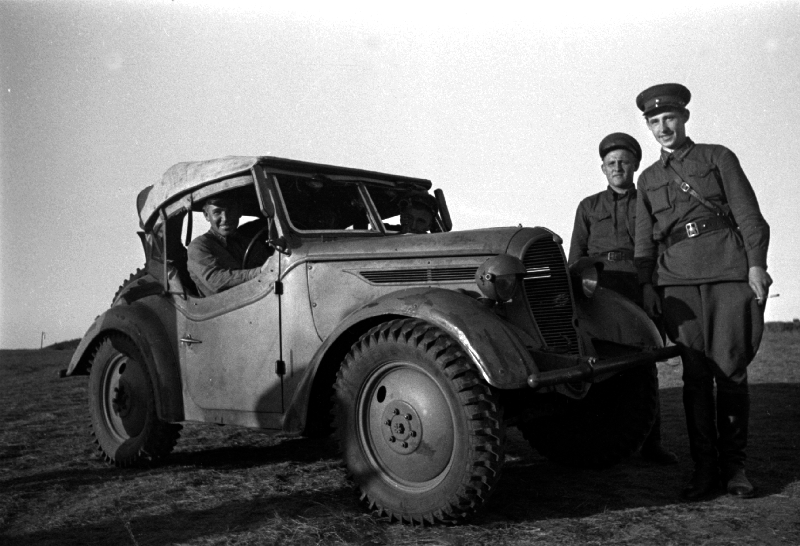
Japan-fielded 1935 Kurogane Type 95 4×4 scout car (captured at the 1939 Battle of Khalkhin Gol)

Meanwhile, in Asia and the Pacific, Japan had invaded Manchuria in 1931 and was at war with China from 1937. Its Imperial Army used a small, 2,425 lb (1,100 kg), three-man crew, four-wheel-drive car for reconnaissance and troop movements, the Kurogane Type 95, produced in limited numbers from 1936.

In 1937, Marmon-Herrington presented five 4×4 Fords, and American Bantam (previously American Austin) once again contributed, delivering three Austin-derived roadsters in 1938. The U.S. Army itself had also built an experimental light, low-profile scout and gun mover, the Howie-Wiley machine gun carrier, ordered by General Walter Short, then Assistant Commander of the Army's Infantry School at Fort Benning, Georgia, and built by Captain Robert G. Howie and Master Sergeant Melvin C. Wiley. Completed in April 1937, with a driver and a gunner lying prone, operating a .30 caliber machine gun, the vehicle was nicknamed the "belly flopper."

In France, the project has been developed and in production since 1937. The Laffly V15 can be considered the French Jeep. One thousand two hundred of these four-wheeled vehicles were produced before the debacle of 1940.

By 1939, the U.S. Army began standardizing its general-purpose truck chassis types by payload rating, initially in five classes from 1/2 to 7 1/2 short tons (0.45 to 6.80 t). The Quartermaster Corps saw that the Army needed truck chassis to be standardized in crucial basic functional 'types' (body models), and within "payload capacity" classes. Additionally, some essential features could not be equipped by the QC on commercial trucks after procurement. Cross-country capabilities, like increased ground clearance and multi-axle drive, had to be designed and built into the trucks from the factory. The Quartermaster Corps Technical Committee concurred, and in June 1939 requested the Chief of Staff's approval, to start standardizing truck chassis and bodies procured for the Army into five payload classes: 1/2‑ton, 1 1/2‑ton, 2 1/2‑ton, 4‑ton, and 7 1/2‑ton and all tactical trucks had to have (part-time) all-wheel drive capability. Furthermore, to achieve the needed level of standardization, the Quartermaster General urged trucks should be bought en masse from there on. Acting Chief of Staff, George C. Marshall, approved the procurement policy in the summer of 1939. The Quartermaster Corps also wanted to require the truck industry to use dimensionally interchangeable components, but further standardization measures were not approved until 1940.

However, in 1940, the Army revised the categories. For the first time, a quarter-ton truck tactical (4×4) chassis class was introduced, at the bottom of the range, and the 1/2‑ton chassis was supplanted by a 3/4‑ton payload class.

By the eve of entering World War II, the United States Department of War had determined it needed a 1/4‑ton, cross-country reconnaissance vehicle. Although 1/2‑ton 4×4s had outperformed 1 1/2‑ton 4×4 trucks during testing in 1938, the half-ton 4×4 trucks—both from Marmon-Herrington Ford, and the 1940 Dodge VC series—still proved too large and heavy, and insufficiently agile off-road. Anxious to have a quarter-ton truck in time for America's entry into World War II, the U.S. Army solicited proposals from domestic automobile manufacturers. Recognizing the need to create standard specifications, the Army formalized its requirements on 11 July 1940 and submitted them to 135 U.S. automotive manufacturers.

=== Development start – Bantam Reconnaissance Car ===
In the early 1930s, the Infantry Board at Fort Benning had become interested in the British Army's use of the tiny Austin 7 car in a reconnaissance role, and in 1933 received a car from the American Austin Car Company in Pennsylvania, which built them under license. Ever since then, their devout on-the-road salesman and (Washington) lobbyist, ex-military Harry Payne, kept approaching many U.S. Army and Defense branches and officers, hoping to sell the idea of a small, lightweight reconnaissance car to someone in the Army or Defense and get some much-needed government contract business for his company. And Payne kept pushing while American Austin had gone bankrupt and its assets were reincorporated into American Bantam. In 1938, American Bantam again loaned three much-improved cars to the Pennsylvania National Guard for trials during summer maneuvers, which were received as reliable, economical and practical.

During the first days of September 1939, World War II had escalated in Europe, with Hitler's invasion of Poland, and the Nazi German forces showed the world a new, highly mobile form of warfare, dubbed ‘Blitzkriegʼ, or lightning war, by a coordinated combination of fast-moving tanks and motorized infantry, (self-propelled) artillery, and air support. In response, President Franklin Roosevelt made an emergency proclamation on 8 September 1939. It authorized the U.S. to expand both the regular Army and the National Guard. The War Department was also authorized to spend an additional $12 million on motor transport.

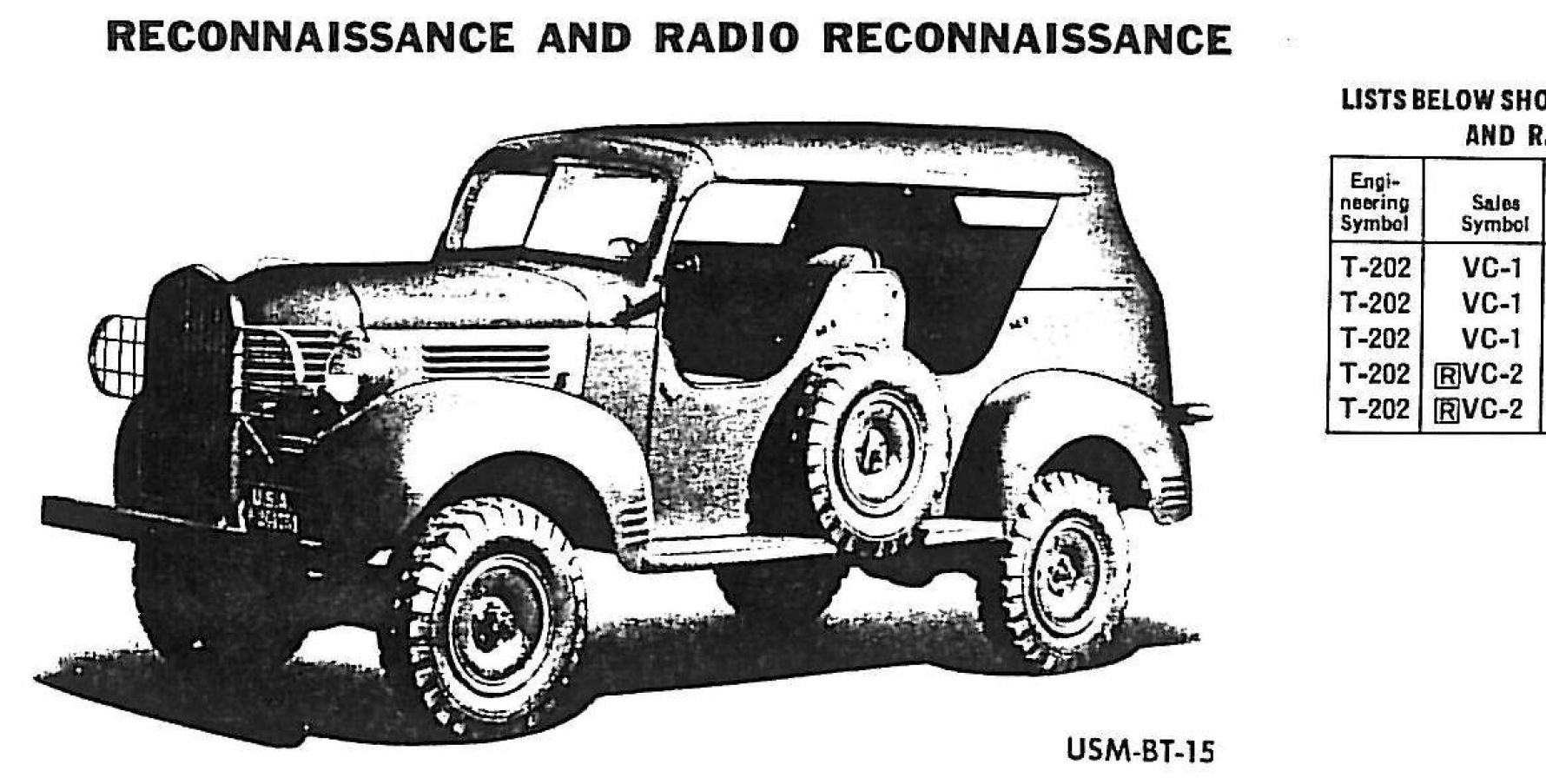
The 1940 Dodge G-505 VC-series (Command Car shown) were the first light U.S. military 4WD vehicles, bought in production quantity, (Note: Earlier three- and four-figure orders for 1 1/2‑ton 4x4 Dodges were all marked as "experimental", but not the orders for the 1940 VC-series.) during WWII, and for years nicknamed "jeeps" by the soldiers.

The Army then ordered the U.S. military's first-ever production quantity of light four-wheel drive vehicles: going on 5,000 1/2‑ton, 4×4 Dodge G-505 VC series tactical trucks, which arrived by the Spring of 1940. Until that point, only a few third-party aftermarket modified four-wheel drive 1/2‑ton trucks, mainly Marmon-Herrington derived Fords, had been bought after 1935 for testing, but the prevailing belief amongst military higher-ups and Congress was that all the extra four-wheel-drive hardware would make any truck lighter than a 1 1/2‑ton payload model, so much heavier that the weight-gain would cancel out any benefits gained from adding four-wheel drive. But after the 1/2‑ton 4×4 Dodges arrived, two decisions were made: greatly more of these 1/2‑ton Dodges were ordered (some 80,000 for the 1941 model year revisions), but also, in June 1940, the Army's tactical trucks payload categories were revised. For the first time, the Army introduced a quarter-ton 4×4 truck chassis class, and just above that, the 1/2‑ton chassis were going to be supplanted by a 3/4‑ton class.

Bantam officials met with the chiefs of Infantry and Cavalry and suggested a contract to further develop military versions of their light car. But in June 1940—as a collaboration with the Quartermaster Corps (QMC), still responsible for U.S. unarmored tactical military vehicles in 1940—the Ordnance Corps initiated a Technical (sub-)Committee, for the QMC to formulate a comprehensive, exact specification for this new, very lightweight, cross-country tactical vehicle, capable of carrying personnel and equipment across rough terrain. The committee included the now major Robert Howie, invited for his expertise, having actually built an ultra-light prototype infantry-support vehicle, officers representing the Quartermaster Corps, and the Army's using arms: Infantry, Cavalry, and the two Coast Guard divisions, as well as civilian engineers, mainly from Camp Holabird and Bantam. To begin with, the committee sent an Army delegation including Howie, and Camp Holabird vehicle testing engineers, to Butler, Pennsylvania, to visit American Bantam's factory, being invited to an extensive demonstration there, to evaluate their compact cars and production facilities. Once there, Howie stayed several days, and also Robert Brown, a Camp Holabird civilian engineer, who was instructed to disregard the presentation, but changed his mind after seeing it. Brown also stayed at the Bantam plant, where he and Howie worked out specifications for the proposed vehicle with Crist.

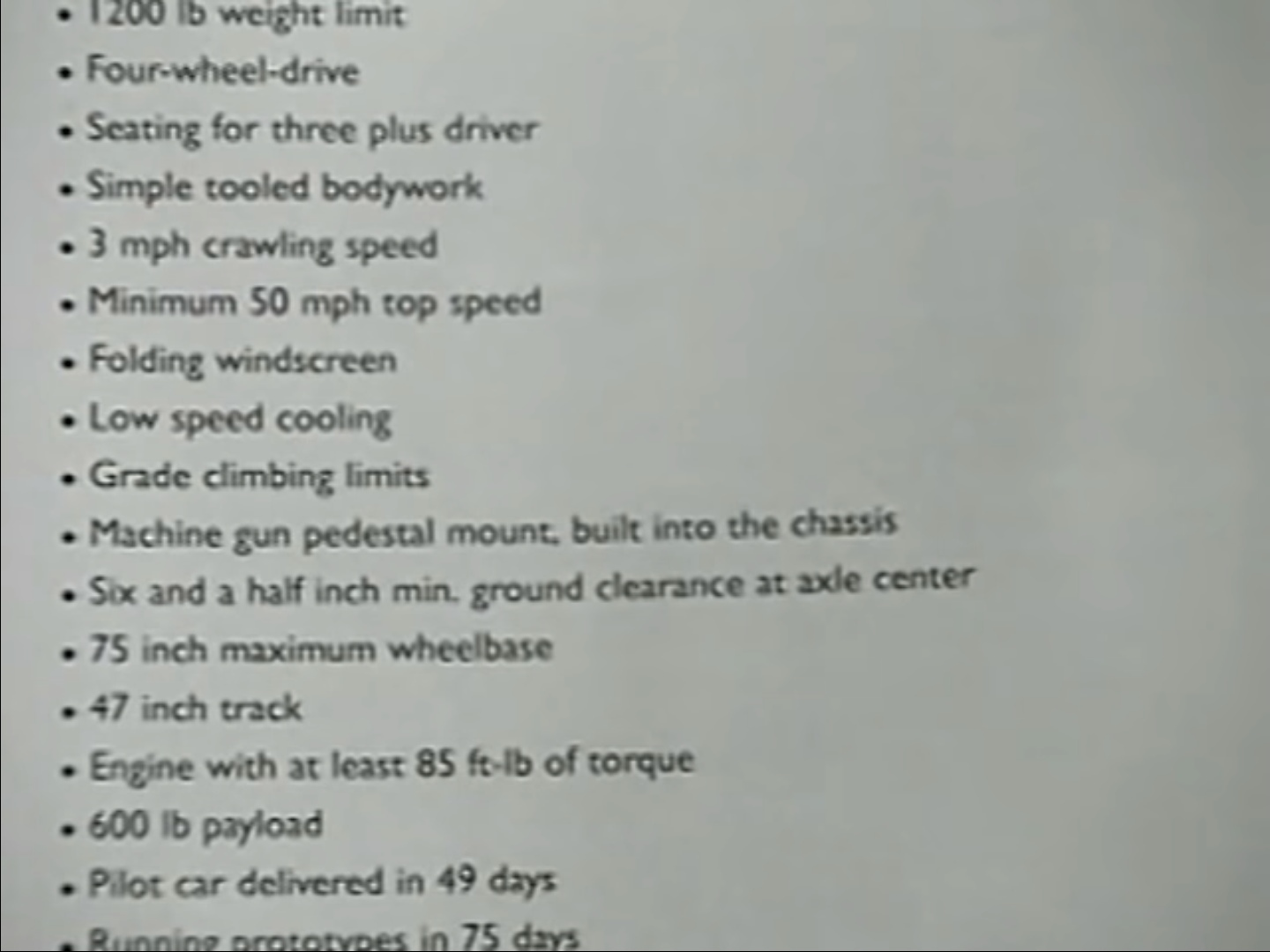
Initial 1/4‑ton truck specifications (Ordnance Technical Committee; 1940)

By the end of June 1940, with American Bantam's consultation, the Quartermaster Corps issued their initial specifications. They specified a part-time four-wheel-drive vehicle, with a two-speed transfer case, three bucket seats, a fold-down windshield, and blackout and driving lights, of just 1,200 lb (540 kg), with a payload up to 600 lb (270 kg), on a wheelbase no longer than 75 in (1.91 m) (the wheelbase of American Bantam's pickup truck), a maximum (collapsible) height of 36 in (91 cm) (three inches above the Howie-Wiley machine-gun carrier), and an engine and drivetrain, capable of smoothly pulling at speeds ranging from 3–50 miles per hour (4.8–80.5 km/h). Its body design was to be rectangular in shape, including a sketch drawing, handed to the Ordnance Technical Committee.

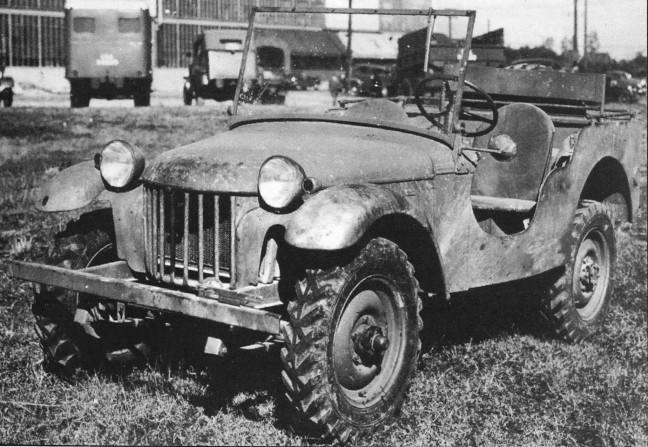
American Bantam's first Reconnaissance Car (BRC) prototype, "Old Number One" – note fully rounded front fenders

By now, the war was underway in Europe, so the Army's need was urgent and demanding. No sooner than July 1940, some 135 manufacturers of automotive or similar equipment were approached by a government letter to submit bids, to be received by 22 July, a span of just eleven days. In the first stage, the winning manufacturer(s) were given just seven weeks (49 days), from the moment of awarding the contract, to submit their first fully functional prototype and 75 days for completing 70 test vehicles in total. The Army's Ordnance Technical Committee specifications were equally stringent: the vehicle would be four-wheel drive, have a crew of three, on a wheelbase no longer than 75 in (1.91 m), later stretched to 80 in (2.03 m), and tracks no wider than 47 in (1.19 m). The height with the windshield folded down was also raised, to 40 in (1.02 m). The diminutive dimensions were similar in size and weight to American Bantam's compact truck and roadster models. It was now to carry a 660 lb (300 kg) payload and be powered by an engine capable of 85 lb⋅ft (115 N⋅m) of torque. The most daunting demand, however, was an empty weight of no more than 1,275–1,300 lb (580–590 kg). (Note: Sources differ on this.)

Initially, only American Bantam Car Company and Willys-Overland entered the competition. And only Bantam provided a proper set of technical drawings. Ford joined later, after being approached directly. Although Willys was the low bidder, Willys was penalized for needing more days to make a prototype, and the dollars penalty per extra day put Willys' price above Bantam's – earning them the contract, as the only company committing to deliver a pilot model in 49 days and 70 more pre-production units in 75 days.

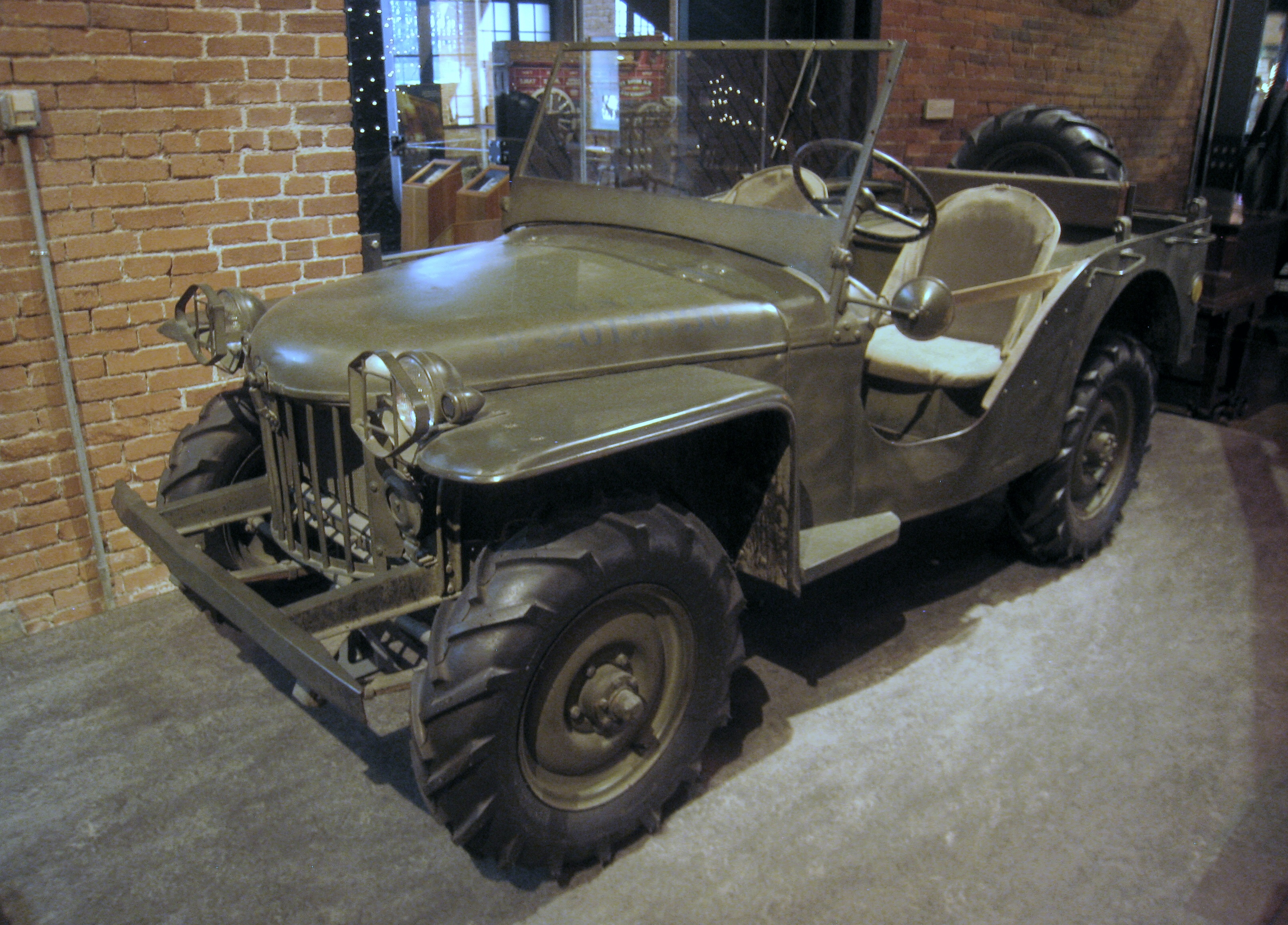
The further 70 Bantam Mk-II prototypes, often called 'BRC-60', (Note: But new research into identifying the earliest jeeps indicates that Bantam actually called these the '40 BRC (for 1940).) kept a round hood and grille, but square front fenders with short side steps. Shown #7, nicknamed "Gramps," owned by the Smithsonian museum.

American Bantam's chief engineer and plant manager, Harold Crist, (Note: By Spring 1940, Bantam was virtually bankrupt, most workers had been laid off, and what remained was a respectably sized factory and a skeleton crew of about 15 men, including management. What little business was still going on was mainly making spare parts and panels for repairs on Bantams, which was still on the road. Thus many of the remaining workers had a wide range of tasks.) was an experienced automobile engineer who had early-on worked on the first Duesenberg and been an engineer at Stutz Motor Company of Indianapolis for 18 years, worked a spell for Marmon, and then for Bantam from 1937 to 1942, drafted freelance Detroit designer Karl Probst to collaborate. Probst initially turned Bantam down, but agreed to work without pay after an Army request and began work on 17 July 1940. Probst laid out full design drawings for the American Bantam prototype, known as the Bantam Reconnaissance Car, or BRC Pilot, in just two days, and worked up a cost estimate the next day. Bantam's bid was submitted, complete with blueprints, on the 22 July deadline.

American Bantam had purchased the assets of American Austin Car Company from the bankruptcy court and had developed its own line of small cars and engine technology, free of licenses from the British Austin Motor Company. As the only small car manufacturer in the United States at the time, their design concept was initially to leverage their commercial off-the-shelf components as much as possible. Bantam adapted front sheetmetal body-stampings from its car line: the cowl, dashboard, and curvy front fenders.

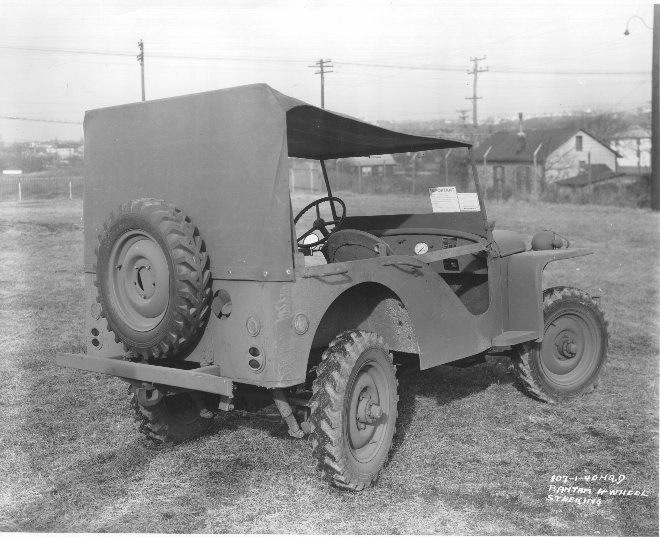
Conforming to specification, American Bantam delivered the last eight 1940 Mk. II prototypes with four-wheel steering.

However, once Brown returned to Camp Holabird, Crist reviewed their thinking and realized that the new vehicle would have to be mostly new, rather than simply a modified version of an existing Bantam model. He and others at Bantam immediately set about sourcing the right components: transmission, transfer case, driveshafts, and axles. Bantam's own engines made just 22 hp, so a 112 cu in (1.8 L) Continental four-cylinder, making 45 horsepower and 86 lb⋅ft (117 N⋅m) of torque was selected, mated to a Warner Gear transmission. Custom-built four-wheel drive-train components included the Spicer transfer case to send power to the front and rear axles. They were both Spicer-made, originally Studebaker Champion rear axles, but modified for four-wheel drive use.

Using off-the-shelf automotive parts where possible had helped to design the car and draw up its blueprints quickly. By working backward, Probst and American Bantam's draftsmen converted what Crist and a few other engineers and mechanics had rigged together in the factory back into drawings. The hand-built prototype was then completed in Butler, Pennsylvania, and basically untested, driven by Crist and Probst, to the Army vehicle test center at Camp Holabird, Maryland. It was delivered at 4.30 pm on 23 September 1940, just half an hour within the deadline. The American Bantam Pilot, initially called the "Blitz Buggy."

=== Enter Willys and Ford – early production Jeeps ===
Because the War Department deemed American Bantam unable to meet the Army's production needs or provide the required financial resources, it encouraged the other two bidders, Ford and Willys, to build their own pilot models for testing. Trials would determine the contract for the new reconnaissance car. While Bantam's prototype underwent testing at Camp Holabird from 27 September to 16 October, Ford and Willys' technical representatives were invited and given ample opportunity to observe the vehicle and study its performance. To expedite Ford and Willys' prototypes, the War Department forwarded the Bantam's blueprints to them, claiming the government owned all designs in the proposals submitted to it in the bidding contest. American Bantam chose not to dispute this.

Pilot models: Willys "Quad" and Ford "Pygmy"

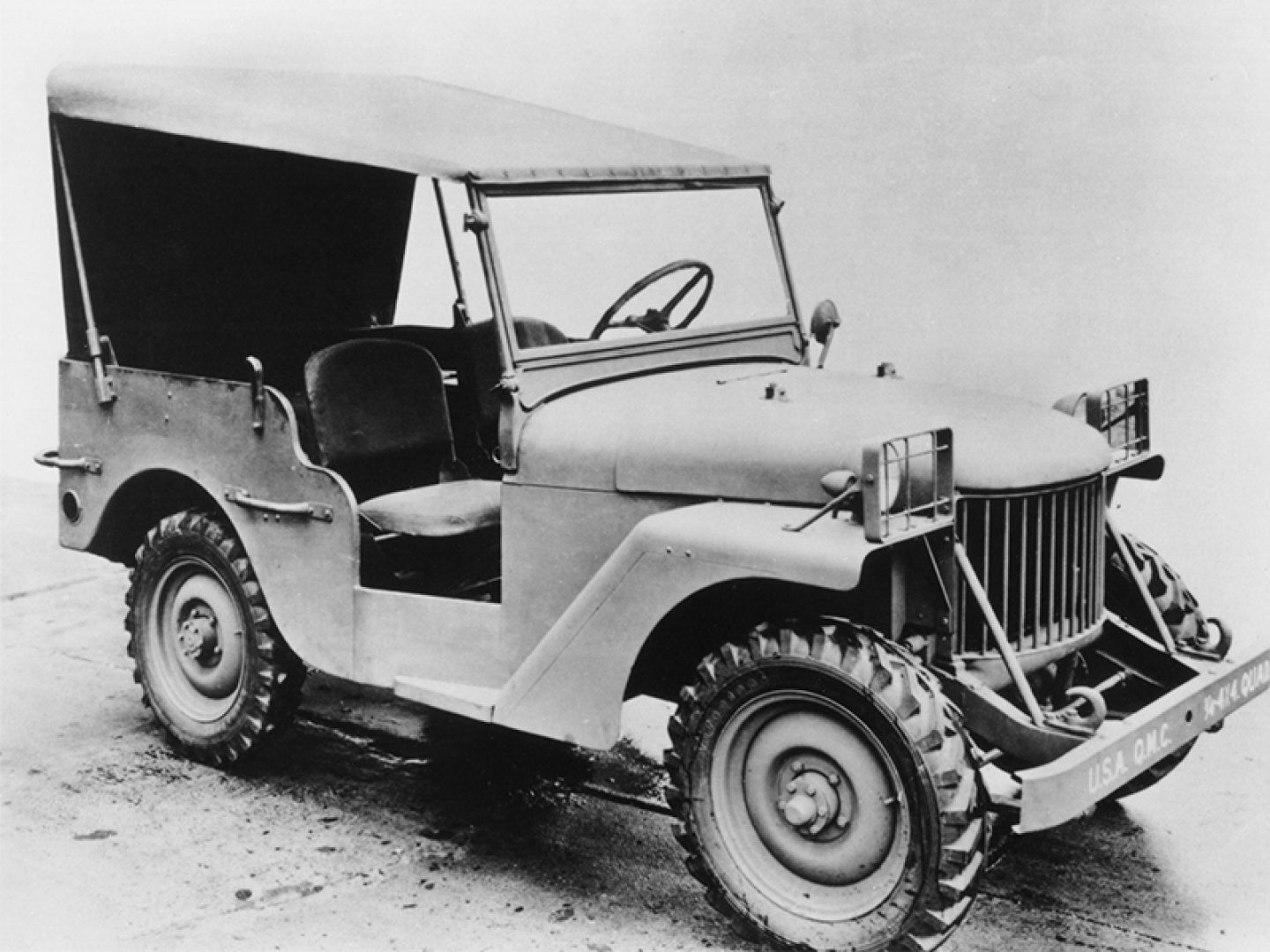
Willys "Quad" pilot car initially copied Bantam's rounded grille and hood.

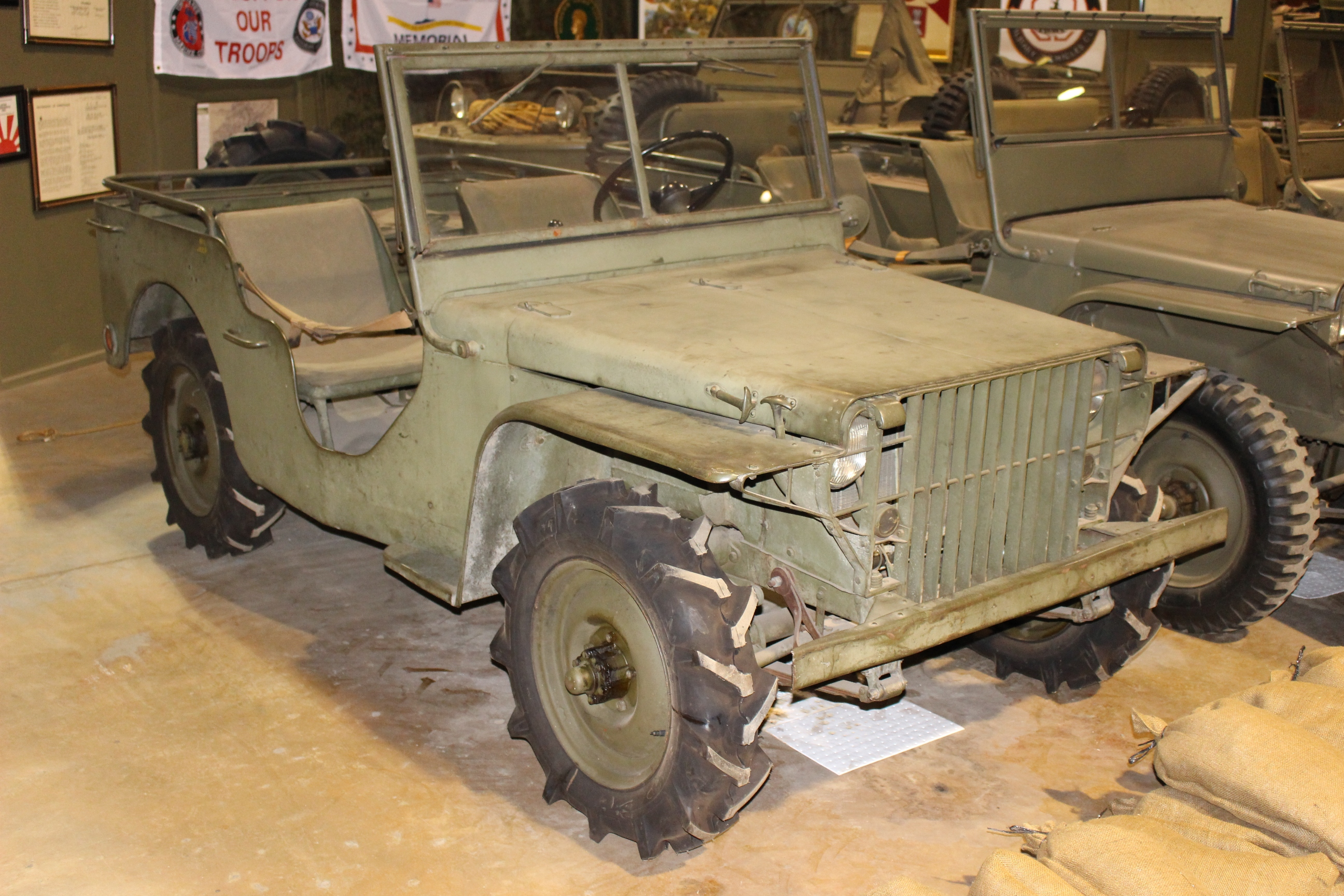
Ford's first test model, the "Pygmy" in the U.S. Veterans Memorial Museum.

Bantam continued building a further 70 prototypes, as per the initial contract. (Note: Sources differ whether Bantam built an additional 69 or 70 units. Considering that no. 1 Bantam didn't survive; some sources believe that it suffered so much damage during initial merciless testing that it was returned to Bantam and scavenged for parts to complete the first 70 units. Alternatively, it served as a demo vehicle until it got wrecked in a traffic accident in early 1941, then sent back to Butler, where it was disassembled, with its mechanicals likely mounted into a 1941 production Bantam. Legend has it that the unusable body sections were buried along with a pile of scrap on the Bantam grounds. (U.S. Army)) Bantam's original no.01 first remained at Holabird for incessant shake-down and breaking point testing, and ad hoc fixes and improvements of weaknesses, while by November 1940, Ford and Willys also submitted their first prototypes to compete in the Army's trials. Exterior changes, mainly mounting flat and square front fenders, instead of the first car's bulbous round ones, identify the BRC (Bantam Reconnaissance Car) Mark IIs, also called the "BRC 60".

Both the Willys "Quad" and the Ford "Pygmy" prototypes were similar to the Bantam Pilot and were tested alongside Bantam's Mark II models. The Willys Quad immediately stood out because of its strong engine of 60 gross Hp (SAE), (Note: The U.S. "Society of Automotive Engineers" at the time) which the soldiers liked very much, in such a lightweight, open-top car. Chief engineer Delmar 'Barney' Roos had been working on Willys' four-cylinder car engine for years, and with many detail changes had managed to get it to 60 hp from an initial low-forties output. The Ford Pygmy, on the other hand, was held back by its tractor engine, Ford's only four-cylinder engine still made in 1940, despite serious efforts to strengthen it. Dale Roeder led Ford's team behind the Pygmy, and they tuned the motor from 30bhp to the specified 40bhp by using a different camshaft and a bigger carburettor. More importantly, Ford's front sheet-metal design was the cleverest, fusing all the front lighting behind a straight grille grate, side by side, into one cheap, integrated whole under a wide, flat, horizontal hood that doubled as a makeshift table. With its simple piano hinge, it let the hood open all the way to the upright windshield without a prop rod, giving excellent engine access thanks to its wide opening.

Pre-production models: American Bantam Mk II, Ford GP, and Willys MA

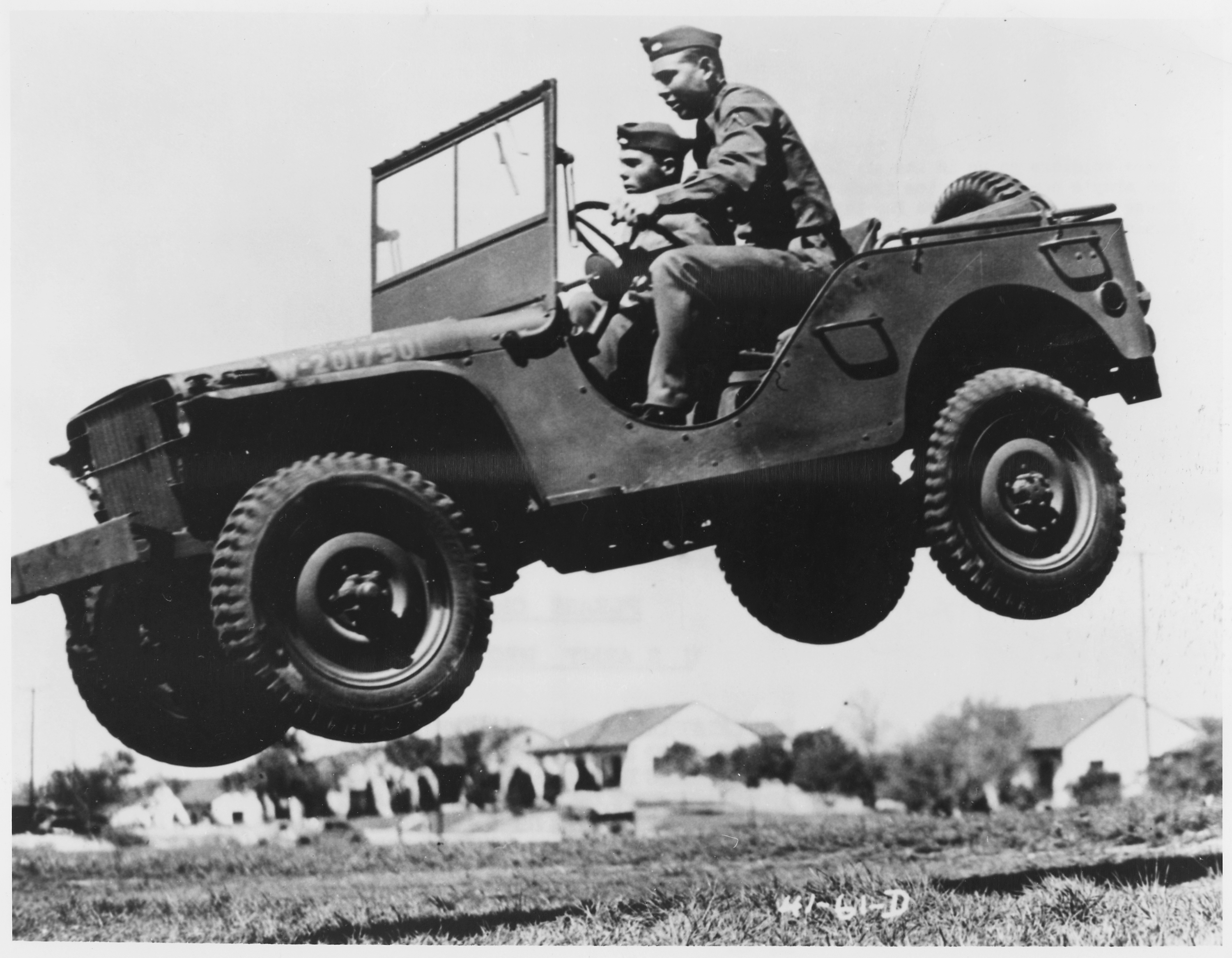
Vigorous testing was required for the Army, proving—shown a Ford GP, 1941

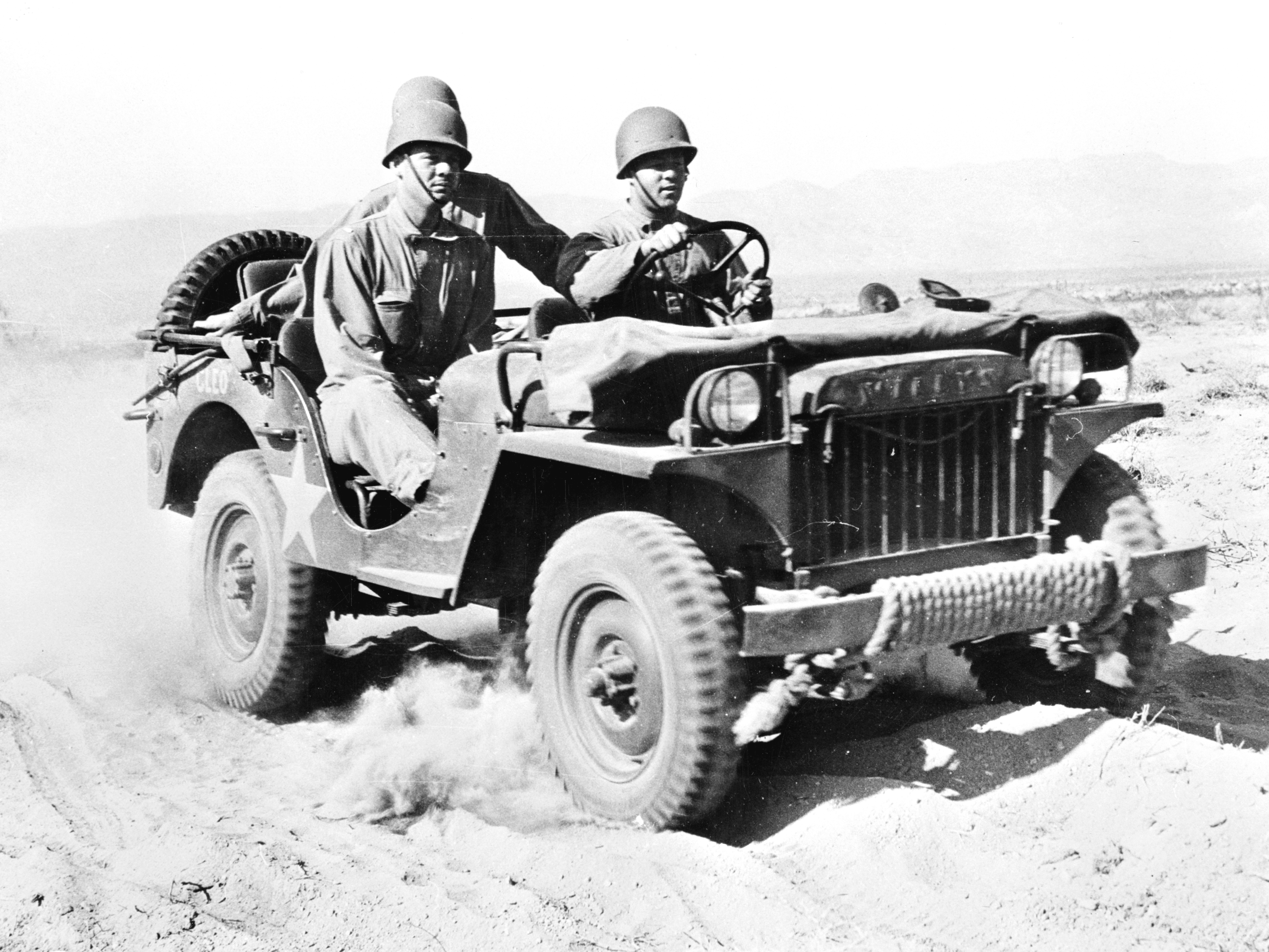
Willys MA jeep at the Desert Training Center, Indio, California, June 1942

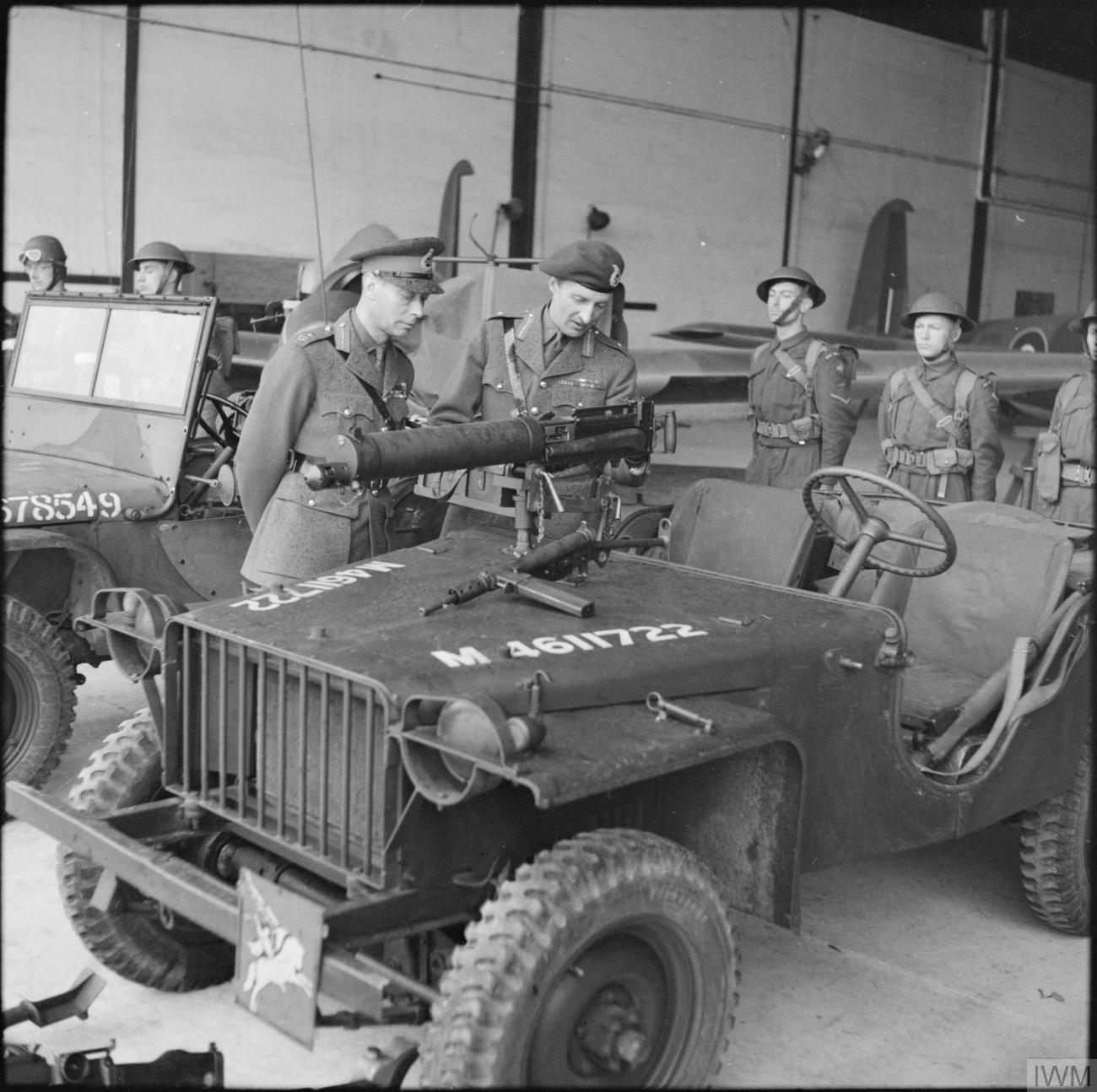
Allies hastily received interim models—King George VI of the United Kingdom inspects a 1941 Bantam BRC with an airborne unit in May 1942. A Vickers machine gun has been fitted to the bonnet.

By then, the U.S. armed forces were in such haste, and allies like Britain, France, and USSR wanted to acquire these new "Blitz-Buggies", (Note: Contemporaneous nickname in 1940/1941 British Empire and Canada.) that after initially considering 1,500 pre-production units in total, all three cars were declared 'acceptable', and orders for 1,500 units per company were given for field testing and export. At this time, it was acknowledged that the original weight limit (which even Bantam's Mk. II could not meet) was unrealistic, and it was raised to 2,160 lb (980 kg). On 22 January 1941, the Quartermaster Corps Technical Committee advised standardizing jeeps across all manufacturers.

For the ensuing pre-production runs, each maker's vehicles received further revisions and new names. For 1941, Bantam's got called the "BRC 40" (Note: But new research into identifying the earliest jeeps indicates that Bantam actually called them '41 BRC (for 1941).) Production began on 31 March 1941, with a total of 2,605 built up to 6 December – the number ordered was raised because Britain and the USSR already wanted more of them supplied under Lend-Lease.

The Bantam BRC-40 was the lightest and most nimble of the three early production models, and the Army praised its suspension, brakes, and fuel economy. However, because the company could not meet the Army's demand for 75 vehicles a day, it also awarded production contracts to Willys and Ford.

External images
- Four-wheel steering Willys Quad prototype (archived)
- Four-wheel steering Ford GP testing unit (archived)
- Collection of period LIFE photos of 1941 Bantams and a Ford GP, including 4-wheel steer
- Mechanical features of the new "Bug" explained in Popular Science, Oct 1941, page 54

Ford's pre-production jeep was named the "GP", with "G" indicating a "Government" contract, and "P" chosen by Ford to designate a car with a wheelbase of 80 in (203 cm). (Note: Ford's GP designation did not represent "general purpose" – that was a government description, not applied to the 1/4‑ton jeeps until ca. 1943.) The Ford GP was not only the most numerous (at about 4,458) early production jeeps—it was also the first jeep fielded in some numbers to U.S. Army units. Ford's overall design and construction quality had advantages over the Bantam and Willys models, but the GP's engine, an adaptation of the Model N tractor engine, was underpowered and not sufficiently reliable. Ford built fifty units with four-wheel steering, of which four have survived.

Willys-Overland was the last of the three manufacturers to start early production, waiting until 5 June 1941 to kick-off production, needing to reduce the Quad's weight by 240 lb (109 kg). After many painstaking detail changes, Willys renamed their vehicle "MA" for "Military" model "A". Only 1,555 MAs were built, most of which went to the Soviet Union under Lend-Lease. Only 27 units are still known to exist. After enough comparative testing, Willys was also tasked with integrating whatever features were seen as better on the Ford and Bantam into their design – for instance, copying the Ford's front sheet metal, to arrive at an optimal 'MB' model for mass production.

Eventually, virtually all Willys-Overland and most American Bantam and Ford GP early-production jeeps were sent to Britain and the USSR, leaving a few hundred Bantam BRCs and under 1,000 GPs for home troops.

=== Full production – Willys MB and Ford GPW ===
Standard 1944 cabin and engine

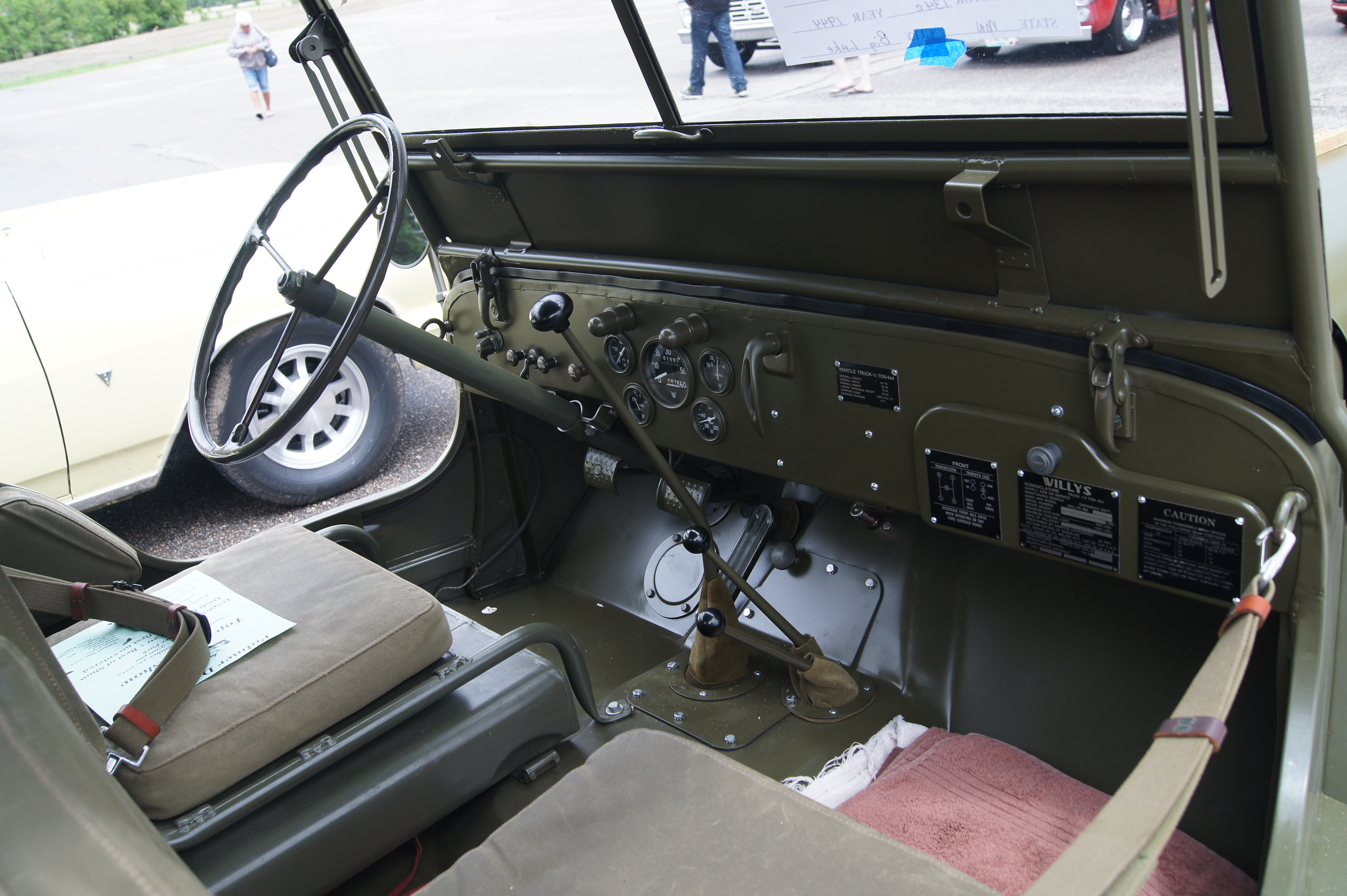
Three pedals and three sticks—for shifting gears, engaging front- or four-wheel drive, and high or low gearing

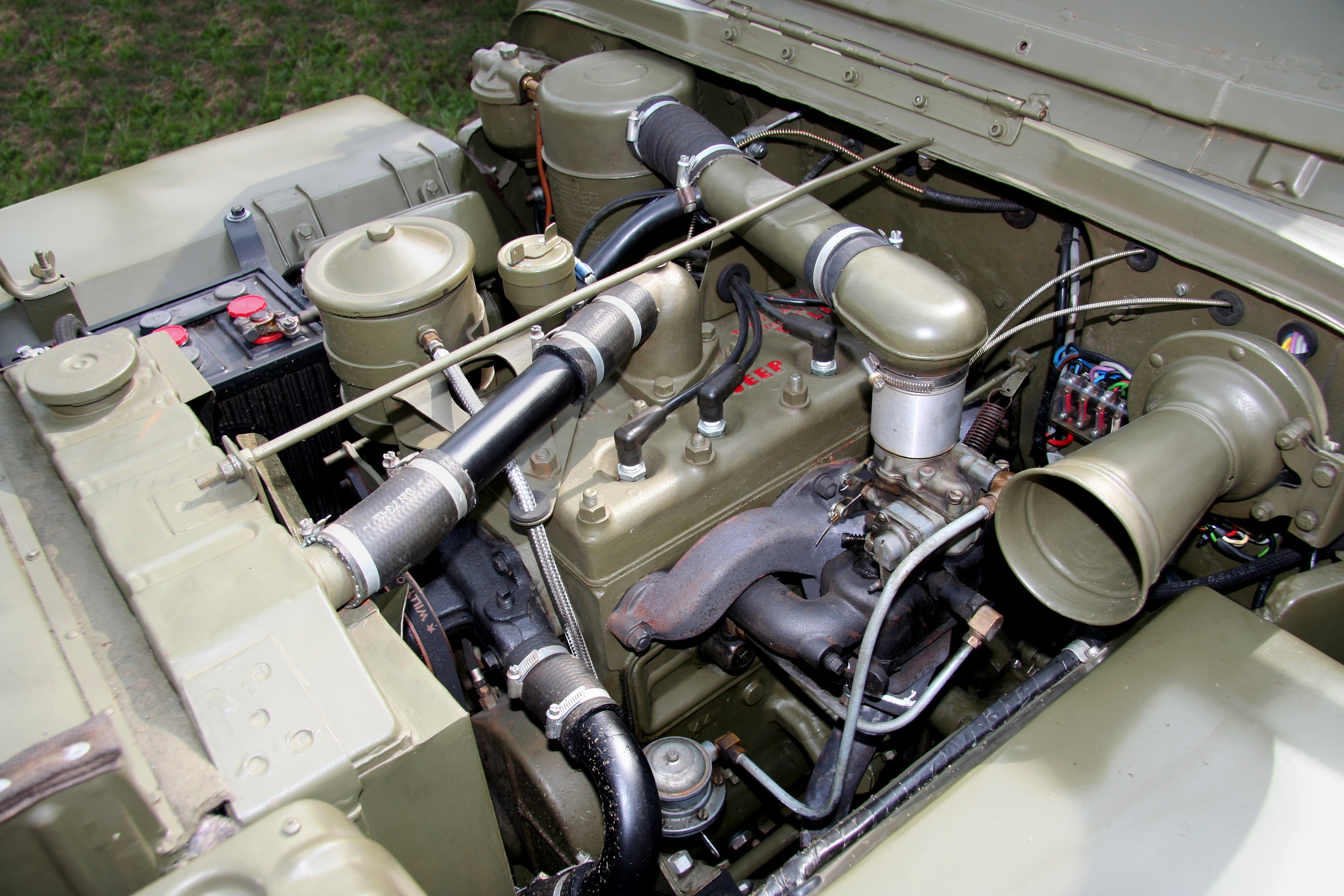
Willys "Go Devil" engine

By July 1941, the War Department wanted to standardize and decided to select a single manufacturer to supply the next order of 16,000 vehicles. Willys won the contract mainly because its much more powerful 60 hp engine (the L134 "Go Devil"), which soldiers raved about, and its lower cost and silhouette. The Bantam and Ford entries featured design improvements over Willys's design, which Willys incorporated, moving it from an "MA" designation to "MB". Most obvious is the front design from the Ford GP, with a wide, flat hood, and the headlights moved inward from the fenders to under the hood, protected by a single wide, straight front grille and a brush guard. D.G. Roos submitted a design patent to the US Patent Office, which Willys-Overland later assigned, codifying the now-familiar Jeep design.

Once it entered mass production, the Jeep introduced several new automotive technologies. Its first four-wheel drive introduced the need for a transfer case and the use of constant-velocity joints on the driven front wheels and axle in a regular production car-sized vehicle.

In early October 1941, it became clear that Willys-Overland could not keep up with procurement needs, and Ford received government contracts to build 30,000 units, according to Willys' blueprints, drawings, specifications, and patents, including the more powerful Willys engine. When Ford offered to increase the displacement and power of the tractor engine in their GP model, the government declined and insisted that Ford produce jeeps identical to the Willys, both for the benefit of Willys' much stronger engine, and for complete commonality/interchangeability of the jeep's parts and components. Willys, in turn, received no license fees from Ford or the government, and Ford complied. The Ford was designated "GPW", with the "W" indicating the "Willys" licensed design and engine. Ford retooled at a cost of $4 million (~$62.2 million in 2025) to build Willys engines and produced the first GPW as quickly as 2 January 1942. Just days before, in late December 1941, the Quartermaster Corps had ordered another 63,146 GPWs.

One extra condition of Ford's jeep orders was to manufacture them at several Ford assembly plants, in addition to Ford's primary "River Rouge" plant in Dearborn (Michigan). The QC expressly demanded that Ford decentralize their jeep manufacturing to facilitate the Army's logistics, shipping from all three coasts. Besides Dearborn, Ford also assembled jeeps in their Louisville, Chester (Pennsylvania), Dallas (Texas), and Richmond (California) plants. Ford's Edgewater (New Jersey) plant also built jeeps in the first four months of 1943.

During World War II, Willys produced 363,000 Jeeps, and Ford produced some 280,000. Some 50,000 were exported to the USSR under the Lend-Lease program. Ford's assembly across plants distributed as: River Rouge 21,559; Dallas and Louisville almost tied at 93,748 and 93,364 units respectively; Chester 18,533, and Edgewater just 1,333 units. Bantam stopped further jeep production and made two-wheel jeep trailers. This was sufficient to keep the firm going until it was taken over in 1956.

Ford built jeeps with functionally interchangeable parts and components, in part facilitated by using components from common sources: frames from Midland Steel, wheels from Kelsey-Hayes, and axles and transfer cases from Spicer. However, Ford had replaced the welded grate front grille by a single pressed/stamped sheet steel part, with nine vertical open slots to ventilate the radiator, and circular openings in front of the lights, to simplify production, and save costs. Willys also adopted this in their production of the MB after unit 25,808. Predictably, many minor differences remained; the Ford chassis had an inverted U-shaped front cross member instead of a tubular bar, and a Ford script letter "F" was stamped onto many small parts.

Many body detail differences remained until January 1944, when Ford and Willys finally agreed on a composite body fabricated by American Central. American Central had been making the Jeep's bodies for the first 1500 units of the Willys MA and had also built Ford's Jeep bodies for two years, but until January 1944, Ford and Willys contracts retained detail differences. After that, both designs integrated features from each other. Through the chaotic circumstances of war, sometimes peculiar deviations from regular mass production came off the assembly line, which are now prized by collectors. For instance, the earliest Ford GPWs had a Willys design frame, and in late 1943, some GPWs came with an unmodified Willys body; while in 1945, Willys produced some MBs with a deep mud exhaust system, vacuum windshield wipers, and a Jeep CJ‑style parking brake.

=== The Ford GPA, the amphibious jeep ===
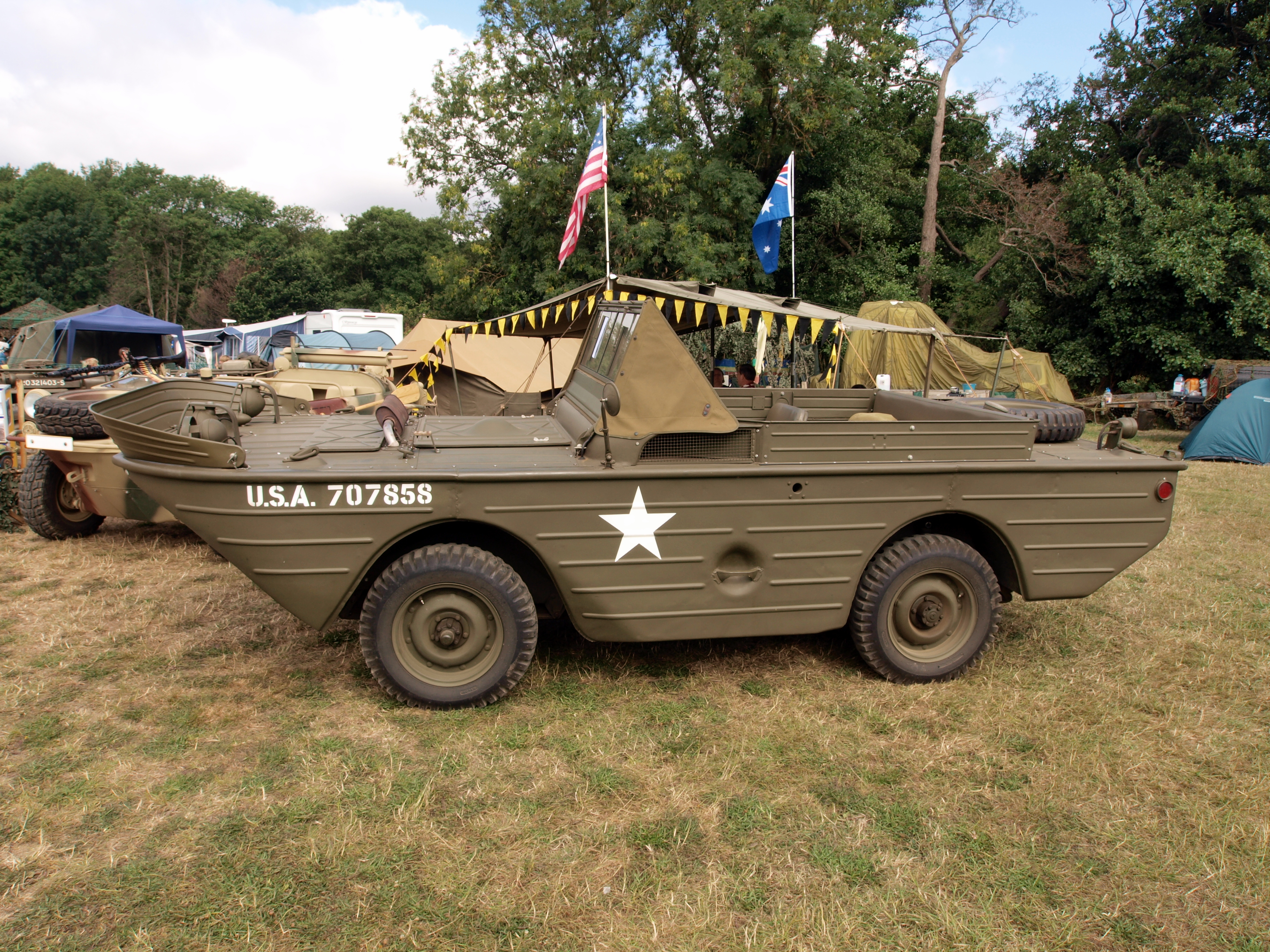
Ford GPA amphibious jeep

Approximately 13,000 additional amphibious jeeps were built by Ford as the Ford GPA (nicknamed "Seep" for "Sea Jeep"). Its design was directly inspired by the larger DUKW, and by the same designer and company, Rod Stephens Jr. of Sparkman & Stephens yacht designers. The vehicle was produced too quickly, or its operational capability and limitations were misunderstood. Although the GPA came out barely heavier, wider, or taller than standard jeeps, it was one third longer, and proved unwieldy on land. Adding insult to injury, the Seep would often get stuck in mud or, when wading, where the MB jeeps would not.

In water, its disappointing performance was even more problematic, because contrary to the DUKW, it had insufficient freeboard for coastal landings from open sea, leading to mixed success and tragic losses in the allied Sicily landings in July 1943. Many GPAs were passed on under the Lend-Lease program—some 3,500 (more than a quarter of total production) to the USSR alone. The Soviets, however, were sufficiently pleased with its ability to cross the rivers and swamps in their territories that they developed their own version of it after the war: the GAZ-46.

By contrast, Ferdinand Porsches engineering bureau designed an even lighter four-wheel drive amphibious vehicle, the VW Type 166 "Schwimmwagen," that quickly became popular in the German ranks, because of its excellent off-road performance, contrary to the limitations of their regular VW Kübelwagen without four-wheel drive – and they only used them on inland waters. The U.S. Ford GPA amphibious jeeps thus also became one of the rare allied vehicle types that were numerically outproduced by their direct German counterparts – the 15,000 plus VW Schwimmwagen.

=== Accessories and equipment fittings ===
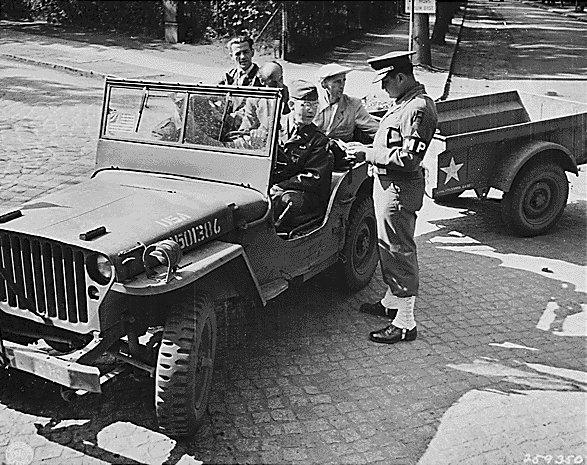
The World War II jeep with Bantam trailer, Potsdam, Germany

Unlike the various Dodge WC series models of larger, light 4×4 trucks, the Willys and Ford jeeps were all the same from the factory, and specialization happened only through standardized accessories, field kits, and local / in-field modifications. Frequently made additions to the standard jeeps were to fit weaponry, communications equipment, Litter carriers, wire cutters, or rudimentary armor.

==== Jeep trailer ====
Some 150,000 1/4-ton trailers were made by over ten different companies, specifically built to be towed by the jeep – most of them by Bantam and Willys. These doubled the jeeps' nominal payload.

==== Radio gear ====
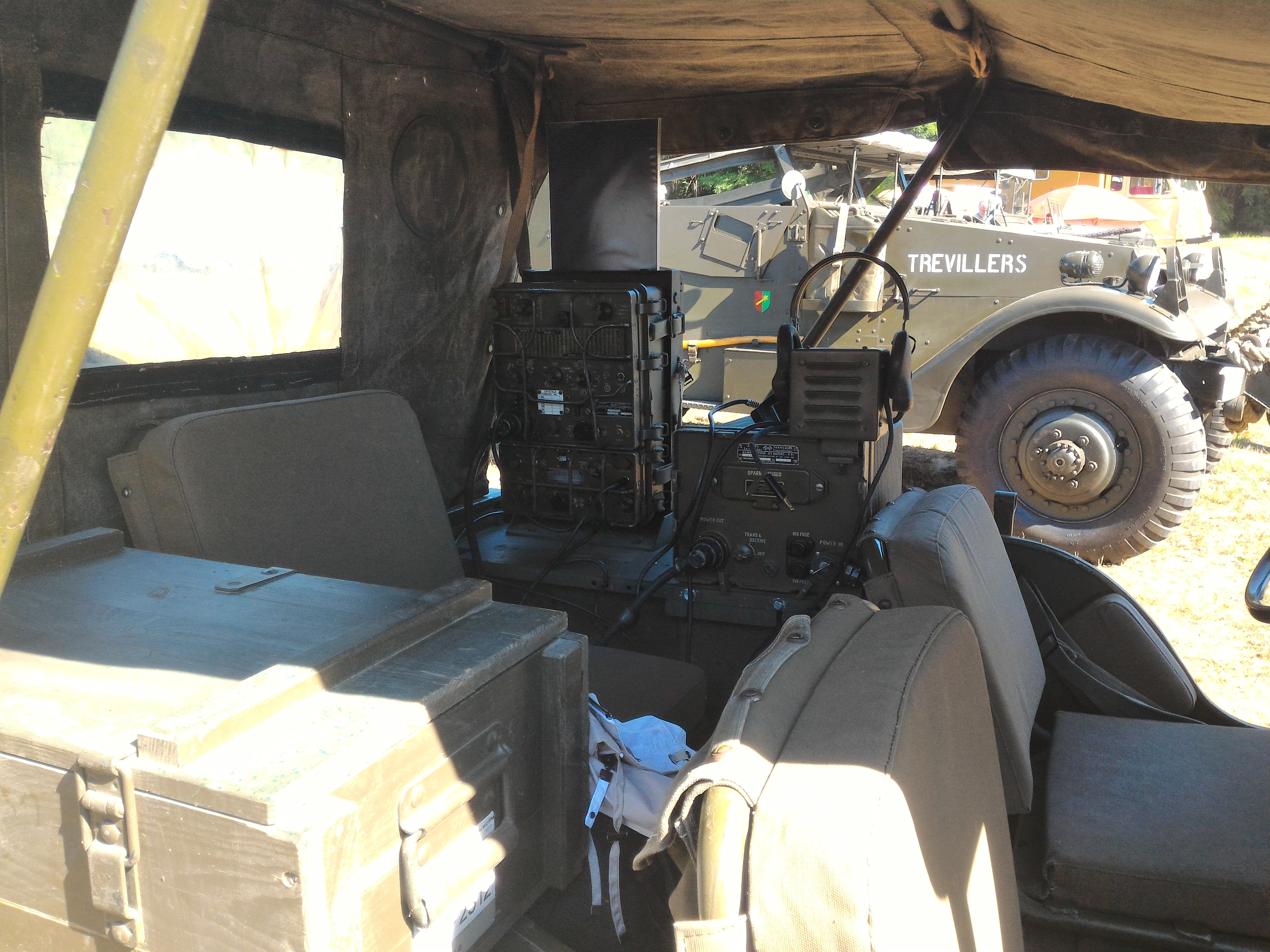
Willys jeep interior with radio

The jeep's primary command and reconnaissance roles, of course, necessitated fitting many kinds of tactical communication equipment. The first standard production fitting was for the SCR-193 radio, placed on either side in the rear of a jeep, on top of the rear wheel well. For proper reception, this included radio interference suppression shielding, so indicated by a suffix "S" on the jeep's hood registration number. In 1943/1944, the Army shifted to FM radios, and new fittings were developed for those. At least fourteen Signal Corps Radio set fittings were standardized, including for the SCR-187, SCR-284, SCR-499, SCR-506, SCR-508, SCR-510, SCR-522, SCR-528, SCR-542, SCR-608, SCR-610, SCR-619, SCR-628, SCR-694, SCR-808, SCR-828, and VRC-l.

==== Gun mounts ====
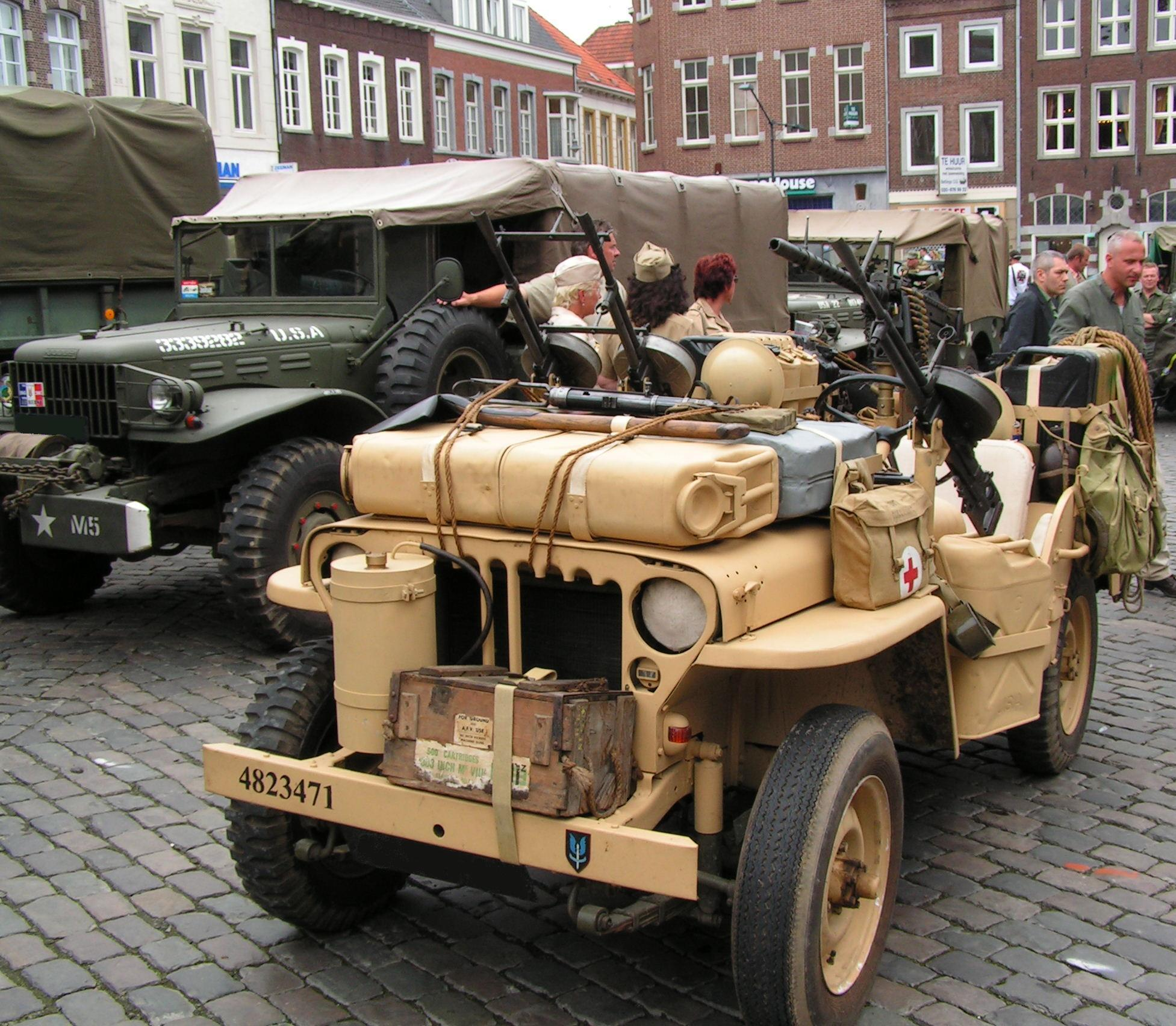
British SAS jeep, armed with Vickers K machine gun for driver and twin Vickers K for the co-driver

Two of the original uses of the 1/4‑ton truck were reconnaissance and the support of infantry with machine guns. These roles led to the desire to mount automatic rifles to be fired from the jeep. To mount either a .30-caliber M1919 Browning machine gun or .50-cal (12.7 mm) M2 Browning heavy machine gun, the M31 pedestal, a tubular pedestal with bracing in three directions, was developed. This was the most common factory jeep machine-gun mount during the war, with 31,653 produced. It was followed by the improved M31C in March 1945, but this came too late for much combat in World War II. Besides these, units often created their own pedestal mounts in the field or adapted other pedestal mounts as available. Additionally, in 1943, the M48 bracket mount was standardized to attach the .30-cal. Machine gun or .30-cal. M1918 Browning Automatic Rifle in front of the passenger seat. Like with the pedestals, troops improvised many gun-holding brackets in the field. Troops frequently preferred a .30 cal machine gun on a pivot, to fire from the front passenger seat.

Aside from actual fielding intentions, the jeep was widely used for various weapons mounts trials during World War II, simply because the jeep was a handy platform to test all kinds of ring mounts, multiple gun mounts, as well as different weapons. The widespread adoption of the jeep in other armies also meant many different armaments. The most rigorous efforts were by the British. Perhaps the most well-known are the jeeps modified by the SAS for the 1942 desert raids in Egypt. These had several armaments, commonly using twin 0.303-inch Vickers K machine guns on the passenger side.

=== Field kits ===
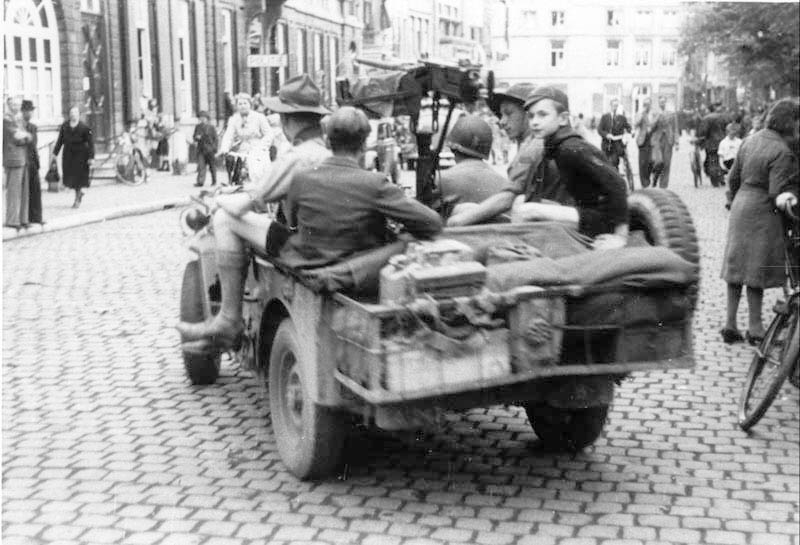
Jeep with rear baggage rack (Netherlands, 1944); note that the spare wheel was relocated to the rear right side

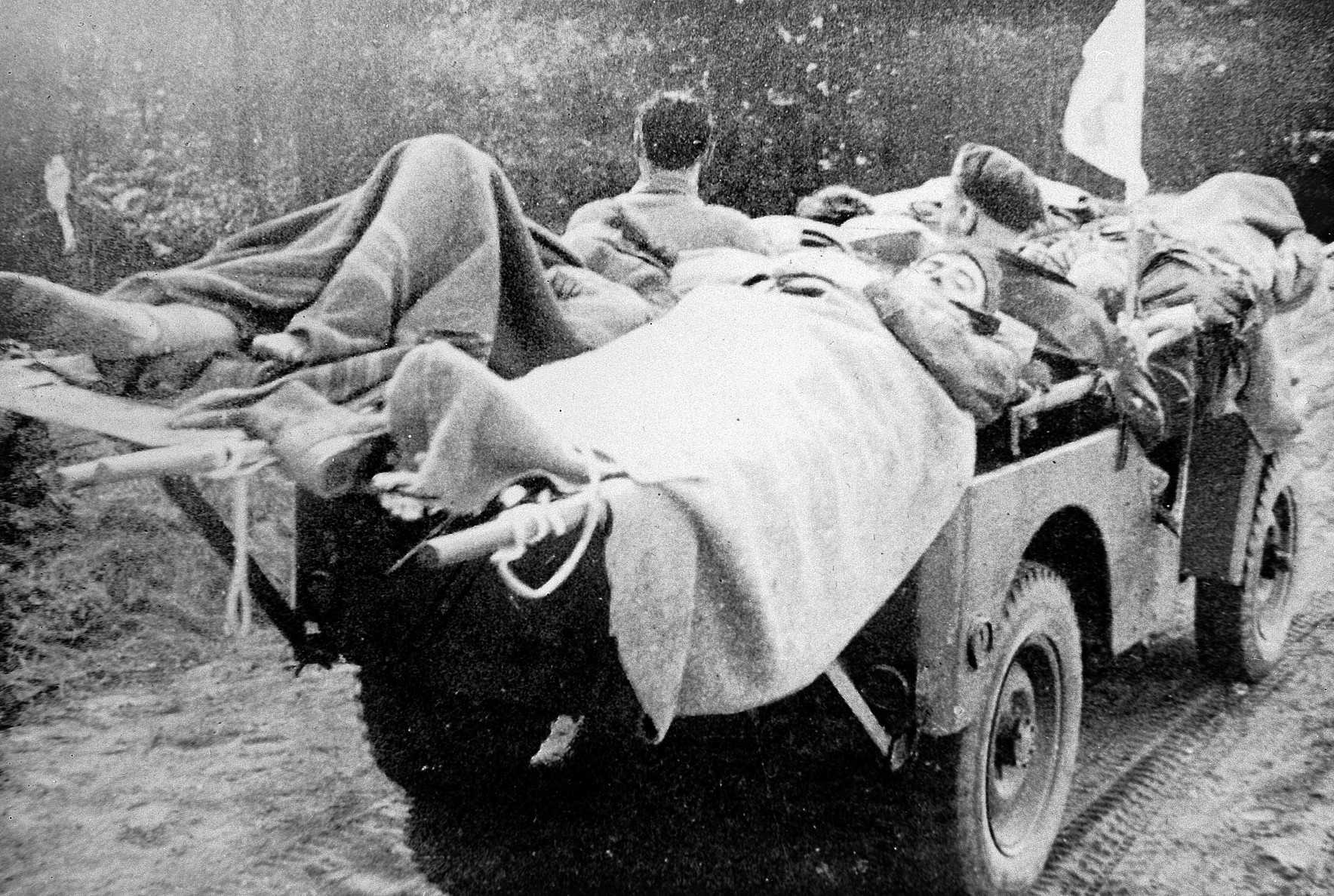
Ambulance jeeps often had racks for two litter patients front and back

Many field kits originated as locally made modifications and additions, for which standard kits were later produced by both the U.S. and Britain. Frequently used examples were rear baggage racks, ambulance litters and frames to transport lying wounded on jeeps, and wire cutters. Soldiers frequently ran into (literally) wires—either inadvertently, inconveniently strung communication wires, or deliberately placed by the enemy, to injure or kill motorcycle and vehicle personnel. The typical countermeasure was to mount a tall vertical steel bar to the front bumper, which would either cut offending strings or deflect them over the heads of the jeep crew. This was first used in Tunisia in 1943, but became frequent in Italy (1943–1945), and especially necessary in France (1944).

More specific kits were created to enhance off-roading and mechanical capabilities, dealing with extreme climates, and technical support applications, like laying communication cables, or a field arc welder kit.

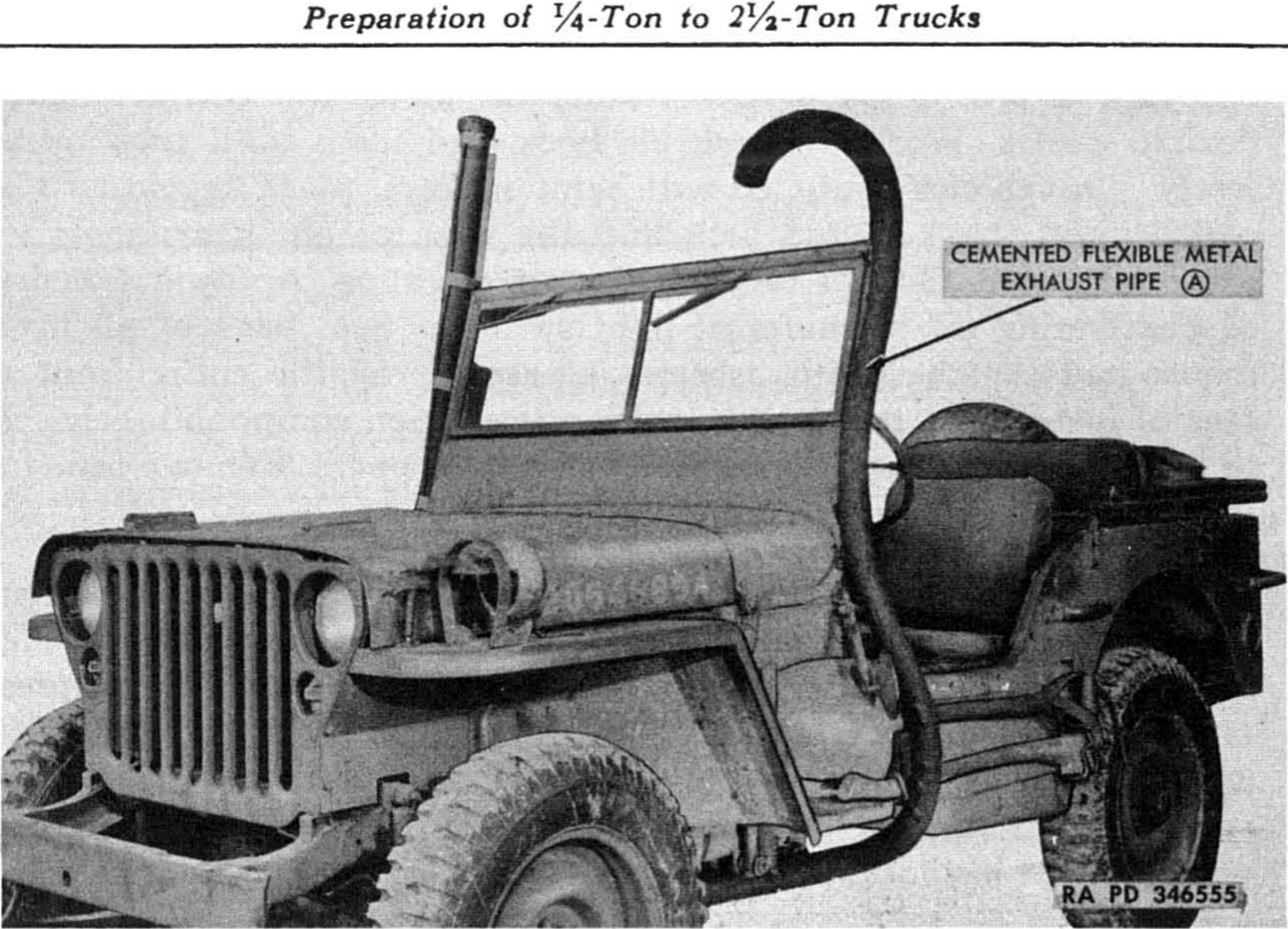
WV-6 snorkel kit for deep water fording, from TM9-2853 (1945)

Many solutions made the jeep run on rails, popular in the Pacific theater with U.S., Britain, and Commonwealth troops, especially in Burma. A-frames on the front bumper enabled two jeeps to tow heavy trailers (for 2 1/2‑ton trucks) in tandem. For desert cooling, radiator surge tanks were used in North Africa in 1942. Equally, there were winterization kits, even snowplows, and the jeep's go-anywhere capability was further aided with deep water fording kits, tire air compressors, and a winch option. For communications, jeeps were modified with rear ditch plows and cable laying reels, such as the RL-31 reel unit.

==== Off-road enhancements ====
To disembark jeeps in amphibious landings, in 1943, a deep-water fording kit for the jeep was produced. This enabled jeeps to be driven off landing craft like the Landing Craft Mechanized (LCM), wading into relatively deep water, without flooding the engine or short-circuiting the electrical system. After several interim kits were issued, the U.S. Army standardized the universal WV-6 kit (later G9-5700769), which served all WWII 1/4‑ton to 2 1/2‑ton trucks. The kit contained flexible hoses for both the exhaust and the air intake, as well as proper waterproofing equipment. Westinghouse developed a T1 air compressor, to be used in conjunction with special tires, to deflate the tires off-road, in soft mud or snow, and be able to pressurize them again after. It could be fitted under a maintenance work order from October 1944. There was even a small capstan winch field kit made for the jeep, driven off the motor, for self-extracting, or pulling other jeeps trapped in mud or snow. The winch was very small and made hand-cranking of the jeep impossible. The latter two features remained rare.

==== Arctic weather measures ====
Willys developed a winterization kit for very cold climates. This included a cold-starting stove, crankcase ventilator, primer, hood insulation blanket, radiator blanket, a body enclosure kit, defroster/de-icer, and snow chains. These kits were, however, frequently unavailable, so units took their own measures in the field, particularly improvising various body enclosures, to protect the crew from extreme weather. In addition, two companies fabricated snowplows for the jeep. Geldhill Road Machinery Company made the 7T1NE plow, an angled single blade, while the JV5.5E was a V-shape design. The Wausau Iron Works built two similar designs, designated as the J and JB snowplows. Neither of these seems to have been commonly issued in combat. Photos of snowplows in use in the European theater mostly show improvised plows, likely adaptations of snowplows locally found at hand.

=== Further development of the jeep ===
Although no other light jeeps were taken into production, it was not for lack of trying. Both key military men, who had been championing the development of military vehicle concepts they had formulated for years—sometimes already since World War I—had led to conclusions about the logic of military mechanization, as well as automakers large and small, who now saw that in wartime, all of a sudden, there were budgets available to work with. Of course, this was primarily true for the firms involved so far.

After losing out on mass-production of the four-wheel drive 1/4‑ton, Bantam built the Army one 4×2 quarter-ton chassis in 1942, but to no further consequence.

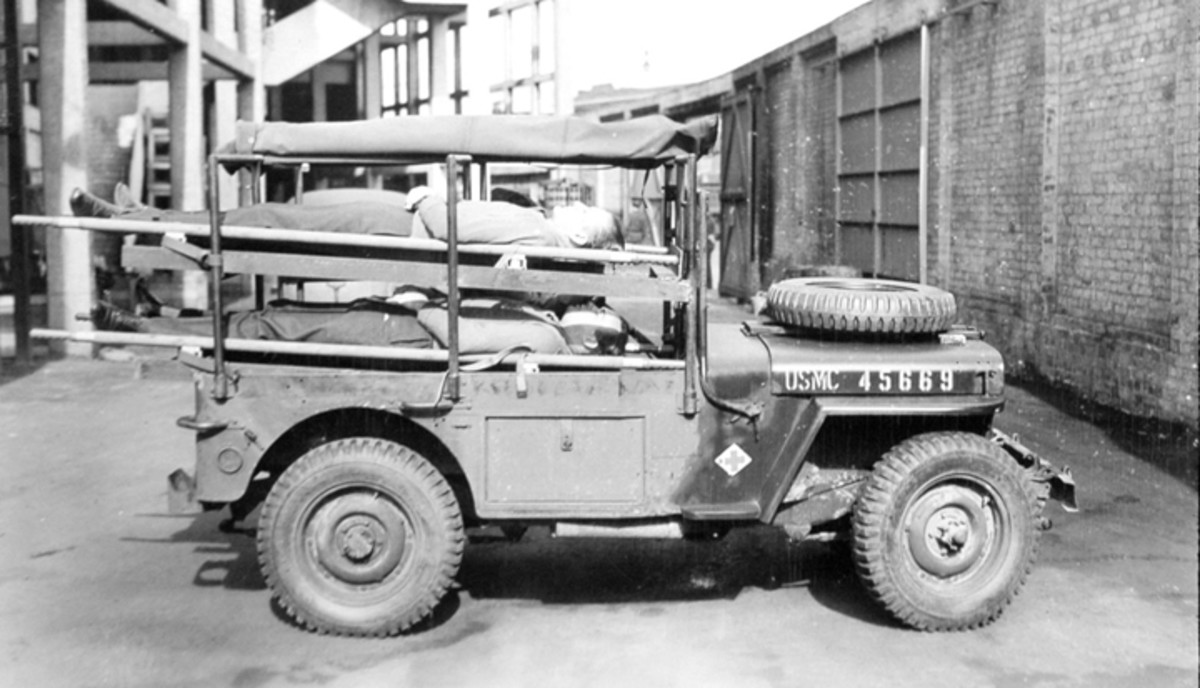
Holden-modified WW II ambulance jeep for the U.S.M.C. in the Pacific War. Note that the medical supplies locker is in place of the right front seat. Source: National Archives

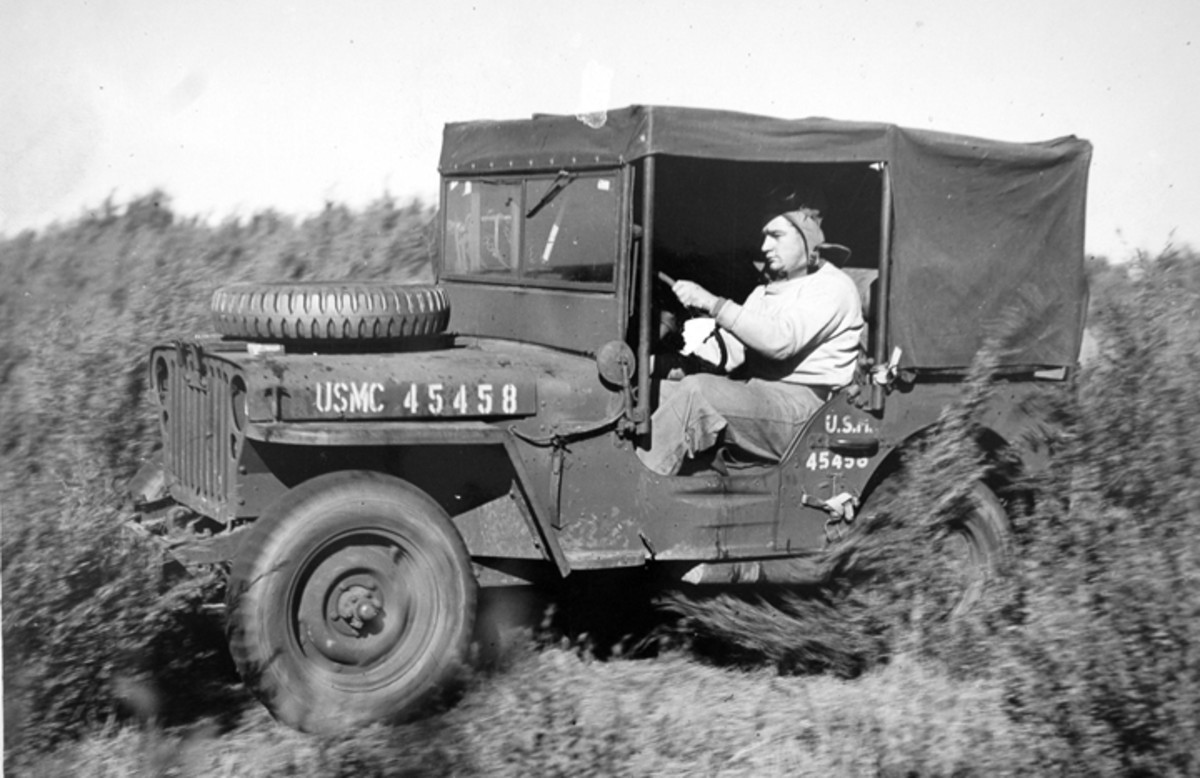
Holden-modified MB/GPW jeep field-ambulance for U.S.M.C. in the Pacific War, series I. Series II and III were made some 6 inches (15 cm) taller.

An exception was an order for a series of some 200 to 500 standardized jeeps to be modified, by Holden (as General Motors Australia), into field ambulances for the U.S. Marine Corps in the Pacific Theater, because they found the standard 3/4‑ton Dodge WC-54 ambulances too unwieldy, and even their own 1/2‑ton, 4×4 International M-1-4 vehicles both too ponderous and too scarce. In 1942, Lt. Cmdr. French Moore, MC, a battalion surgeon with the 2nd Marine Division (Camp Elliott, CA), started developing his design for an MB/GPW-based "light field-ambulance." He submitted blueprints and records of performance of his prototype to Marine Corps Commandant Lt. Gen. Thomas Holcomb. It could carry up to "35 patients 1,000 yards and return, in an hour." Rebuilt to Moore's design, it was approved for fielding in time for the Solomon Island Campaign in 1943. Three series were built in modest numbers but totaling more than the USMC's own ambulance versions of their International M-1-4 and M-2-4s.

==== Lightweight jeeps ====
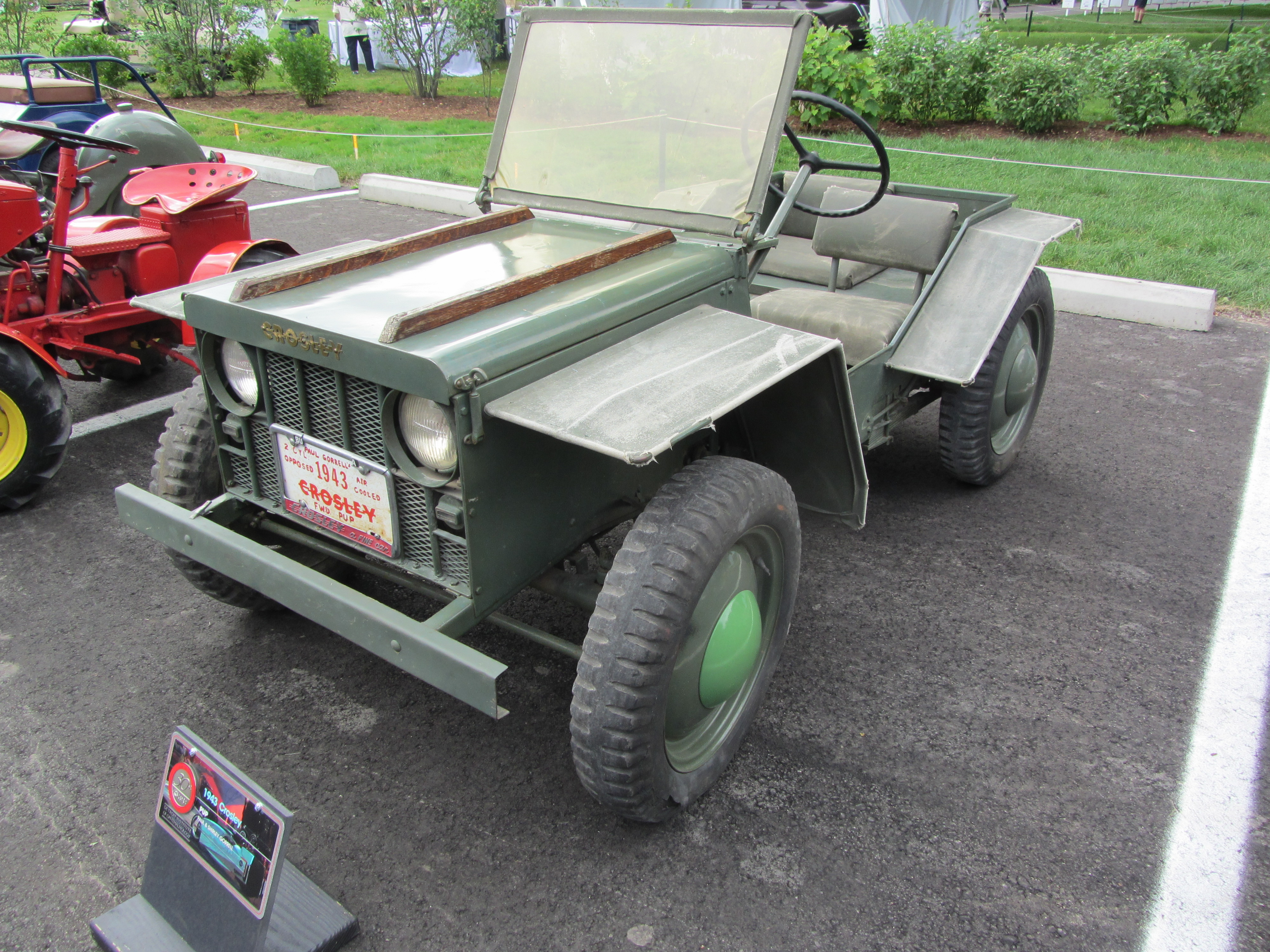
One of thirty-six Crosley CT-3 'Pup' extra-light, 4WD mini-jeep prototypes

After the initial design specification of a maximum 1,275 lb (578 kg) weight had been raised to almost double that in production, to achieve the necessary ruggedness on the main 1/4‑ton, the Army still wanted a truly lightweight model for airborne missions and use in the jungles of the Pacific theaters. In 1942 and 1943, at least five companies proposed designs: Crosley, Chevrolet, Ford, Willys, and Kaiser. The Crosley CT-3 "Pup" prototypes were superlight, one- or two-passenger, but still four-wheel-drive buggies that were transportable and air-droppable from a Douglas C-47 Skytrain. Six of the 2-cylinder, 13 hp, 1,125-pound (510 kg) Pups were deployed overseas after undergoing tests at Fort Benning, Georgia, but the project was discontinued due to several weak components. Seven of 36 Pups built are known to survive.

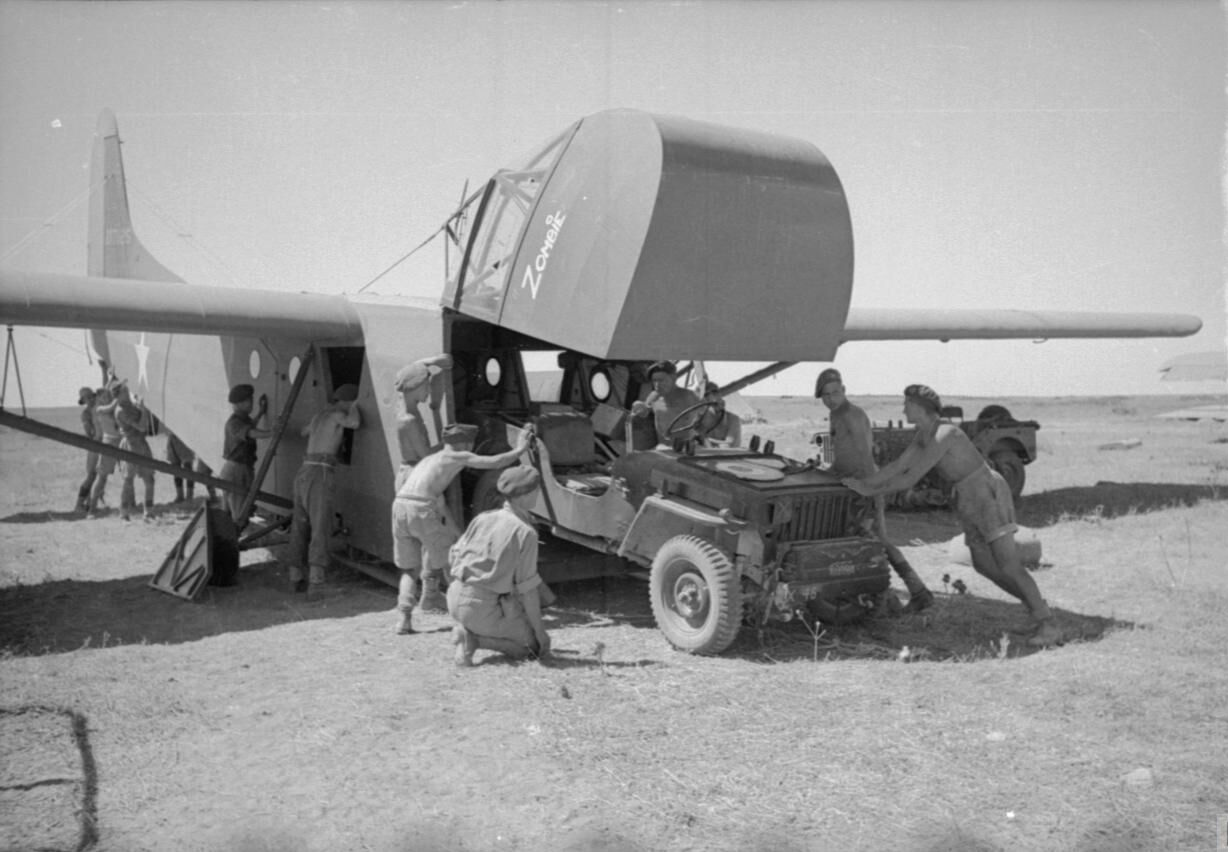
Preparing for the July 1943 Sicily campaign: a jeep is loaded onto an American Waco CG-4A glider plane.

Most of the competitors' models were more similar to standard jeeps, just lighter and smaller. Willys managed to reduce the weight on their 'MB-L' (MB Lightweight) to some 1,570 lb (710 kg) in 1943; and Army engineers were impressed by the Chevrolet and its advanced features: a single center spar frame, and an integrated gearbox and transfer case. Kaiser created six 1,300–1,400-pound (590–640 kg) prototypes with a 42 hp engine but including some unfavorable design trade-offs.

Willys eventually produced even more radical designs. The Willys WAC (Willys Air Cooled) had three seats, built around a centrally mounted 24 hp Harley Davidson engine, weighed only 1,050 lb (480 kg), but was noisy and not user-friendly. Still, it showed promise and was further developed, eventually resulting in the Willys JBC, or "Jungle Burden Carrier." By early 1945, this had turned into a mere 561 lb (254 kg) motorized wheeled load-carrying platform, with a single seat, that preceded the 1950s Willys M274 "Mechanical Mule."

In Britain, Nuffield Mechanizations and Aero cut down a Willys MB in length and width, and stripped it for minimum weight, to serve airborne forces. The Airborne Forces Development Centre in Wiltshire oversaw an entire modification program for jeeps in airborne units, involving many modifications to reduce both weight and or size, including to wedge them into Horsa gliders, for operation Market Garden.

==== Antitank jeeps ====
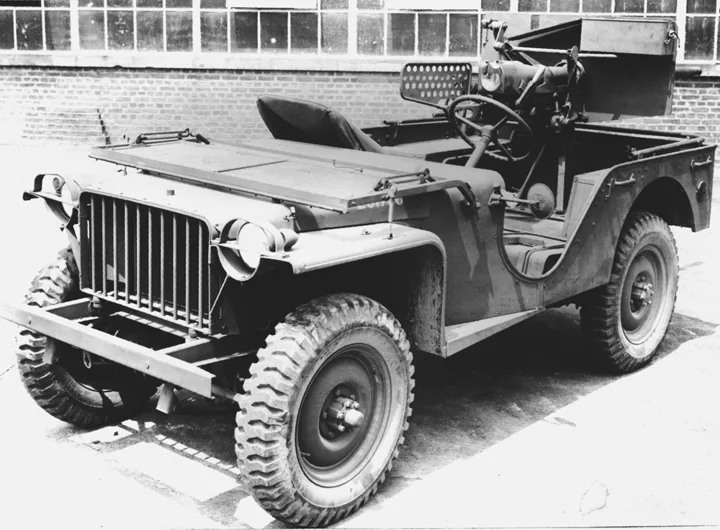
1941 exp. 37mm anti-tank GMC prototype on a Bantam BRC-40 T2E1, as the 1/4‑ton car itself was still in development.

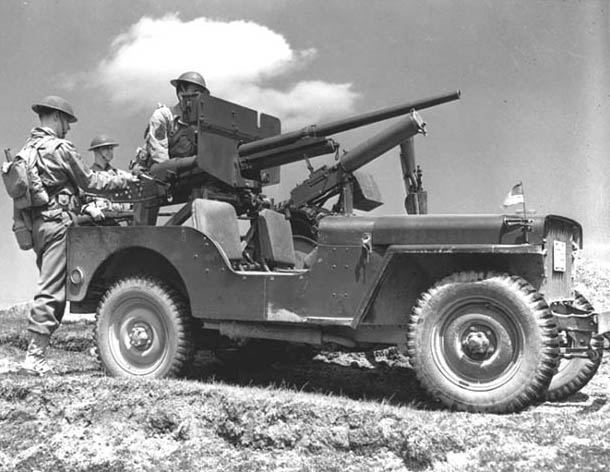
Jeep with a 37mm cannon and a belt-fed, water-cooled, rapid-fire Browning M1917A1 machine gun in U.S. 3rd Infantry, Newfoundland, 1942

Besides towing 37 mm antitank guns, it was also tested mounted directly on the quarter‑tons. In early 1941, the US Army's Tank Destroyer Command was urgently looking to make their anti-tank guns more mobile, to serve their tactical doctrine better. One of the first prototypes, the T2 37 mm gun motor carriage (GMC), mounted a standard 37 mm gun and gun shield on a Bantam BRC-40, aiming forward over the hood. Seven of these were built and tested, starting in May 1941, but were found awkward. So instead, eleven T2E1 GMC units aimed the 37 mm gun rearwards for trials. Shooting rearwards had advantages, but this configuration also proved difficult to man and operate the gun. The units were all dismantled into regular jeeps. In 1942, the larger 3/4‑ton Dodge WC-52 was converted and standardized as the M6 gun motor carriage, with a rear-aiming 37mm M3 gun, but these also worked poorly in the field, and most were rebuilt back to regular WC-52 trucks.

Late in the war, in 1945, the first large-caliber recoilless rifles became available, and the first jeep-mounted tests were performed, but they only came to fruition after World War II. One rare exception was Operation Varsity, for which two 75-mm. recoilless rifles were issued to the 17th U.S. Airborne Division, which could be mounted on their jeeps, proving useful in anti-tank fights.

==== Rocket jeeps ====
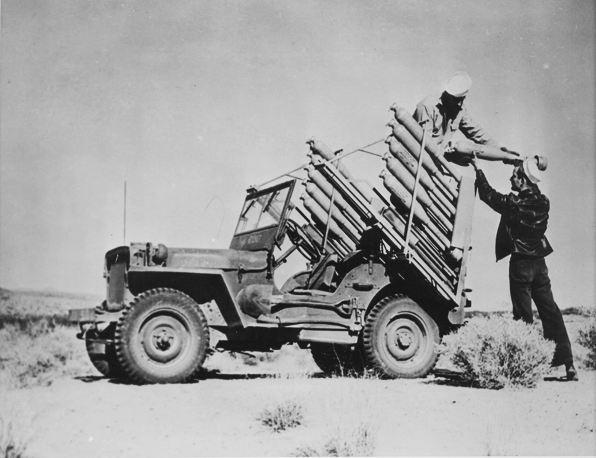
Experimental rocket-artillery jeep, Inyokern Naval Air Facility, Jan 1945

The jeep, being too light to mount substantial guns, was more suited later in the war as a platform for rocket artillery, which didn't have the enormous recoil of conventional tube artillery. The California Institute of Technology developed two different 4.5-inch jeep-based rocket launcher systems for the U.S. Navy. Several other initiatives all used 4.5-inch rockets and tubes. Testing was also done by both the U.S. Army and the Marine Corps, but none of the jeep-mounted rocket launchers were built in any significant number because it was more efficient to use larger trucks that could carry more rockets. The Soviet Red Army deployed twelve units fitted with 12-rail M-8 82mm rocket launchers in the bed of a jeep, from December 1944 in the Carpathian Mountains.

==== Stretched and uprated jeeps ====
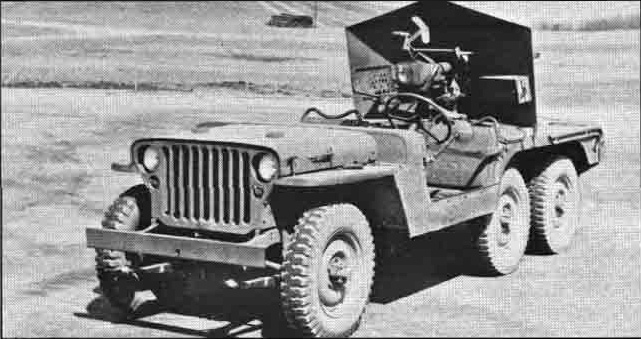
Willys T14, rearwards firing 37 mm gun motor carriage (GMC)—the first 6×6 "Super-Jeep"

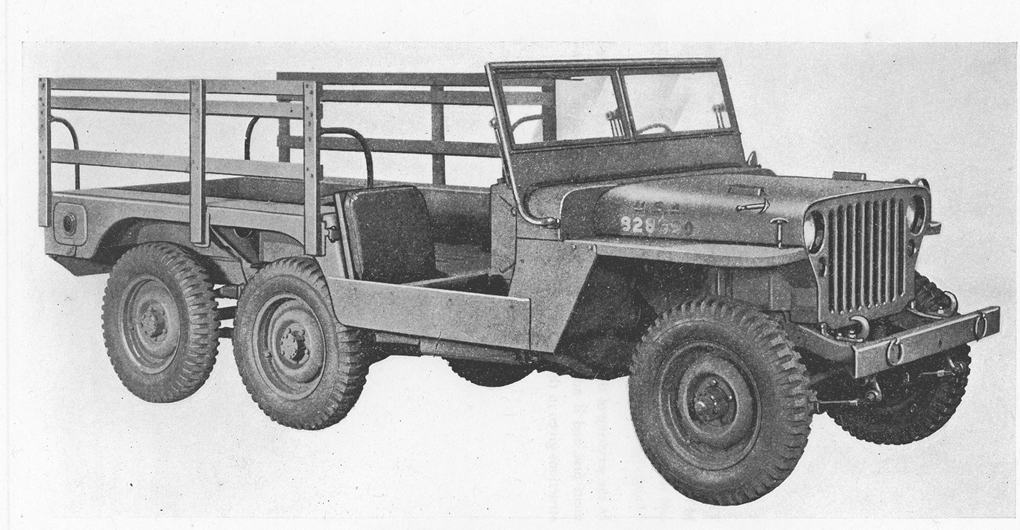
Willys MT-TUG, 3/4‑ton 6×6 Tractor/"Super-Jeep"; picture from TM10-1513 manual supplement

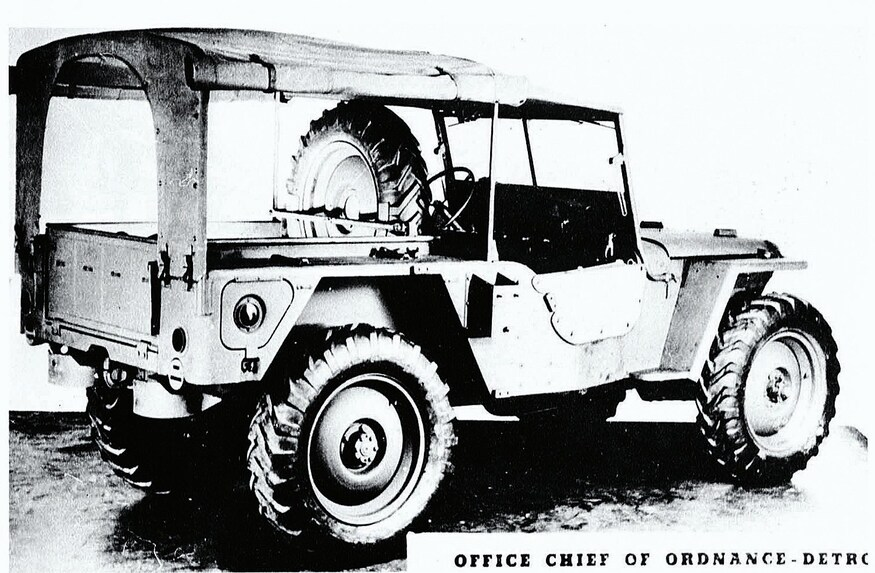
Willys MLW-2 pickup, 1/2‑ton, 4×4, "Light Jungle" prototype initially rode on 36-inch (91 cm) wheels and tires, and had a whole new rear, with a tailgate

The simplest and most frequently used method was the addition of a rear baggage rack to extend the jeep's luggage space. In exceptional cases, units would actually stretch both body and frame of a jeep to give it more passenger and luggage space, but for this usage, a Dodge WC model was available in many cases. Nevertheless, building stretched, 6×6 jeeps with 3/4‑ton cross-country payload, was explored with much interest. As early as July 1941, after the unsuccessful testing with the T2 and T2E1 37 mm antitank guns mounted on Bantam jeeps, the U.S. Quartermaster Corps (QMC) thought to lengthen 1/4‑ton jeeps into 6WD for specialized roles, including the 37 mm gun. Willys was contracted that month for both a T13 and a T14 gun motor carriage, based on the Willys MA – one firing forward, and one rearward, like the earlier Bantams. In reality, two models of rearward-firing T14 were built, based on Willys MBs, one with a slat grille in late 1941, and one or more stamped grilles by January 1942.

Nevertheless, the QMC and Willys kept developing the 3/4‑ton 6×6, in various versions, as the "Super-Jeep." By March 1942, the T14 GMC was revised as a cargo / prime mover, named Willys 'MT-TUG', that could compete in some roles with the 3/4‑ton Dodges. The Army tested these in various configurations, up to a 1‑ton rated version, as a light, multi-purpose tractor truck, cargo, or personnel carrier. For the United States Army Air Force (USAAF), several MT-Tug units were built with a fifth-wheel coupling on the cargo floor, for various Fruehauf trailers, and loaded with sandbags on the cargo bed, even as aircraft tugs.

The Willys MT models had the same 3/4‑ton rating as the new for 1942 Dodge WC series, but weighed only 3,100 lb (1,400 kg), with a 300 miles (480 km) range, and a top speed of 55 miles per hour (89 km/h). Willys pointed out that every 6×6 "Super Jeep" would save 2,000 lb (910 kg) of steel for their construction, as well as 40% in fuel usage, compared to the Dodge trucks. Moreover, it comprised 65% unaltered standard jeep components, and many of the other parts were also just modified standard jeep parts. By January 1943, the Willys MT-TUG was further evaluated by the Army Transport Command at Camp Gordon Johnston, FL. It was positively reviewed there for its effortless operation in deep sand. Although the Willys 3/4‑ton's performance was even called 'exemplary' by some.

Fifteen 6×6 Willys MT(-Tug)s alone were built as "Truck, 3/4‑ton, 6×6, Tractor", under Ordnance production contract W‑303‑ORD‑4623, production order T6620, and even a maintenance supplement for the "6×6 Willys MB‑Tug" was printed with the 1943 TM10‑1513 technical manual. Including miscellaneous test units, a total of 24 units are believed to have been built, with six known survivors.

An even smaller number of 1/2‑ton jeeps with a slightly stretched wheelbase were built as the Willys MLW(−1) through MLW-4 "Jungle Jeep." LW stood for Long(er) Wheelbase, to accommodate significantly larger wheels and 7.50–20 tires with a tractor-like profile, with the objective to serve in the jungles of the Pacific theater, after a September 1943 request from the South West Pacific for a truck with payload and mobility over mud and swamps of jungle terrain, superior to that of the regular jeep. (Note: Although uprating from 1/4‑ton to 1/2‑ton seems like doubling, the 1/4‑ton standard rating is nominal – the real standard jeep rating was 1,200 lb (540 kg) on road, and 800 lb (360 kg) off-road.)

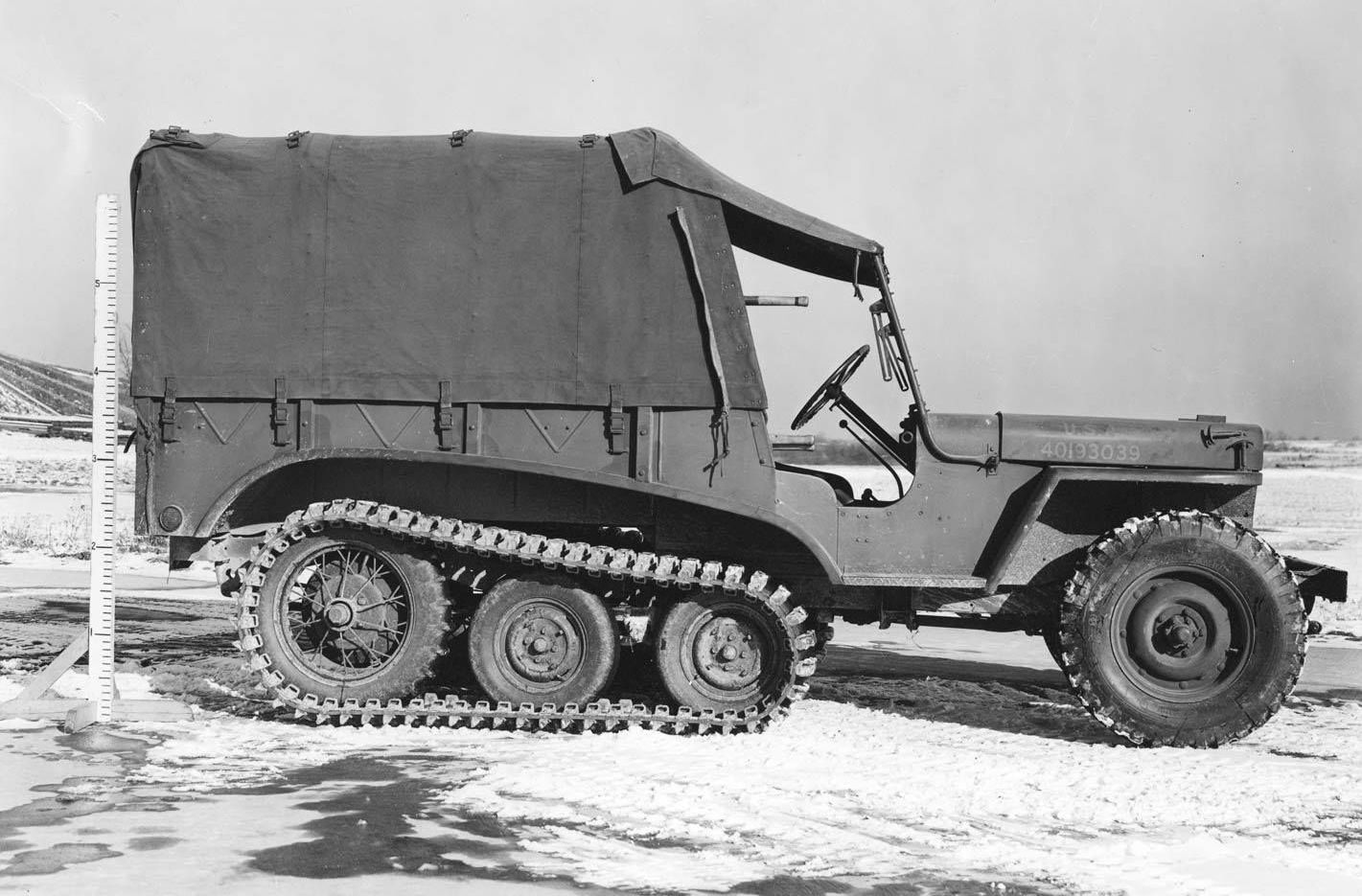
T28 experimental Willys MT based, half-track litter-carrier.

==== Tracked jeeps ====
Several tracked jeep prototypes were built because of such a need in Alaska and Canada. After America entered the war, a Japanese attack on the Aleutians suddenly made the Alaskan military base a zone of great military importance. The snow-rich circumstances created a need for tracked, jeep-like, all-purpose vehicles, and the Canadian Bombardier company and Willys created the T29 jeep half-track out of one of the existing 6×6 Willys MT chassis. The T-29 "Snow Tractor" (Jan 1943) expanded the rear chassis to a total of six wheels: three on each side, with a broad rubber belt serving as a track, running around two Ford Model A wheels, followed by a notably larger wheel at each back corner. Instead of front wheels, the rig got skis, and the front-wheel driveline was omitted to save cost and weight. It was followed up with the T29E1, on which front wheels returned, but mounted on the front skis, and still non-driven, just so that the front could now both glide and roll.

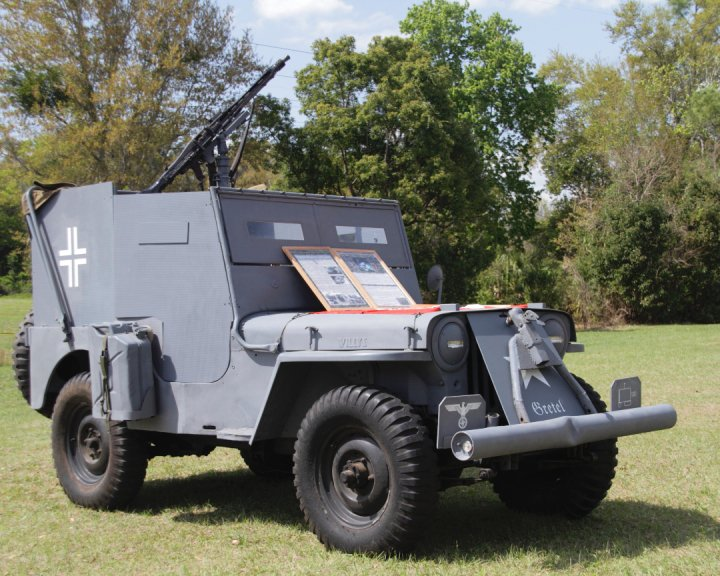
America tested armoring jeeps for reconnaissance (reenactment car).

Due to Willys' workload, International Harvester helped assemble a further five T29E1 prototypes. Under the steering front wheels, skis could be mounted or removed. An Aberdeen test report critiqued that the T-29E1 was difficult to steer, as the tracks could not be controlled independently, and that prolonged use caused excessive track component wear. A completely rearranged rear was then proposed, and a T28 litter-carrier was completed for testing by August 1944. The only known surviving half-track WWII jeep is a Willys T28 named "Penguin." Further (fully) tracked "jeeps" were also armored, and developed for, and by Canada (see armored jeeps).

==== Armored jeeps ====
Many jeeps received added armor in the field, especially in Europe in 1944–1945. Frequently, a rear slanting armor plate was added in front of the grille, replacing the windshield, as well as the sides, in place of where doors would be.

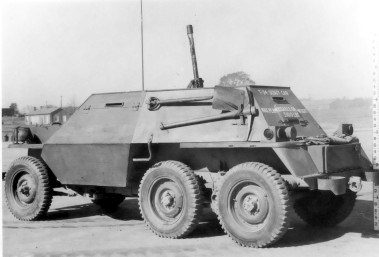
The T24 Scout Car was built on a 6×6 Willys MT "Super-Jeep" chassis.

Since reconnaissance was one of the jeep's primary purposes, there was a demand for some armor from the start of production. Starting in April 1942, the second T14 GMC 6×6 Willys MT-Tug chassis was converted to the T24 Scout Car. Though performing well in trials, the T24 was abandoned in the autumn in favor of the M8 & M20 Light Armored Car. Concurrently, the Ordnance Corps was pushed to work on a lightly armored reconnaissance design, based on the standard Willys 4×4 jeep. Different armor configurations were tested on the T25 through T25E3 prototypes, respectively.

Canada created a light, tracked, armored, and armed vehicle using Jeep automotive components. In late 1942, the Canadian Department of National Defence (DND)'s Directorate of Vehicles and Artillery (DVA) began work at No.1 Proving Ground in Ottawa on a small tracked vehicle successively named: 'Bantam Armoured Tracked Vehicle', the 'Light Recce Tank', and finally: the 'Tracked Jeep', TJ.

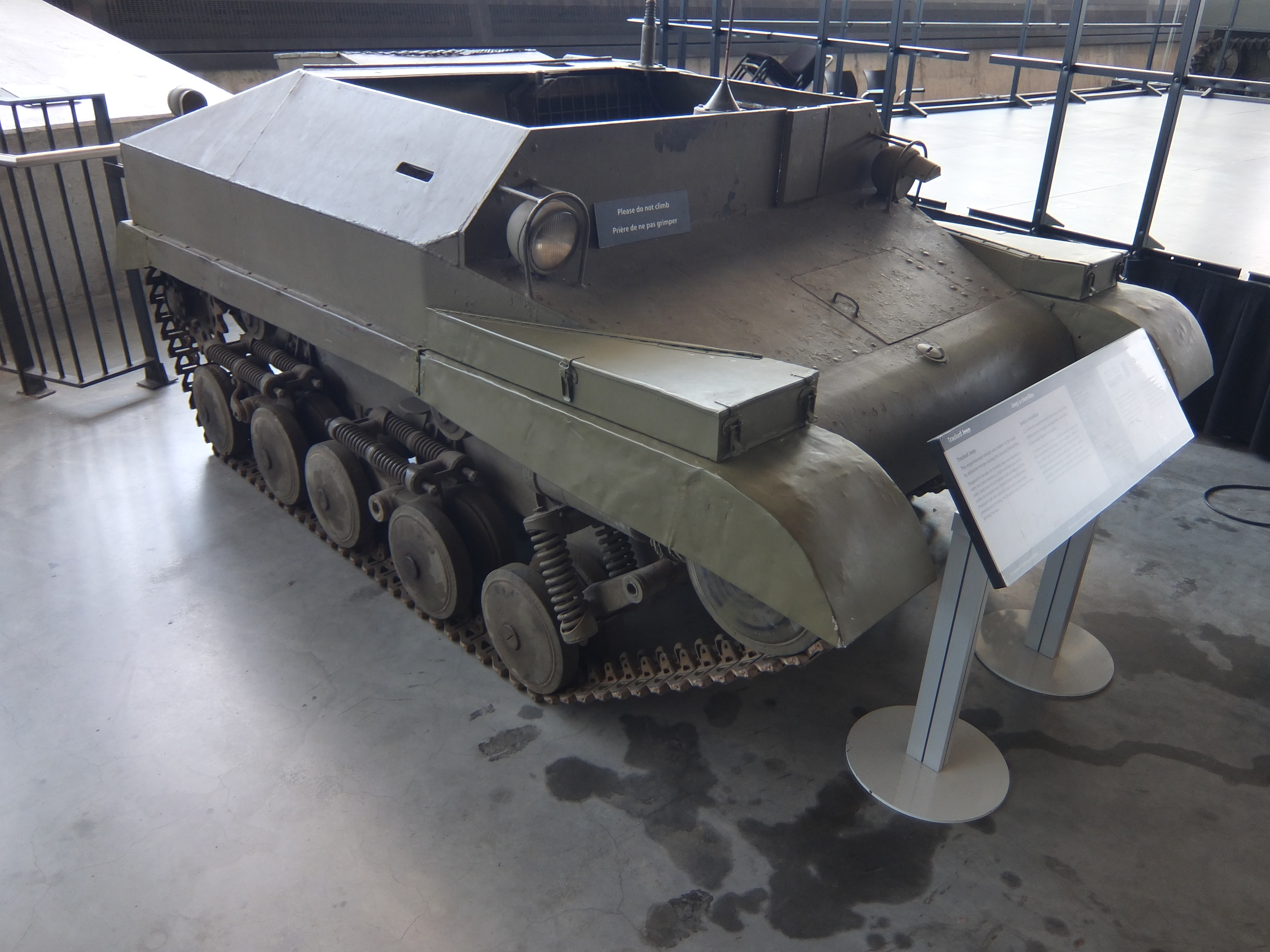
The Canadian "Tracked Jeep" Mk . 1 in the Canadian War Museum.

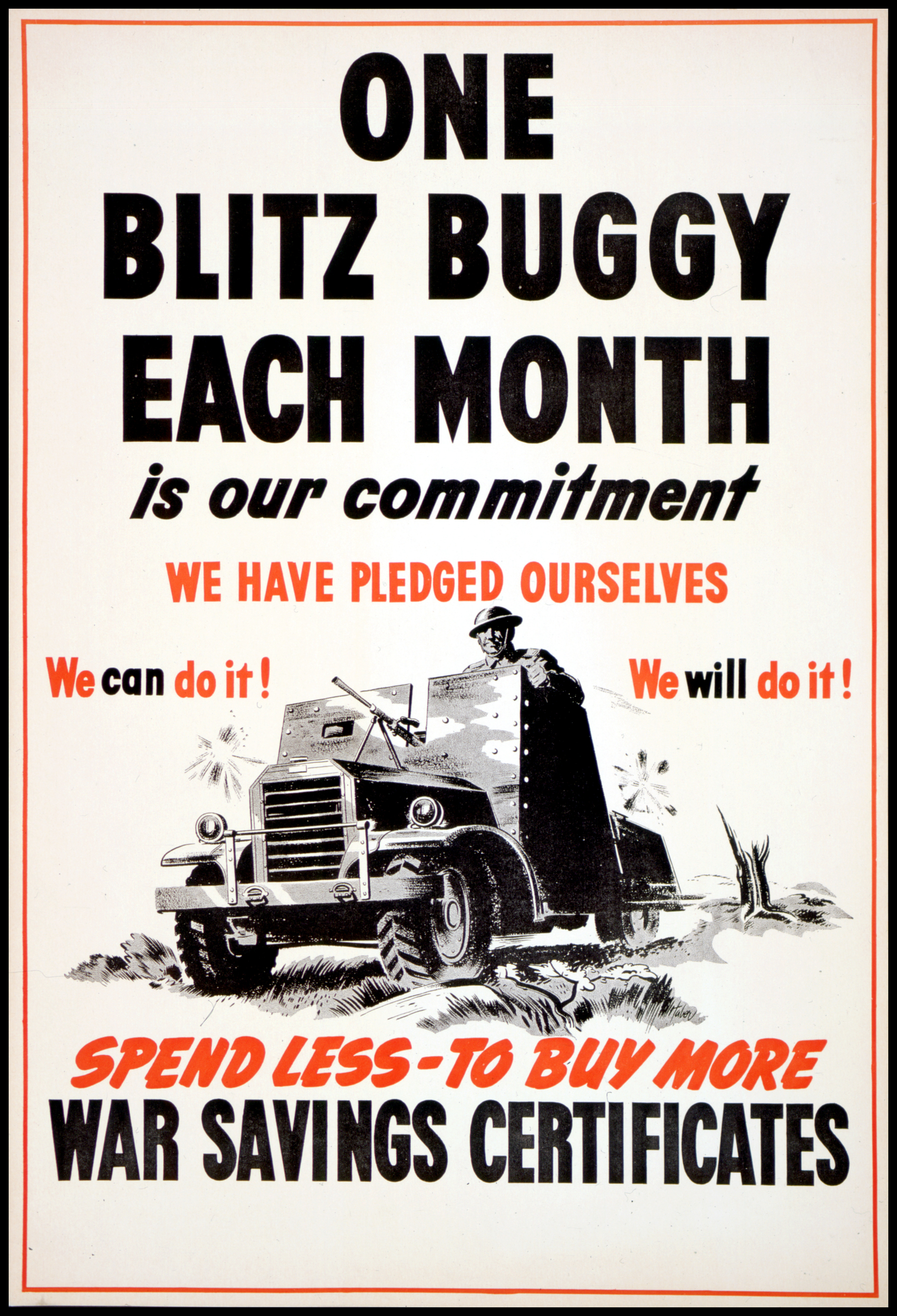
Canadian WWII poster for savings certificates. The vehicle resembles a British Standard Beaverette armored car

The Canadian "Tracked Jeep" Mk.1 measured 2.83 m (111 in) long, and 1.70 m (67 in) wide, by 1.28 m (50 in) high; it had a maximum armor of 12 mm (1/2-inch), and aimed at top speeds of 56 km/h (35 mph) on land and 8 km/h (5 mph) in the water. The vehicle was intended for taking messages over contested ground, armored reconnaissance, and engaging unarmored enemy troops in airborne and combined operations. Willys and Marmon-Herrington were contracted for five more prototypes, Willys for power train components, and MH for the armored hulls and the Hotchkiss-type running gear. The Tracked Jeep showed excellent cross-country performance, and uphill mobility was better than other light tracked utility vehicles, while its amphibious capability was adequate, despite its low freeboard. There were, however, serious shortcomings with the running-gear and tracks. Work to fix this delayed testing until late 1944, and British insights demanded such fundamental changes that a Mk . 2 version was developed, of which another six units were fabricated, and not ready until after the war had ended. The problems with tracks and running gear were still not sorted out, and development halted.

==== Flying jeep ====
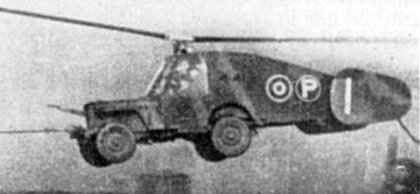
Hafner Rotabuggy in flight

The most extreme concept tried was to turn the jeep into a rotor kite (or gyrokite), similar to an autogyro—the Hafner Rotabuggy (officially Malcolm Rotaplane). Designed by Raoul Hafner in 1942 and sponsored by the Airborne Forces Experimental Establishment (AFEE), after their Rotachute enjoyed some success, a passive rotor assembly was added over the jeep cabin, along with a lightweight tail, for stabilization. This jeep could be towed into the air by a transport or bomber tug. The Rotabuggy would then be towed to the drop zone as a rotary-wing glider. It took until autumn 1944 to achieve a decent test flight, and other military gliders (particularly the Waco Hadrian and Airspeed Horsa) made the Rotabuggy superfluous. Incidentally, it was first named the "Blitz Buggy," but that was soon dropped for "Rotabuggy".

== Etymology ==
There is no consensus among historians as to how the U.S. Army's World War II quarter-ton reconnaissance car became known as the "jeep", let alone how the word originated in the first place. Explanations have proven difficult to verify. With certainty, the term "jeep" was already in use before the war, designating various things, while the "1/4‑ton trucks" at first had many different designations and nicknames.

Other contemporaneous jeeps

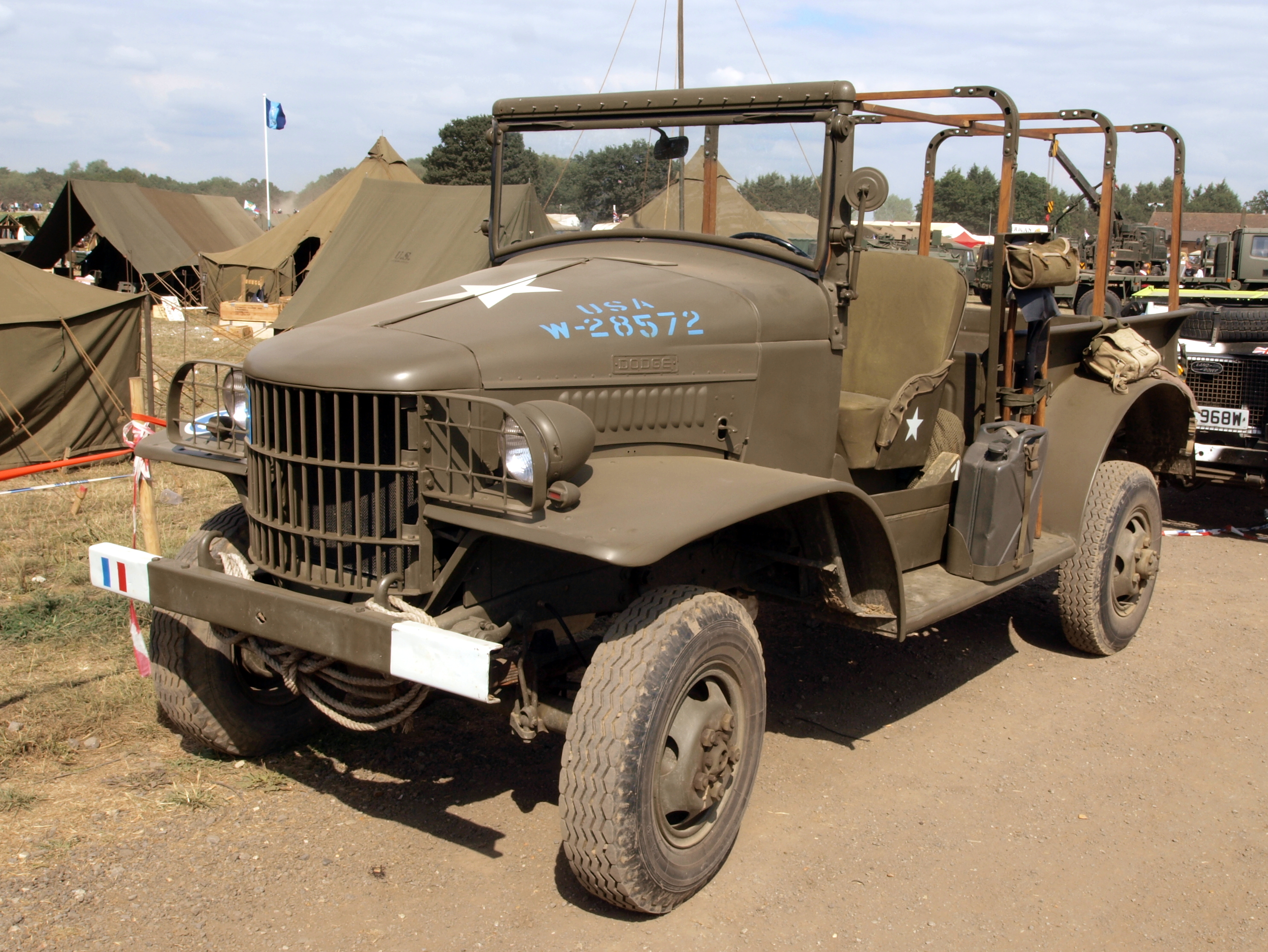
World War II soldiers and officials called the half-ton 1940 / 1941 Dodge Reconnaissance / Weapon Carriers "Jeeps" through 1942, before the term moved to the Willys MB.

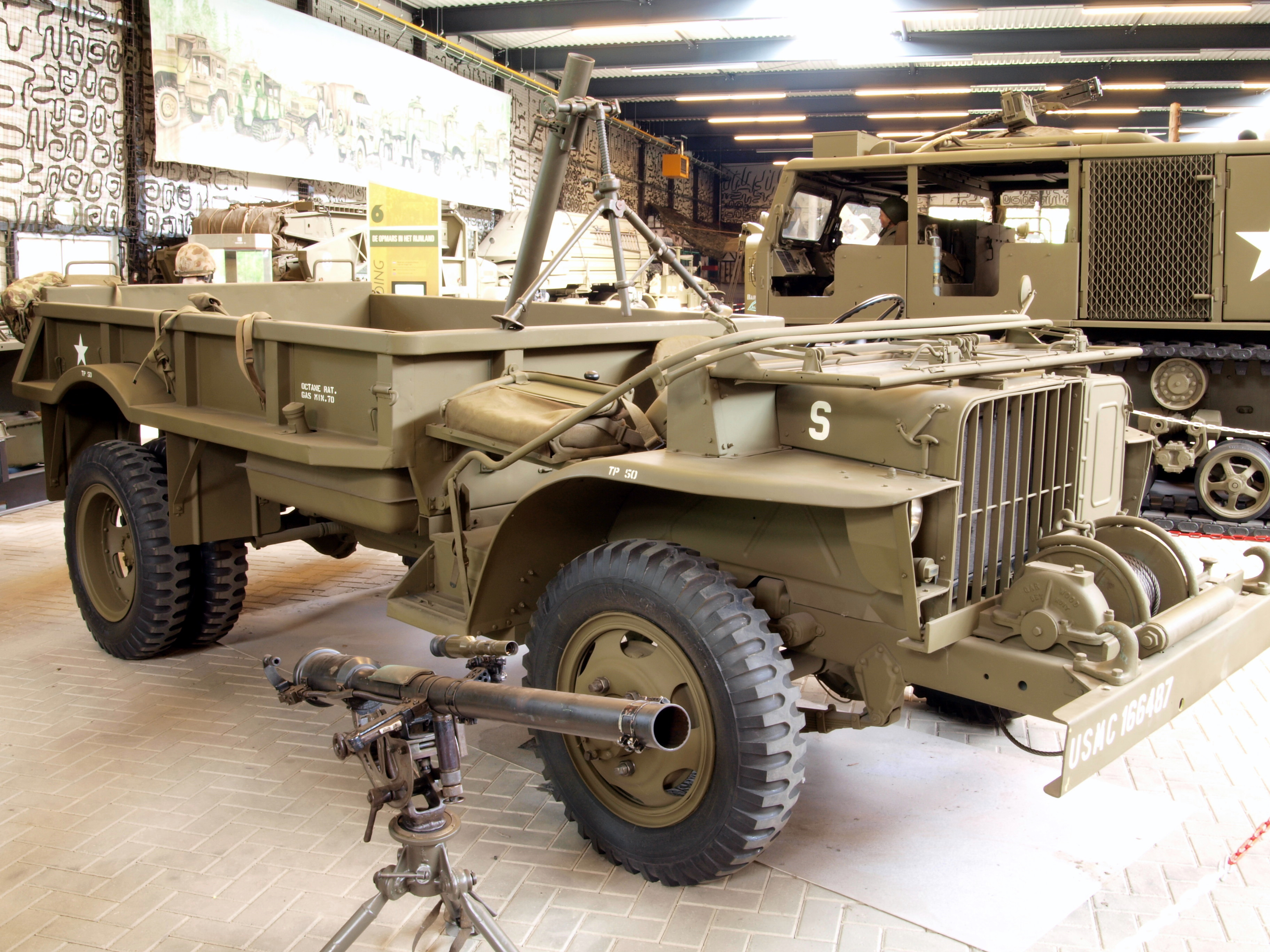
The compact Ford GTB / G-622 1 1/2‑ton 4x4 truck, introduced in late 1942, was still typically nicknamed 'Burma jeep'.

=== Eugene the Jeep and prior usage of "jeep" ===
According to several knowledgeable authors, the word "jeep" was used well before World War II; career soldiers used it since World War I – both as casual U.S. Army slang for new, uninitiated recruits or other personnel who still had to prove their mettle, as well as used by Army motor pool mechanics, about any new, unproven vehicles or prototypes. Zaloga also describes use as an adjective: "jeepy," similar to "cooky" or "goofy," to mean anything insignificant, silly, awkward or foolish.

Later, in mid-March 1936, a character called Eugene the Jeep was created in E. C. Segar's Popeye cartoons. Eugene the Jeep was Popeye's "jungle pet" and was small, able to walk through walls and move between dimensions, and could go anywhere and solve seemingly impossible problems. The Eugene cartoon character brought new meaning to the Jeep name, diverging from the initial, somewhat pejorative meaning of the term, instead changing the slang to mean a capable person or thing. King Features Syndicate, publisher of the "Thimble Theater" comics that featured Popeye and Eugene the Jeep, trademarked the name "Jeep" in August 1936.

Eugene the Jeep's go-anywhere ability resulted in various industrial and four-wheel-drive vehicles getting nicknamed "Jeep" in the late 1930s. Around 1940, converted 4WD Minneapolis-Moline tractors, supplied to the U.S. Army as prime movers, were called "jeeps," (Note: Coincidentally, Willys had owned Moline, but sold it long before the war.) and Halliburton used the name for an electric logging device, or for a custom-built four wheel drive exploration/survey vehicle. A small, anti-submarine, escort aircraft carrier was called a "jeep carrier" in the U.S. Navy in WWII, and also several aircraft; prototypes for both Kellett autogyros, and for the Boeing B-17 Flying Fortress, as well as the 1941 Curtiss-Wright AT-9 were called "jeeps." Additionally, in 1936/1937, Canadian soldiers had received a 1/2‑ton Marmon-Herrington half-track and called it a "Jeep" (with a capital "J").

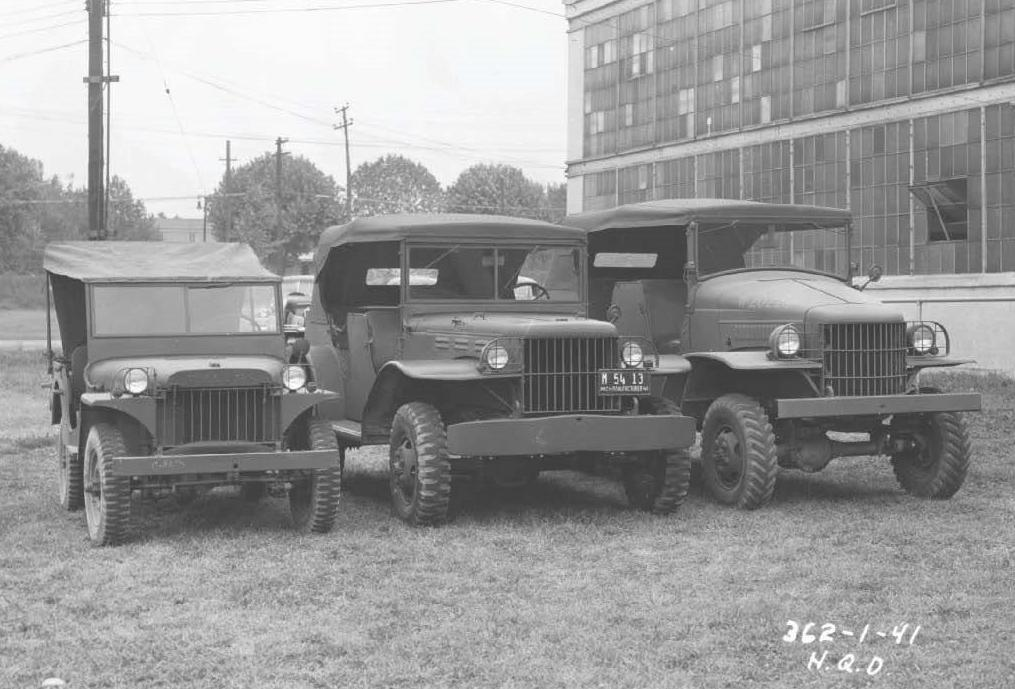
All three light U.S. 4×4 trucks, nicknamed "jeeps" in World War II. From left to right: Willys MA 1/4‑ton, Dodge WC 3/4‑ton, Dodge WC 1/2‑ton.

In 1940–1942, soldiers initially used "jeep" for half-ton or three-quarter-ton Dodge Command Reconnaissance cars, with the three-quarter ton Command Cars later called "beeps" (for "big Jeeps"), while the quarter-ton cars were called "peeps," "son of jeep," "baby jeep," "puddle-jumper," "bug"; or "bantams" or "quads." A seven-page article in Popular Science (October 1941) headlined introducing the quarter-ton as "Leaping Lena"—also one of the nicknames of the ubiquitous, same length Ford Model T—and further called it a buggy, or just a bug. Originally, "peep" seemed a fitting name, because the quarter-ton was considered primarily a reconnaissance (peeping) car.

The early 1940s terminology situation is summed up in the definition given in Words of the Fighting Forces by Clinton A. Sanders, a dictionary of military slang published in 1942, in the Pentagon library: "Jeep: A four-wheel drive car of one-half to one-and-one-half-ton capacity for reconnaissance or other army duty. A term applied to the bantam cars, and occasionally to other motor vehicles (U.S.A.) in the Air Corps, the Link Trainer; in the armored forces, the 1/2 ton command car. Also referred to as 'any small plane, helicopter, or gadget'." The term "Jeep" could still mean various things, including light wheeled utility vehicles other than the jeep.

Moreover, in April 1942, the Sarasota Herald-Tribune reported that the Army was still "hopelessly divided" on how to define "jeep" or "peep". Despite opening with the definition of the lexicographer Dr. Charles E. Funk of the United Service Organizations (U.S.O.), identical to the above ("jeep: a four-wheel drive car of one-half to one-and-one-half-ton capacity for reconnaissance or other army duty"), a survey of Army camp editors in thirty states, conducted by the NCCS branch of the U.S.O. revealed that less than 25% agreed with that meaning for posterity. Twenty-six percent of camp editors still called the small combat rigs "Bantam cars," and 28% used names or definitions not even listed in the questionnaire. Ten percent considered that "jeeps are not peeps", whereas 6.6% contradicted that they are. "In May of 1942, newspapers announced the armored division [still] officially named the quarter-ton command/reconnaissance car the 'Peep', while the half-ton armored [division] car was called the 'Jeep'." The Milwaukee Journal published two photos to help readers distinguish between the two. In May 1942, an article in the Pittsburgh Press confirmed that the Army had legitimized the slang terms "jeep" and "peep" as words used by the Army, in official orders.

=== Relation with presence of light 4WDs in numbers ===
In the first years of the war, this usage of the term 'jeep' logically meshes with the ratios of U.S. light wheeled military truck production. In 1940, the U.S. government took delivery of 8,058 light trucks, 6,583 of which were 1/2‑tons, 4×4, Dodge G-505 VC- and WC-models (82%). The 1/4‑ton jeep was yet to be designed. The half-tons provoked two insights: the military wanted many more, but also needed another vehicle – even smaller, lighter, and more agile. In 1941, Dodge ramped up the 1/2‑ton WC-series, delivering some 60,000 units, compared to some 15,000 quarter tons, almost all still early production units, built by three different manufacturers. Even in 1942, when production of the standardized 1/4‑ton jeep really got up to speed, it didn't catch up to the WC-series' numbers—the 170,000 jeeps built still only amounted to half of the total 356,000 light trucks the Army had received by the end of that year. It took until early 1943 for the Ford and Willys jeeps to outnumber the 1/2‑ton and 3/4‑ton Dodge WC models in service.

The 1943 short film The Autobiography of a 'Jeep', by the U.S. Office of War Information, narrated the jeep's story up til then from its own view.

=== Whether "jeep" was derived from "GP" ===
One of the most frequently given explanations is that the designation "GP" was slurred into the word "Jeep," in the same way that the contemporary HMMWV (for "High-Mobility Multi-purpose Wheeled Vehicle") has become known as the "Humvee"—either from the initial Ford model "GP", or from the military "G.P.", for "General Purpose" (vehicle).

An explanation, based on the Ford "GP" model code, was given in an article in the San Francisco Call-Bulletin in late 1941. It is possible that "GP" evolved into "Geep" and then "jeep."

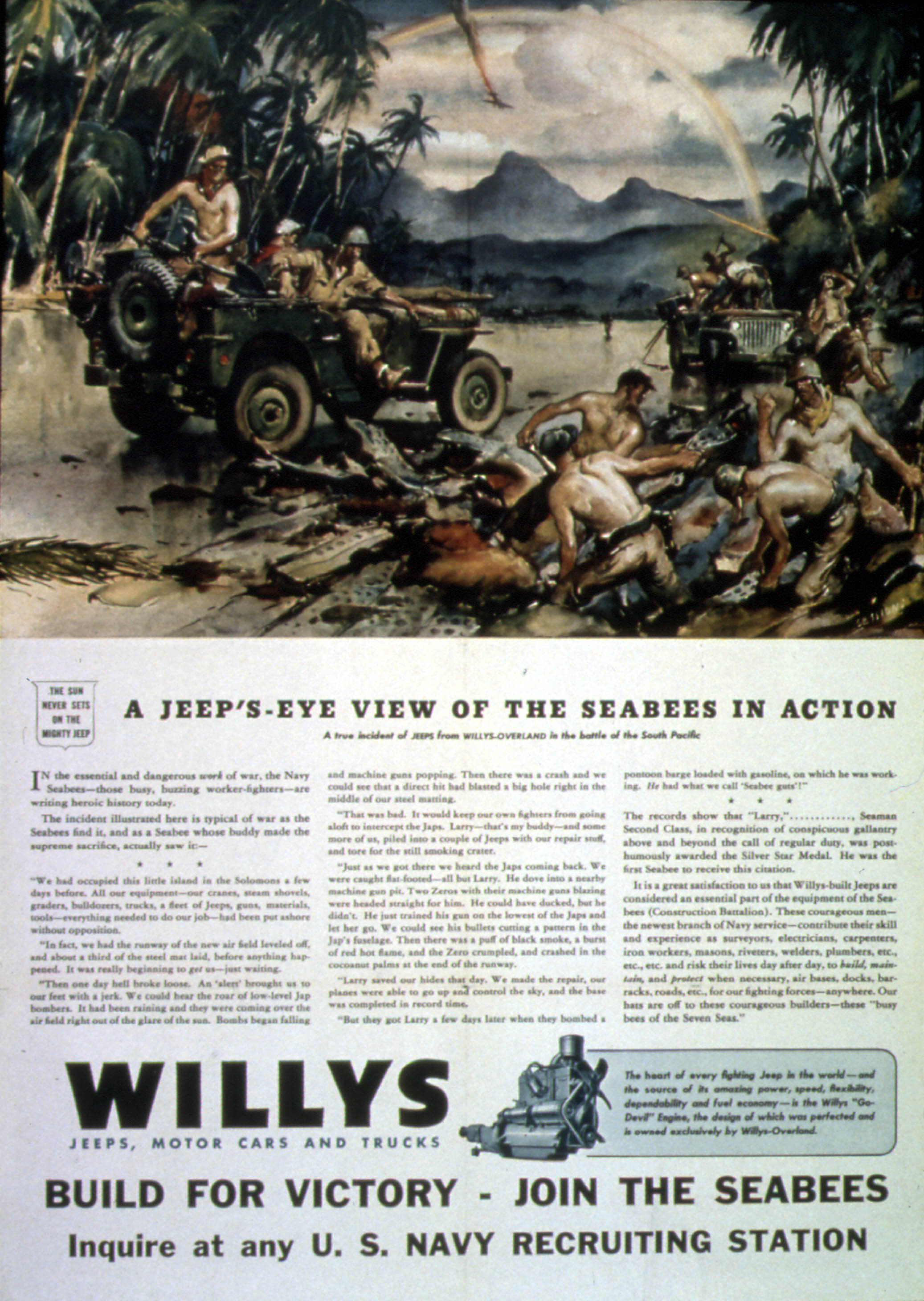
Willys wartime ad promoting the Jeeps' contribution to the war effort – in particular used by the Seabees (Note: "Larry" is Seaman 2/c Lawrence Meyer, the first Seabee to receive the Silver Star at the Battle of Guadalcanal.)

The latter "GP"-based explanation appears in the TM9-803 Manual, and the car is designated a "GP" in the TM9-2800 Manual—these were published in late 1943 and early 1944. In the 1943 short propaganda/documentary film The Autobiography of a 'Jeep', by the U.S. Office of War Information, the jeep itself propagates this origin story of its nickname.

=== Willys-Overland's positions and promotion ===
Joseph W. Frazer, president of Willys-Overland from 1939 until 1944, claimed to have coined the word jeep by slurring the initials G.P., possibly related to Willys-Overland's 1943 trademark and 1946 copyright claims to the Jeep name. However, the company handling Willys' public relations in 1944 wrote that the jeep name probably came from the fact that the vehicle made quite an impression on soldiers at the time, so much so that they informally named it after the go-anywhere Eugene the Jeep.

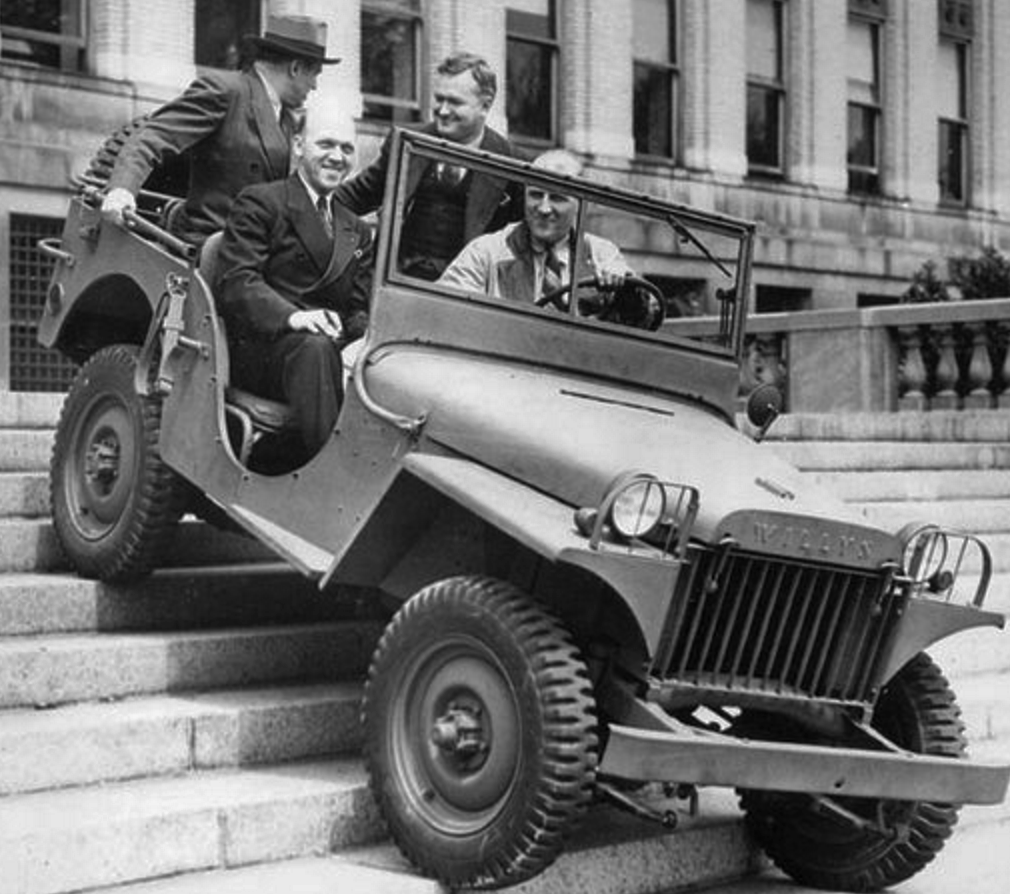
In 1941, Willys publicly showed off their MA's off-road capabilities, like by stair-climbing on Capitol Hill

In early 1941, when the test cars went by names like BRC / "Blitz-Buggy", Ford Pygmy, and others, Willys-Overland staged a press event in Washington, D.C., a publicity stunt and Senate photo opportunity demonstrating the car's off-road capability by driving it up and down the U.S. Capitol steps. Irving "Red" Hausmann, a test driver on the Willys development team who had accompanied the car for its testing at Camp Holabird, had heard soldiers there referring to it as a jeep. He was enlisted to go to the event and give a demonstration ride to a group of dignitaries, including Katherine Hillyer, a reporter for the Washington Daily News. When asked what it was, Hausmann said, "It's a Jeep". Hausmann preferred "Jeep" to distinguish the Willys rig from the other funny-named quarter tons at Camp Holabird. Hillyer's syndicated article appeared in the newspaper on 20 February 1941, with a photo showing a jeep going up the Capitol steps and a caption including the term "jeep". This is believed to be the most likely origin of the term being fixed in public awareness. Even though Hausmann did not create or invent the word "Jeep", he likely contributed to its mainstream media usage, indicating the quarter-ton vehicle.

=== Convergence from mixed origins and media coverage ===
It is plausible that the origin was mixed and converged on "jeep" from multiple directions. Ford Motor Company pushed its Ford GP hard to get the military contract, putting the term "GP" into use. Military officers and G.I.s involved in the procurement and testing of the car may have called it a jeep from the WWI slang. Civilian contractors, engineers, and testers may have related it to Popeye's "Eugene the Jeep" character. People may have heard the same name from different directions, and as one person heard it from another, they put their own understanding and explanation on it. Overwhelming presence of the nickname 'jeep' in the public's opinion was probably the deciding factor.

From 1941 on, a "constant flow of press and film publicity", as well as Willys advertising as of 1942, proclaiming it had created and perfected the jeep, cemented the name "Jeep" in the civilian public's mind, even when "peep" was still used at many army camps, and President Roosevelt spoke of the vital role the "peep" had to play in defending the shores of Fort Story, Virginia (04-1942).

One other particularly influential article may have been the January 1942 complete review of the military's new wonder buggy in Scientific American, reprinted as "Meet the Jeep" in Reader's Digest, the best-selling consumer magazine of the day. Author Jo Chamberlin was duly impressed by the "midget combat car" and wrote:

Our Army's youngest, smallest toughest baby has a dozen pet names such as jeep, peep, blitz-buggy, leaping Lena, panzer-killer. The names are all affectionate, for the jeep has made good. Only a year old, it stole the show in Louisiana. Now the Army plans to have 75,000 of them.

In a prescient footnote, Chamberlin wrote: "Some army men call the bantam a "peep", reserving "jeep" for the larger command car in which the brass hats ride. However, the term 'jeep' (born of GP, an auto manufacturing classification) is used by newspapers and most soldiers, and apparently will stick'".

== Grille ==
Willys made its first 25,000 MB Jeeps with a welded flat iron "slat" radiator grille. It was Ford who first designed and implemented the now familiar and distinctive stamped, vertical-slot steel grille into its vehicles, which was lighter, used fewer resources, and was less costly to produce. Along with many other design features innovated by Ford, this was incorporated into the design and implemented by April 1942.

To get their grille design trademarked, Willys gave their post-war jeeps a seven-slot grille instead of the Ford nine-slot design. This applies both to Willys' "Civilian Jeeps", as well as the M38 and M38A1 military models. Through a series of corporate takeovers and mergers, AM General Corporation ended up with the rights to use the seven-slot grille.

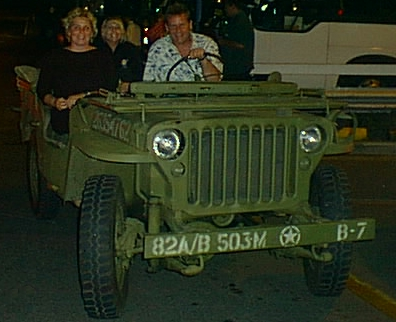
Ford design, stamped steel, nine-slot grille on a 1945 Willys MB

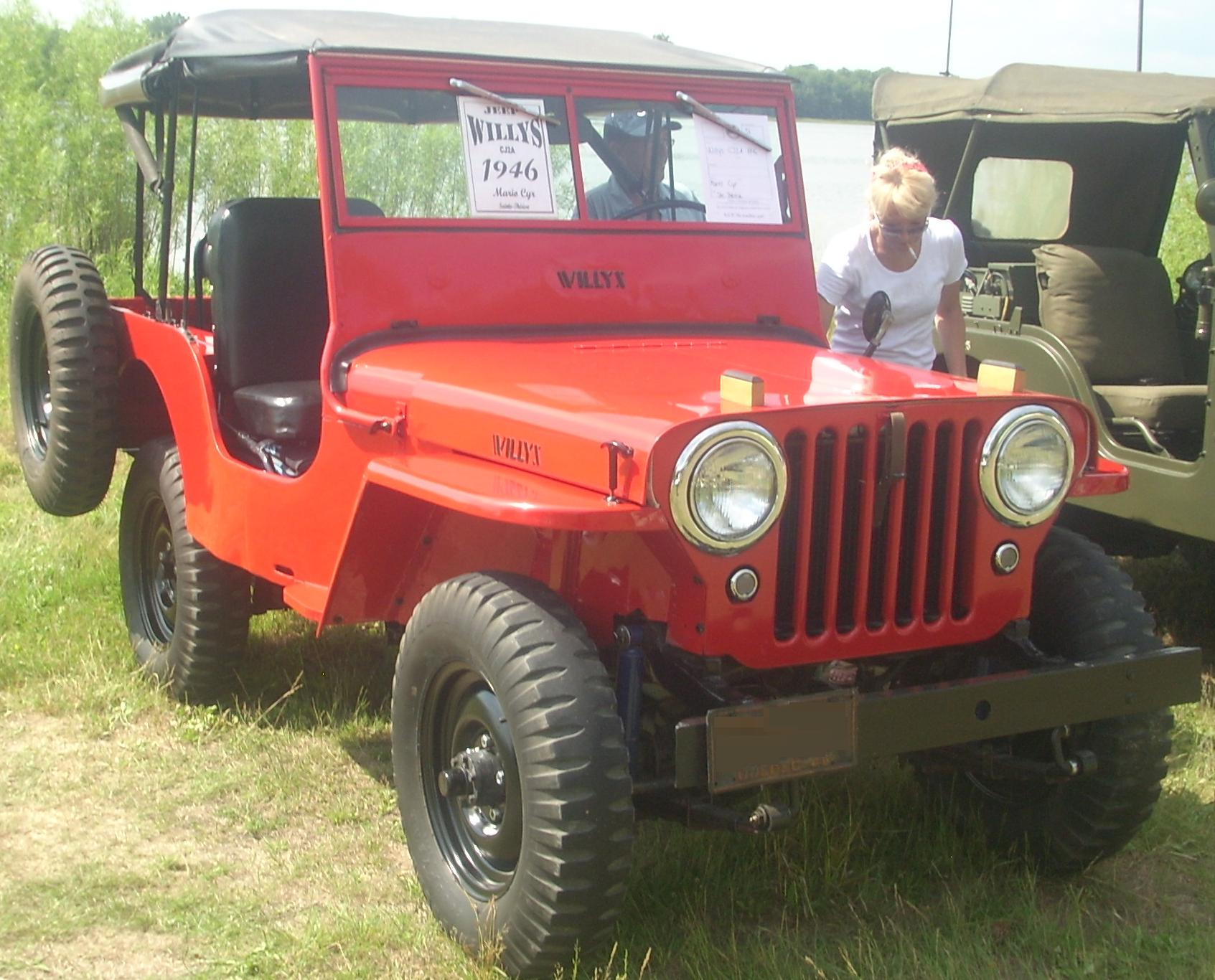
Seven-slot grille on the CJ-2A, Willys' first civilian Jeep

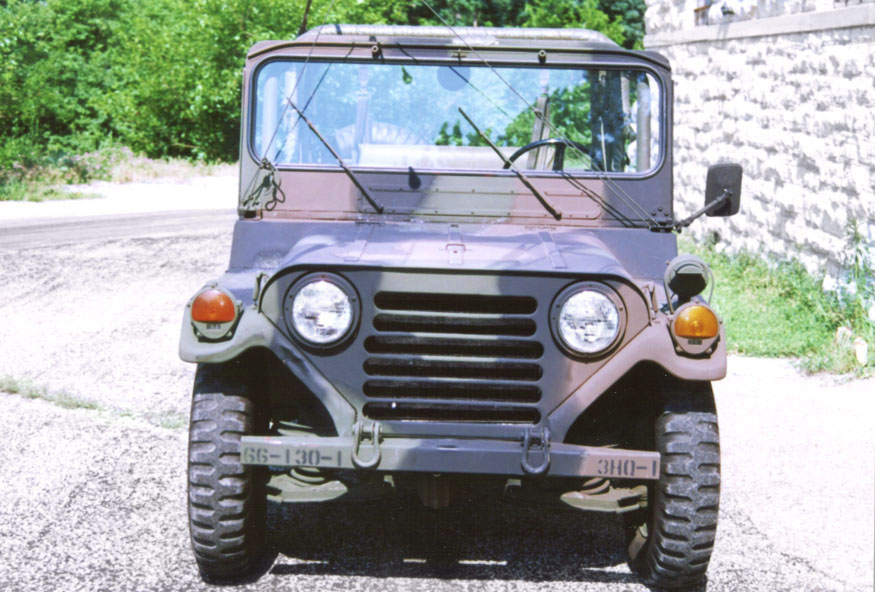
Due to Willys' trademark, Ford had to use a different design on their M151 ¼-ton 4×4 utility truck, opting for horizontal slots.

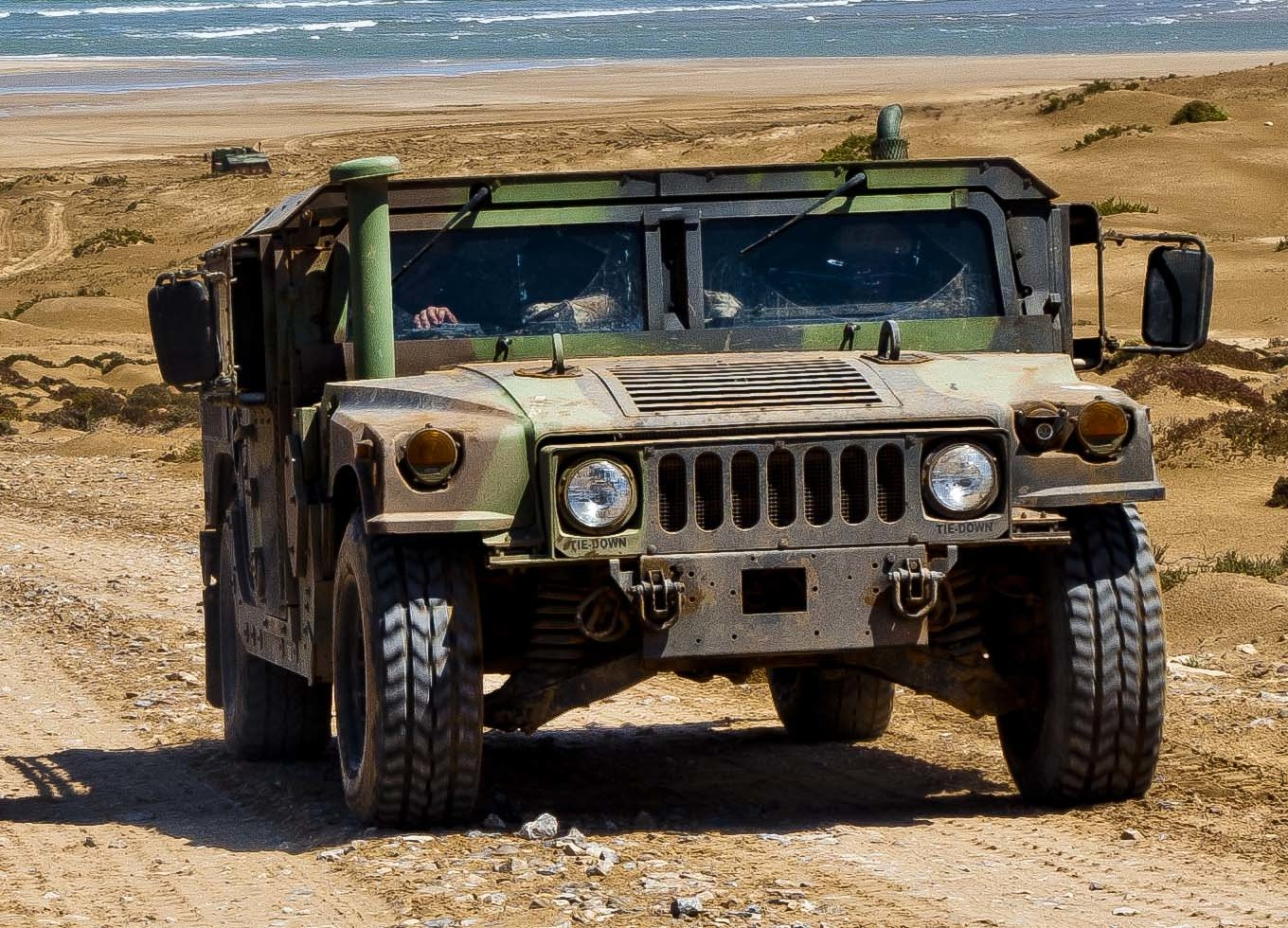
Through corporate history, the Humvee manufacturer AM General also had rights to fit the seven-slot grille.

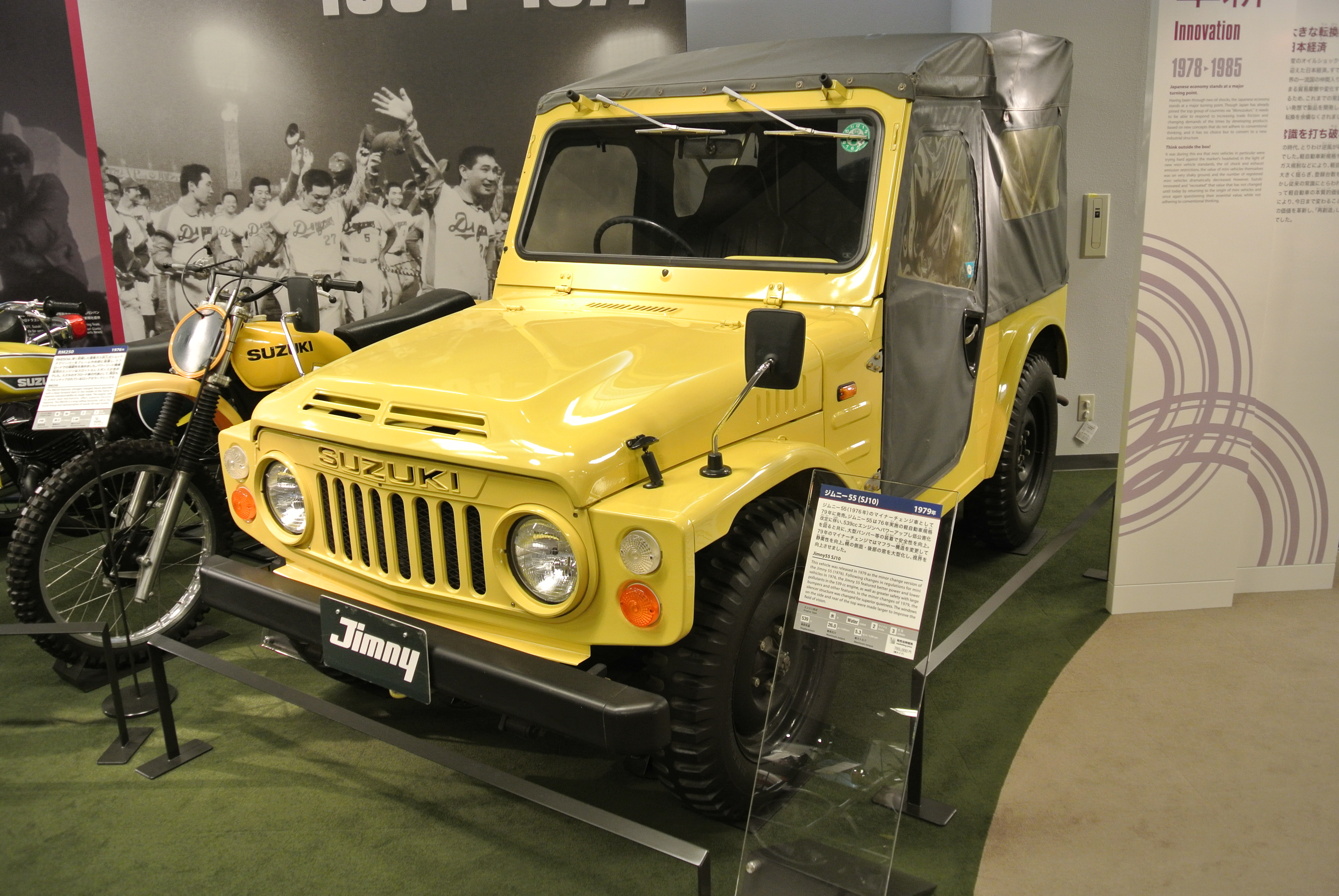
Other manufacturers used slotted grilles on their vehicles, in this case a 1st generation Suzuki Jimny.

== Service ==
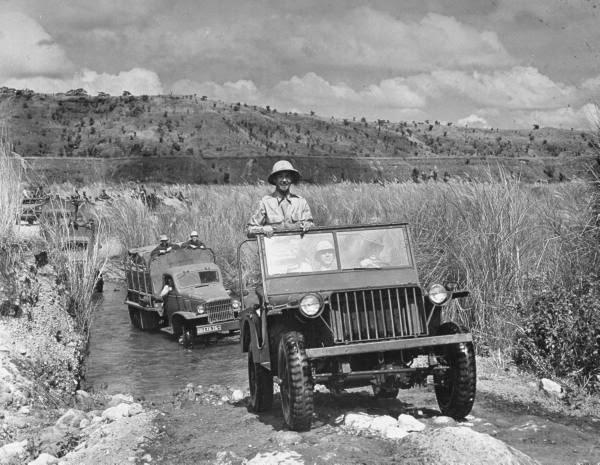
Early production 1/4‑tons like this American Bantam BRC-40 in the Philippines, were the first to see action, with allied British or Soviet forces (1941).

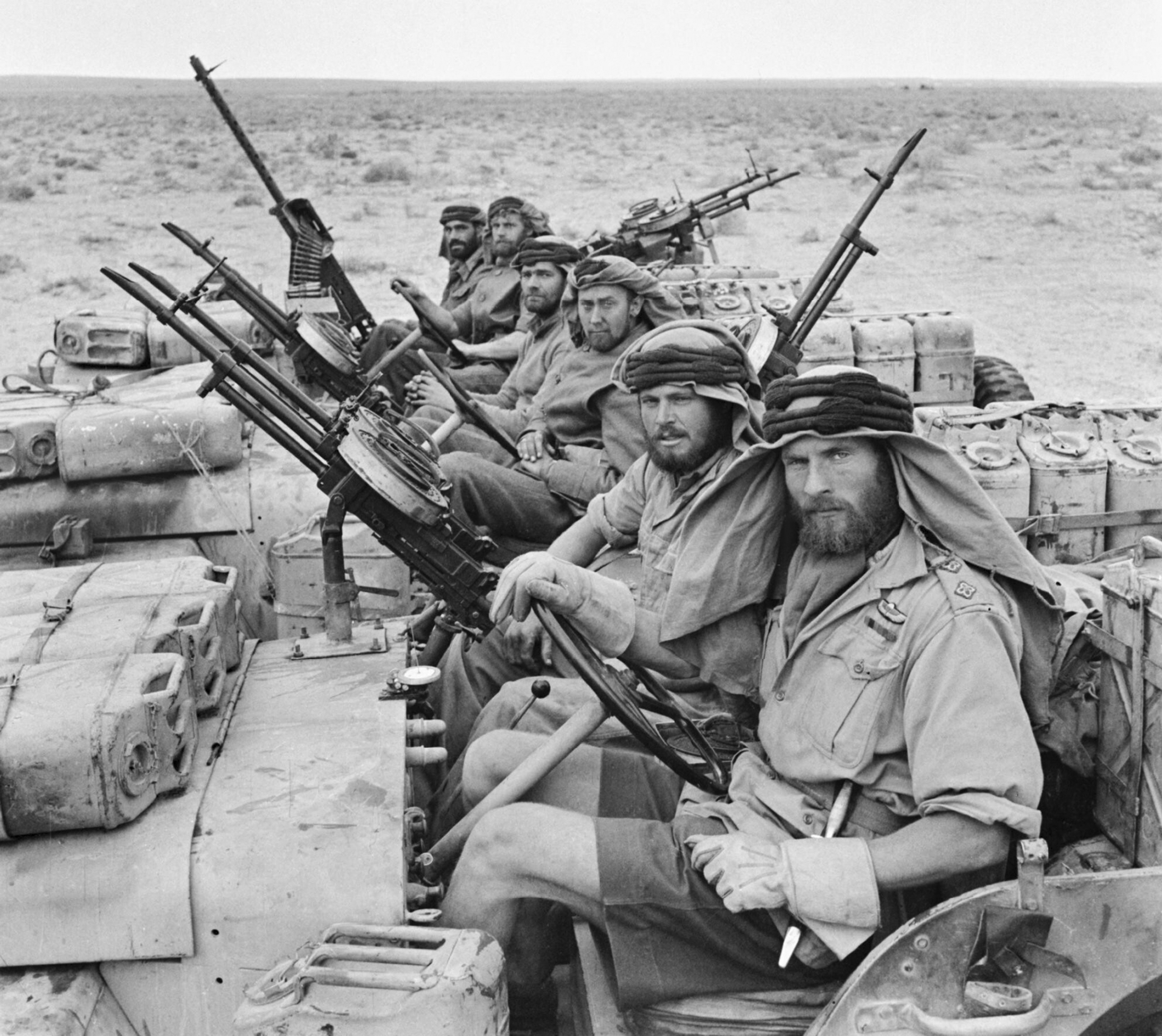
The British Special Air Service used heavily armed jeeps in North Africa missions.

External image
- Over flat terrain, the jeep would transport up to six soldiers} with backpacks, if necessary.

The United States provided jeeps to almost all of the Allies in World War II. Britain, Canada, (Note: Canadian utility vehicle production during the war included some 800,000 (mainly) right-hand drive Canadian Military Pattern light and medium trucks from 1/2 ton upwards – for British and Commonwealth as well as Soviet use – but 1/4‑ton jeeps.) Australia, India, the Free French, USSR, and China all received jeeps, mainly under the American Lend-Lease program. Some 182,500 units were provided to Allies under Lend-Lease alone. Almost 105,000 to the British Empire, (Note: U.S. report terminology) including Australia and India, plus over 8,000 to Canada, and some 50,000 to the Soviet Union. The Free French (almost 10,000) and China (nearly 7,000) were medium takers, and many other countries received a small number. America shipped a total of 77,972 various "jeeps" to the Soviet Union – consisting of 49,250 1/4‑tons, (Note: Including early production models.) 25,200 Dodge 3/4‑tons, (Note: Almost all WC-51/WC-52 Troop & Weapons Carriers) and 3,520 Ford GPA.

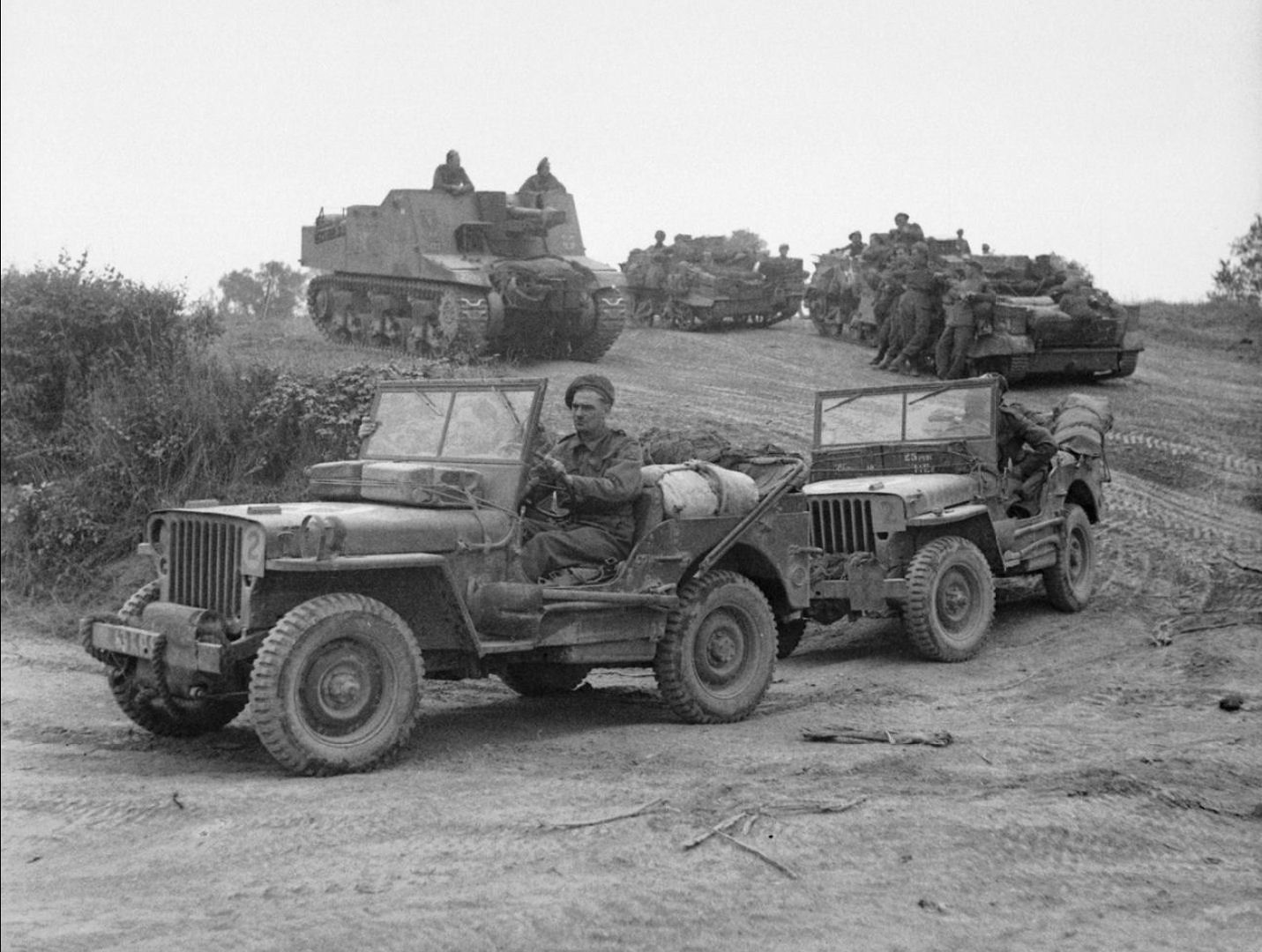
Two jeeps leading a British column of Universal Carriers and a Sexton self-propelled gun. Caen, 1944

In the deserts of the North African campaign, the jeep's abilities so far surpassed those of British vehicles that it wasn't unusual for jeeps to rescue a three-ton truck stuck in the sand. In combat, the British would use their modified jeeps in groups of up to fifty or sixty to raid Rommel's supply lines by surprise, exploiting the jeep's low silhouette; able to remain unseen, hide behind dunes, and surprise the enemy.

Within the U.S. military, jeeps were used by every branch. In the U.S. Army, an average of 145 units were assigned to each infantry regiment. Around the world, jeeps served in every overseas theater of operation, in every environment, under all weather and climatic conditions – in North Africa and the Pacific Theater, the Western Allied invasion of Europe in 1944, as well as the Eastern Front. From deserts to mountains, from jungles to beachheads, jeeps could be pulled out of thick mud by their riders, and they were even flown into battle on light glider planes. In the European theater, they were so ubiquitous that some German soldiers believed that each American soldier was issued their own jeep. (Note: By war's end, in 1945, in the European theater U.S. forces had close to one motor truck (jeeps included) for every four men – worldwide it had one vehicle per seven American GIs.)

Jeeps served as indefatigable pack horses for troop transport and towing supply trailers, carrying water, fuel, and ammunition, and pulling through the most challenging terrain. They performed nimble scout and reconnaissance duty, were frequent ambulances for the wounded, and did hearse service. They also doubled as mobile field command headquarters or weapons platforms – either with mounted machine guns or pulling small artillery pieces into "unreachable" areas over inhospitable terrain. The Jeep's flat hood was used as a commander's map table, a chaplain's field altar, the G.I.s' poker table, or even for field surgery. In the cauldron of war, the jeeps served every purpose imaginable: as a power plant, light source, improvised stove for field rations, or a hot water source for shaving. Equipped with the proper tools, it would plow snow or dig long furrows for laying heavy electrical cable along jungle airfields – laid by another jeep following it.

Battle-hardened warriors learned to weld a rooftop-height vertical cutter-bar to the front of their jeeps, to cut any trip wires tied across roads or trails by the Germans, placed to snap the necks of unsuspecting jeep drivers. Fitted with flanged steel wheels, they could pull railroad cars. In Europe, "The service of this vehicle was excellent, considering all the abuse it was obliged to take from bad roads, high speeds, overloading, and lack of maintenance. It performed tasks that it was never intended to perform, from carrying ammunition to locations where other wheeled vehicles could not travel, to serving as a cross-country ambulance traversing roads and country considered practically impassible." Pulitzer Prize–winning war journalist Ernie Pyle wrote: "It does everything. It goes everywhere. It's as faithful as a dog, as strong as a mule, and as agile as a goat. It constantly carries twice what it was designed for, and still keeps on going."

Despite some shortcomings, the jeep was generally well-liked, seen as versatile, maneuverable, reliable, and almost indestructible. The seats were found uncomfortable, sometimes caused the so-called "Jeep riders' disease" and cramped in the rear, but many soldiers enjoyed driving the nimble jeep, appreciating its powerful engine; and with its light weight, low-cut body sides, bucket seats, and manual floor-shifter, it was as close to a sportscar as most GIs had ever driven. Enzo Ferrari called the Jeep "America's only real sports car." Nazi generals admired the jeep more than any other U.S. materiel, and it was the vehicle they most liked to capture for general use.

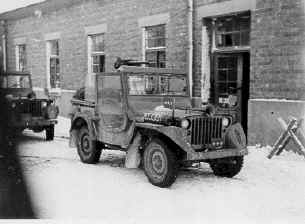
General George S. Patton's jeep – Bastogne, Belgium (1945)

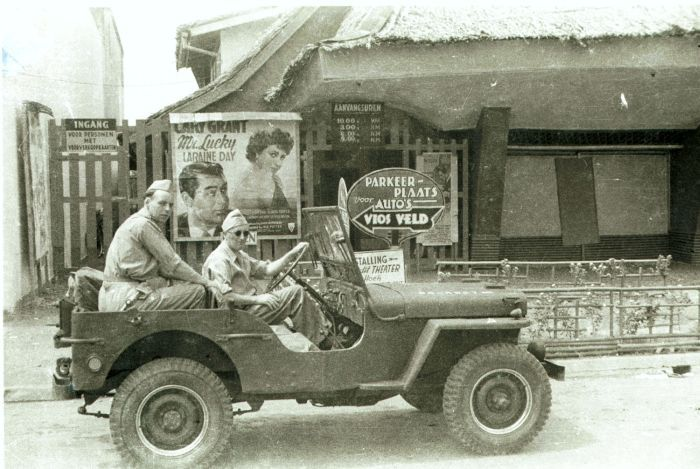
World War II jeeps in Batavia, Indonesia (1947).

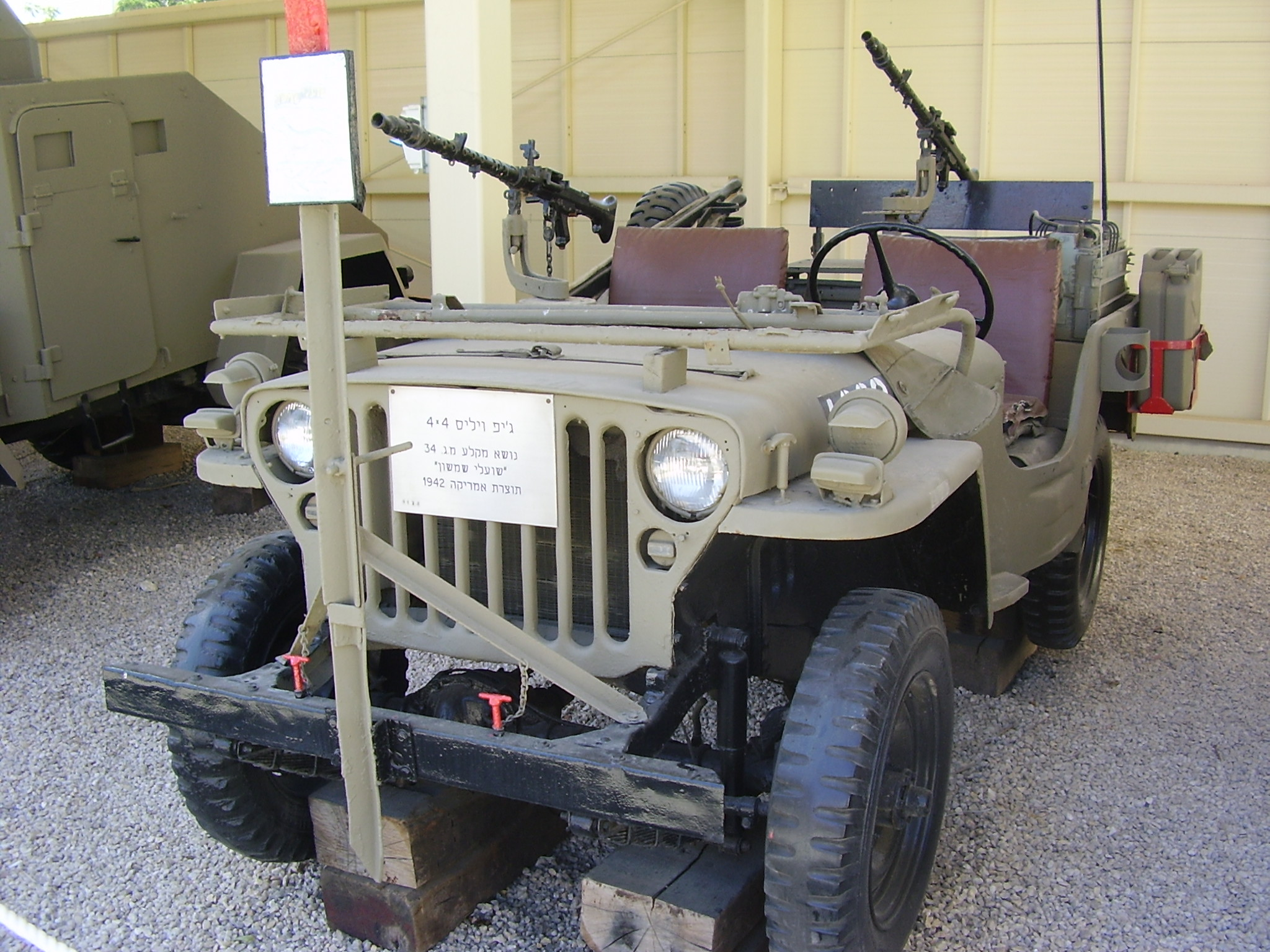
Wire catcher on front of improvised attack jeep, used by Samson's Foxes Israeli commando unit in the 1948 Arab–Israeli War

== Post-war ==
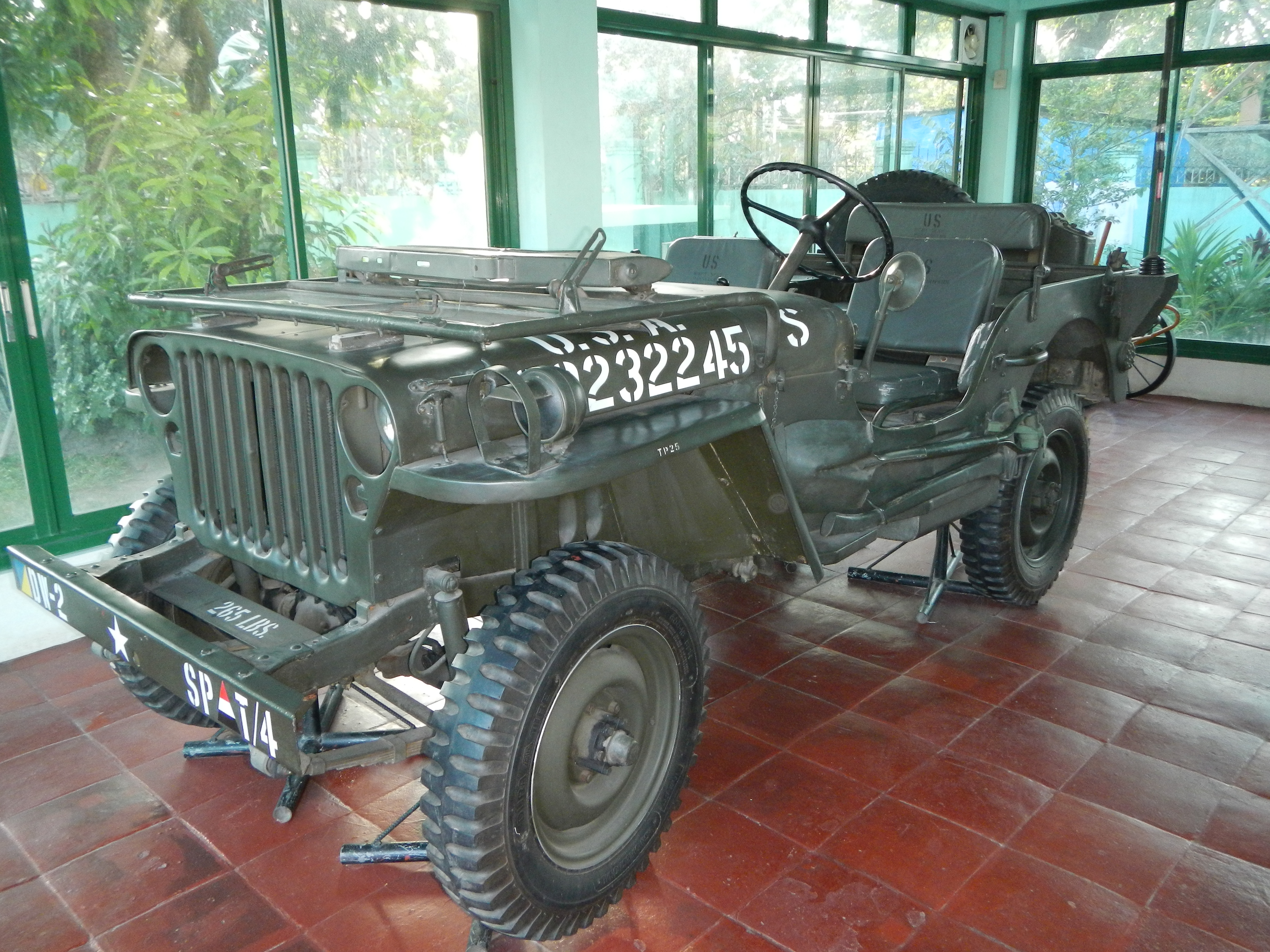
Willys MB used by former Philippine President Ramon Magsaysay

Willys-Overland filed to trademark the "Jeep" name in 1943. From 1945 onwards, Willys marketed its four-wheel drive vehicle to the public with its CJ (Civilian Jeep) versions, making these the world's first mass-produced 4WD civilian cars. Even before actual civilian purpose jeeps had been created, the 3 January 1944 issue of Life magazine featured a story titled: 'U.S. Civilians Buy Their First Jeeps'. A mayor from Kansas had bought a Ford GP in Chicago in 1943, and it performed invaluable work on his 2,000-acre farm.

Already in 1942, industrial designer Brooks Stevens came up with an idea to make a civilian car called the Victory Car on the jeep chassis. It never went into production, but Willys liked the idea and gave Brook Stevens notable design jobs, including the 1946 Willys Jeep Station Wagon, 1947 Willys Jeep Truck, and 1948 Willys-Overland Jeepster, as well as the 1963–1993 Jeep Wagoneer.

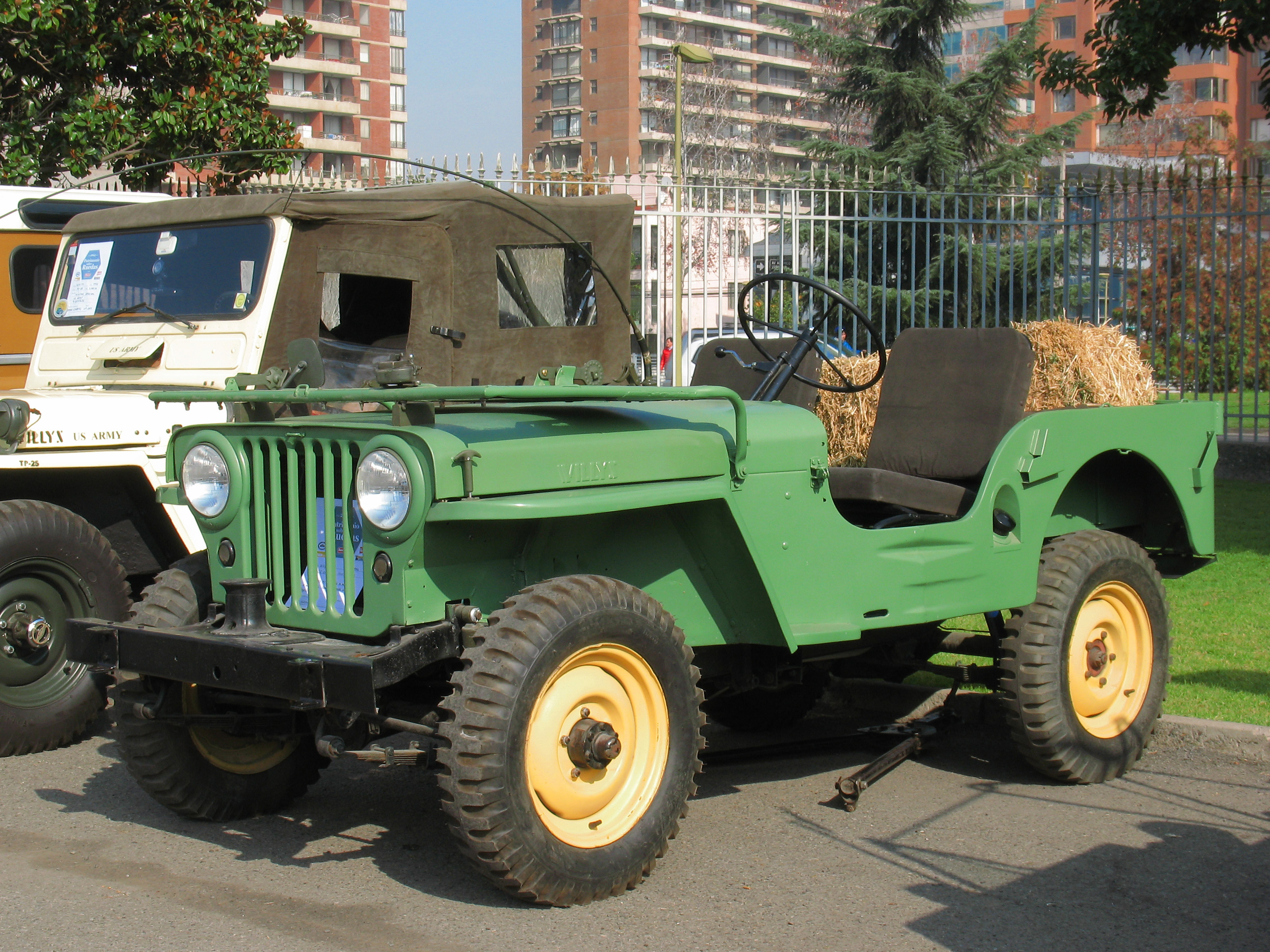
1946 Willys Jeep CJ-2A

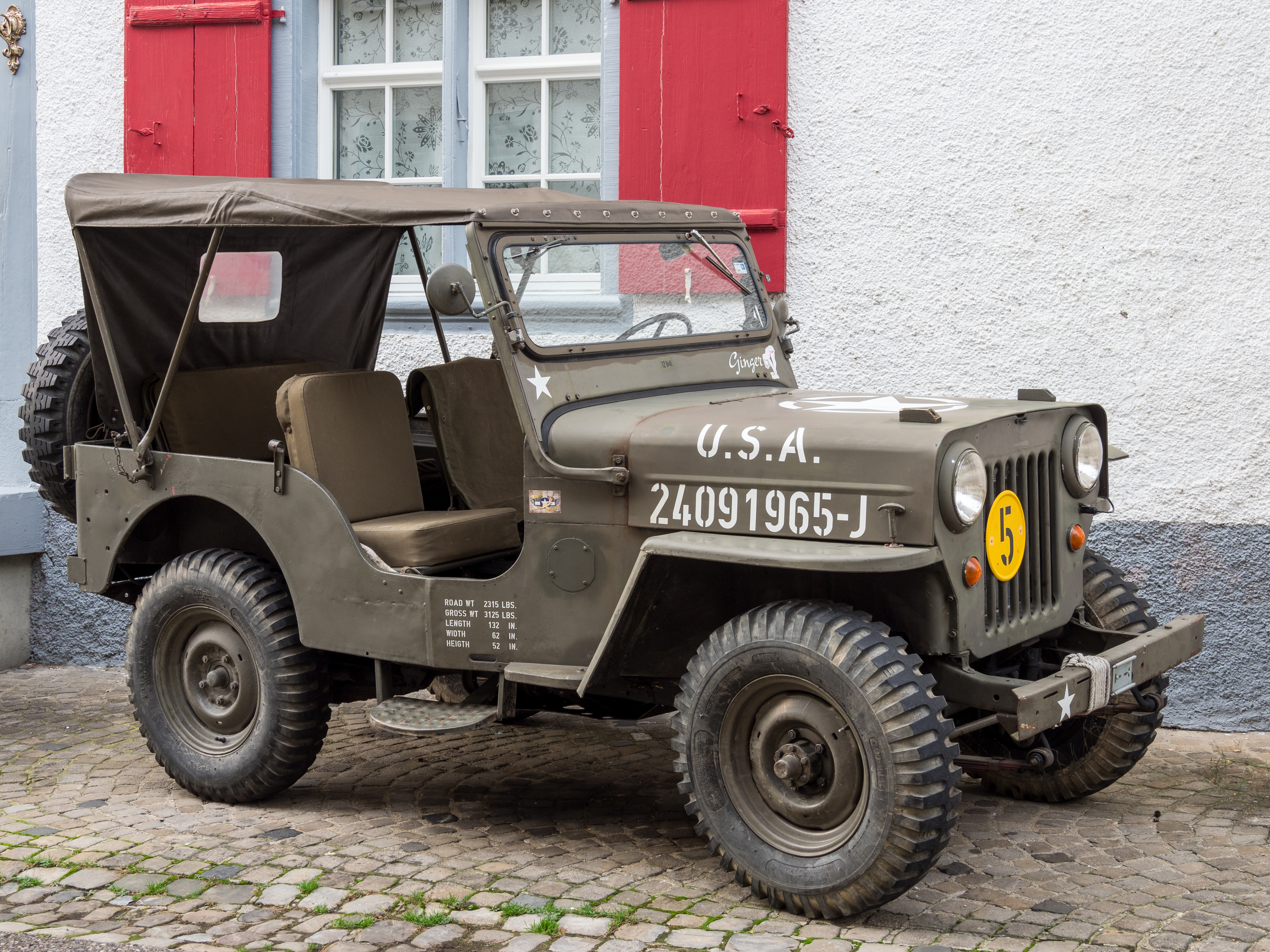
U.S.-marked M606 jeep

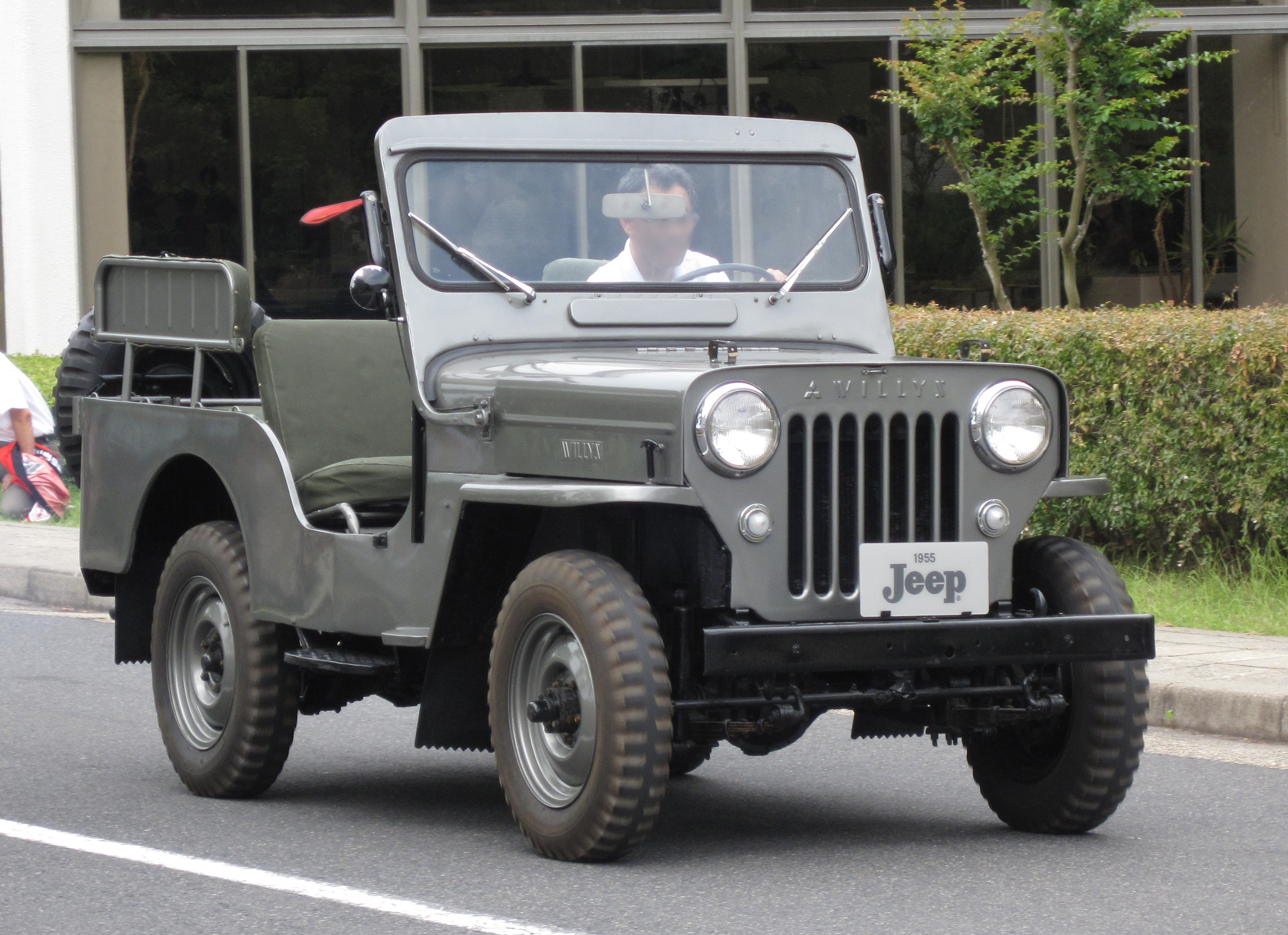
The Mitsubishi Jeep started as a license-produced CJ-3B

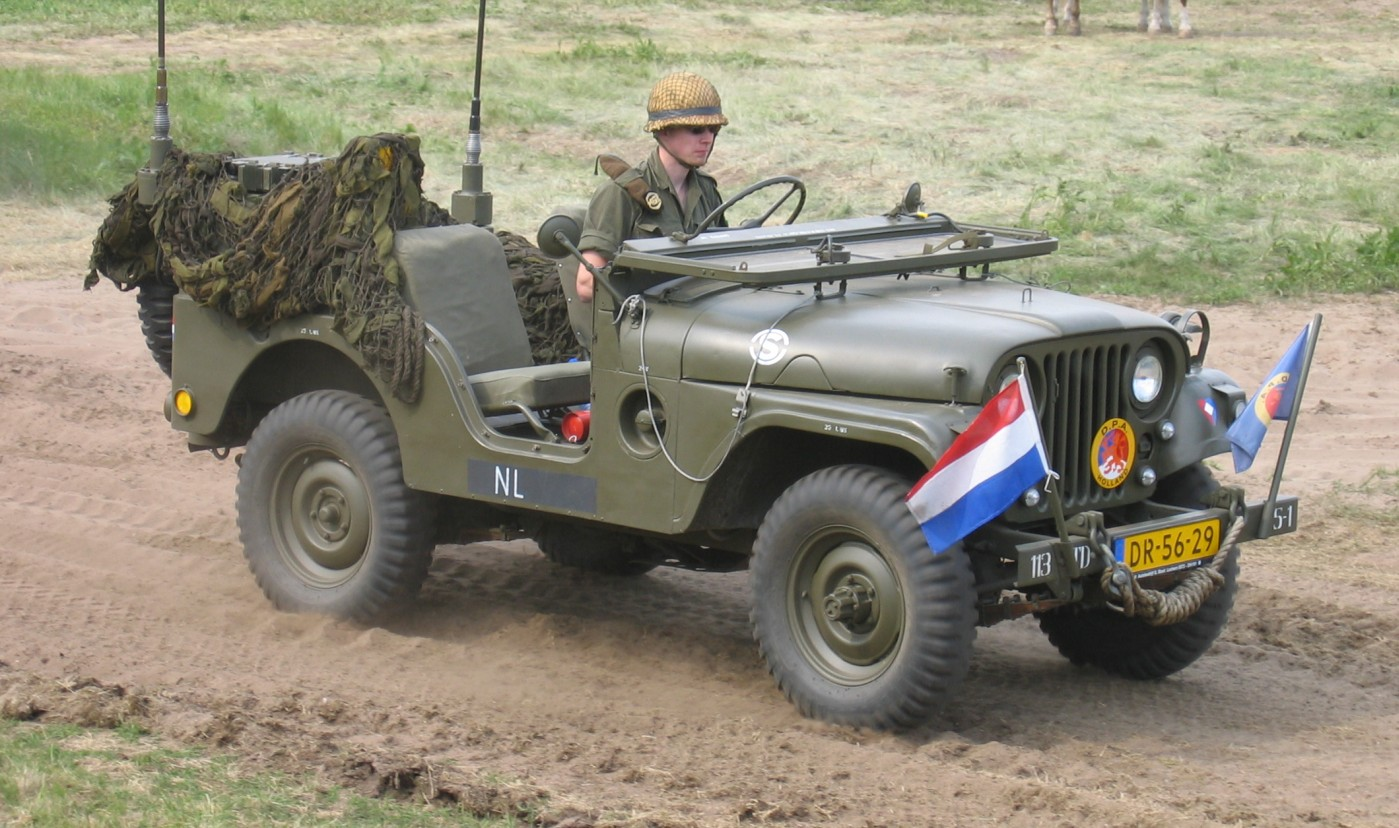
The NEKAF M38A1 jeeps served the Dutch Army for more than 40 years

In 1948, the U.S. Federal Trade Commission agreed with American Bantam that the idea of creating the Jeep was originated and developed by American Bantam in collaboration with the U.S. Army as well as Ford and Spicer. The commission forbade Willys from claiming, directly or by implication, that it had created or designed the jeep, and allowed it only to claim that it contributed to the development of the vehicle. The trademark lawsuit initiated and won by Bantam was a hollow victory: American Bantam went bankrupt by 1950, and Willys was granted the "Jeep" trademark the same year.

The first CJs were essentially the same as the MB, except for such alterations as vacuum-powered windshield wipers, a tailgate (and therefore a side-mounted spare tire), and civilian lighting. Also, the civilian jeeps had amenities like naugahyde seats and chrome trim, and they were available in a variety of colors. Mechanically, a heftier T-90 transmission replaced the Willys MB's T84 to appeal to the originally considered rural buyer demographic.

In Britain, Rover was inspired to build its own jeep-like vehicle. Their first testing prototype was actually built on the chassis of a war-surplus jeep, on the Welsh farm of then Rover chief engineer Maurice Wilks and by his older brother, managing director Spencer Wilks. Production of their "Land Rover" started after its presentation model was well received at the first post-war Amsterdam International Auto show or "AutoRAI" in 1948.

Willys-Overland and its successors, Willys Motors and Kaiser Jeep, continued to supply the U.S. military, as well as many allied nations, with military jeeps through the late 1960s. In 1950, the first post-war military jeep, the M38 (or MC), was launched, based on the 1949 CJ‑3A. In 1953, it was quickly followed by the M38A1 (or MD), featuring an all-new "round-fendered" body to clear the also new, taller, Willys Hurricane engine. This jeep was later developed into the civilian CJ-5 launched in 1955. Similarly, its ambulance version, the M170 (or MDA), featuring a 20-inch wheelbase stretch, was later turned into the civilian CJ-6.

Before the CJ-5, Willys offered the public a cheaper alternative with the taller F-head, overhead-valve engine, in the form of the 1953 CJ-3B, simply using a CJ-3A body with a taller hood. This was quickly turned into the M606 jeep (used primarily for export, through 1968) by equipping it with the available heavy-duty options such as larger tires and springs, and by adding blackout lighting, olive drab paint, and a trailer hitch. After 1968, M606A2, and -A3 versions of the CJ-5 were created in a similar way for friendly foreign governments. (Note: In the early 1980s, the Canadian Army took delivery of 195 militarized units of the CJ-7. These were put into service as a stopgap measure between the retirement of the M38A1 and the introduction of the Volkswagen Iltis. They were codified by the Canadian Forces with the Equipment Configuration Code (ECC) Number 121526.)

In 1976, after more than two decades, Jeep complemented the CJ-5 with a new CJ model, the CJ-7. Though still a direct evolution of the round-fendered CJ‑5, it had a 10 in (25 cm) longer wheelbase. And, for the first time, a CJ had doors and an available hardtop. Since then, new evolutions were derived from the CJ-7 – from 1987 onwards as Jeep "Wranglers". Nevertheless, these are considered direct descendants of the WWII jeep. The 2018 Wranglers still have a separate, open-topped body and ladder-frame, solid live axles front and rear, with part-time four-wheel drive, and high and low gearing. The compact body retains the Jeep grille and profile and can still be driven with the doors off and the windshield folded forward.

Licenses to produce jeeps, especially for CJ-3Bs, were issued to manufacturers in many countries, starting almost straight after WWII, with the Willys MB pattern. Some firms, like Mahindra and Mahindra Limited in India, continue to produce them in some form or another to this day. Chinkara Motors of India makes the Jeepster, with FRP body. The Jeepster can be delivered with a diesel engine or the 1.8L Isuzu petrol.

In France, the army used Hotchkiss M201 jeeps – essentially licensed Willys MBs, and in the former Yugoslavia, the arms manufacturer Zastava rebooted their car building branch, making 162 Willys jeeps. In Japan, Mitsubishi's first jeeps were versions of the CJ-3B, and in 1950 Toyota Motors was given an order by U.S. forces to build a vehicle to Jeep specifications, resulting in Toyota's BJ and FJ series of utility vehicles, slightly bigger and more powerful jeep-type vehicles. After the CJ-3B, several countries also built the Willys MD / M38A1 under license. For instance, the Dutch built some 8,000 "NEKAF" jeeps, which remained in service for some 40 years. In Israel, AIL continues building military derivatives of Jeep Wrangler models for the Israeli Security Forces, which has been ongoing since 1991. Their current AIL Storm III models are based on Africa Automotive Distribution Services (AADS) of Gibraltar's Jeep J8 model.

The compact military jeep continued to be used in the Korean and Vietnam Wars. In Korea, it was mainly deployed in the form of the MB, as well as the M38 and M38A1 (introduced in 1952 and 1953), its direct descendants. In Vietnam, the most used jeep was the then newly designed Ford M151, which featured such state-of-the-art technologies as a unibody construction and all-around independent suspension with coil springs. The M151 jeep remained in U.S. military service into the 1990s, and many other countries still use small, jeep-like vehicles in their militaries.

Apart from the mainstream of—by today's standards—relatively small jeeps, an even smaller vehicle was developed for the U.S. Marine Corps, suitable for helicopter airlifting and manhandling, the M422 "Mighty Mite".

Eventually, the U.S. military decided on a fundamentally different concept, choosing a much larger vehicle that not only took over the role of the jeep, but also replaced all its other light-wheeled vehicles: the HMMWV ("Humvee"). (Note: The HMMWV was generally very successful, but a few U.S. military units kept a small number of M151s in reserve for applications where the Humvee was too large or too heavy)

In 1991, the American Society of Mechanical Engineers designated the Willys-Overland Jeep MB an International Historic Mechanical Engineering Landmark.

== Postwar conversions ==
=== Filipino jeepney ===
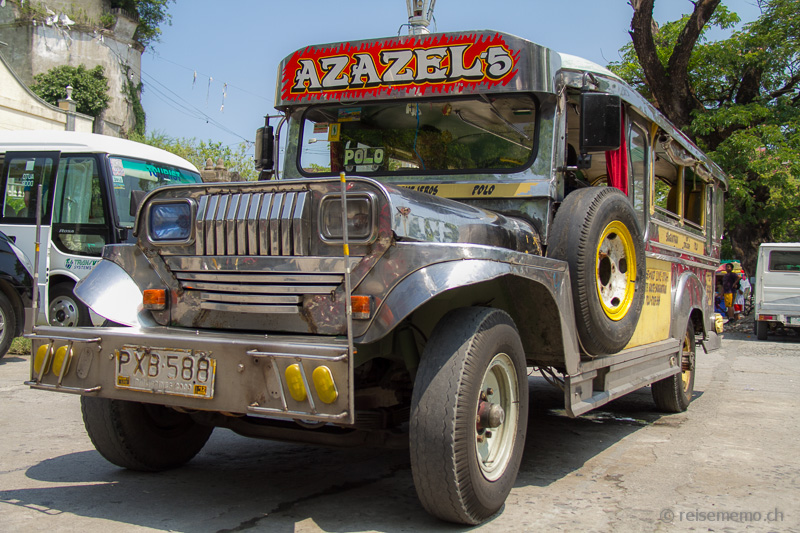
Jeepney

When American troops began to leave the Philippines at the end of World War II, hundreds of surplus jeeps were sold or given to local Filipinos. The Filipinos stripped down the jeeps to accommodate several passengers, added metal roofs for shade, and decorated the vehicles with vibrant colors and bright chrome hood ornaments.

The jeepney rapidly emerged as a popular and creative way to re-establish inexpensive public transportation, which had been virtually destroyed during World War II.

=== Argentine Autoar ===
Starting in 1950, a Jeep-engined utility vehicle was produced by Autoar in Argentina. In 1951, a new sedan was introduced using the same 2199 cc Jeep engine and manual transmission. It was fitted with an overdrive to compensate for the Jeep's low axle ratio. In 1952, a new overhead valve 3-litre six-cylinder was announced but was probably never built. At that time, Piero Dusio returned to Italy. In the 1950s, production was sporadic, and models built included a station wagon with a Jeep-type 1901 cc engine.

=== Commemorative edition ===
Inspired by the U.S. Army Willys MB, Jeep produced about 1000 Willys editions of the 2004 Wrangler TJ and hoped to sell twice that number for the 2005 model year.

== Production numbers ==
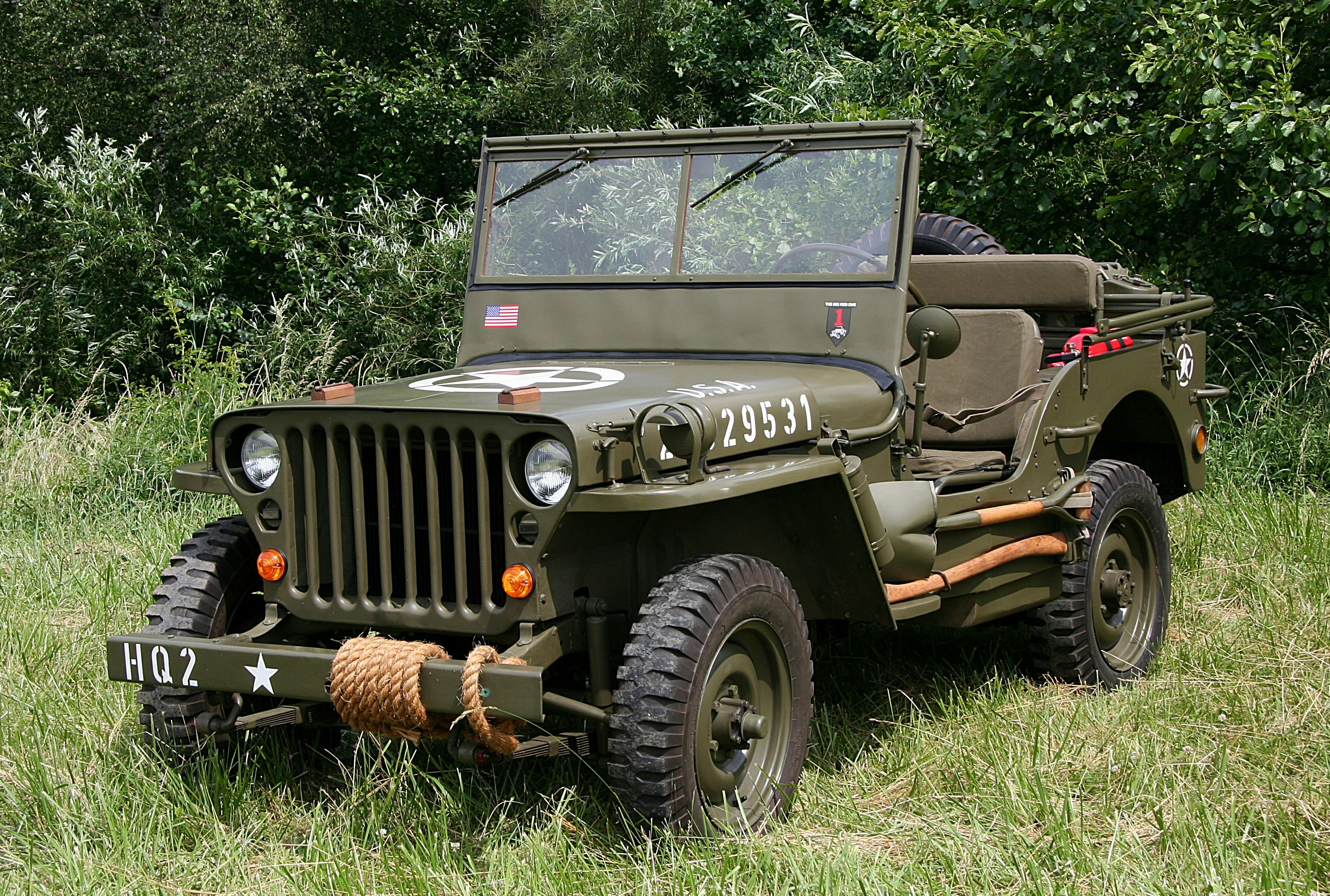
Once the jeep's design had converged, and was standardized, Ford and Willys built some 640,000 jeeps virtually identical to this 1944 MB.

Model	Year	Number built
American Bantam Pilot	1940	1
American Bantam Mk II / BRC-60	1940	70
Ford Pygmy	1940	1
Ford Budd	1940	1
Willys-Overland Quad	1940	2
American Bantam BRC-40	1941	2,605
Ford GP	1941	4,456
Willys-Overland MA	1941	1,553
Willys-Overland MB	1941–1945	361,339 (Note: 335,531 + 25,808 "slats")
Ford GPW	1942–1945	277,896
World War II Total	1940–1945	647,925
Other		
Ford GPA "Seep"	1942–1943	12,778
Post-war		
Willys M38 (MC)	1950–1952	61,423
Willys M38A1 (MD)	1952–1957	101,488
Willys M606 (CJ-3B)	1953–1968	? (Note: Part of 155,494 CJ-3Bs produced)
Willys M170	1954–1964	6,500

== Gallery ==
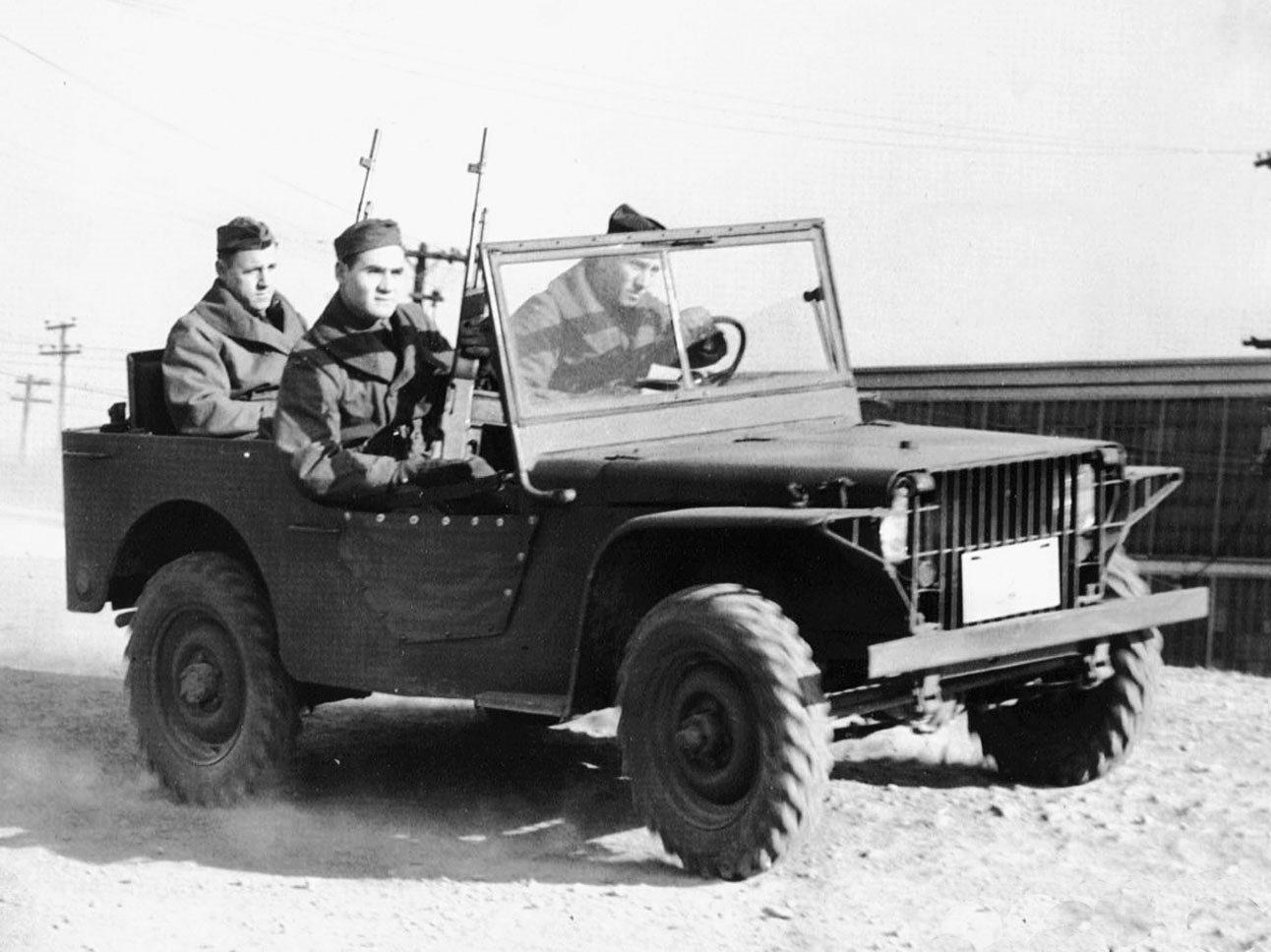
Ford pilot jeep "Pygmy" – note grille sides extend to support front fender edges

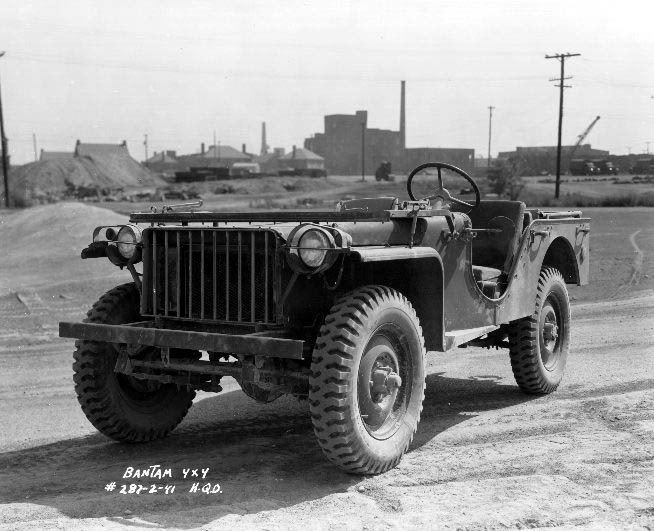
American Bantam early production model (BRC 40)

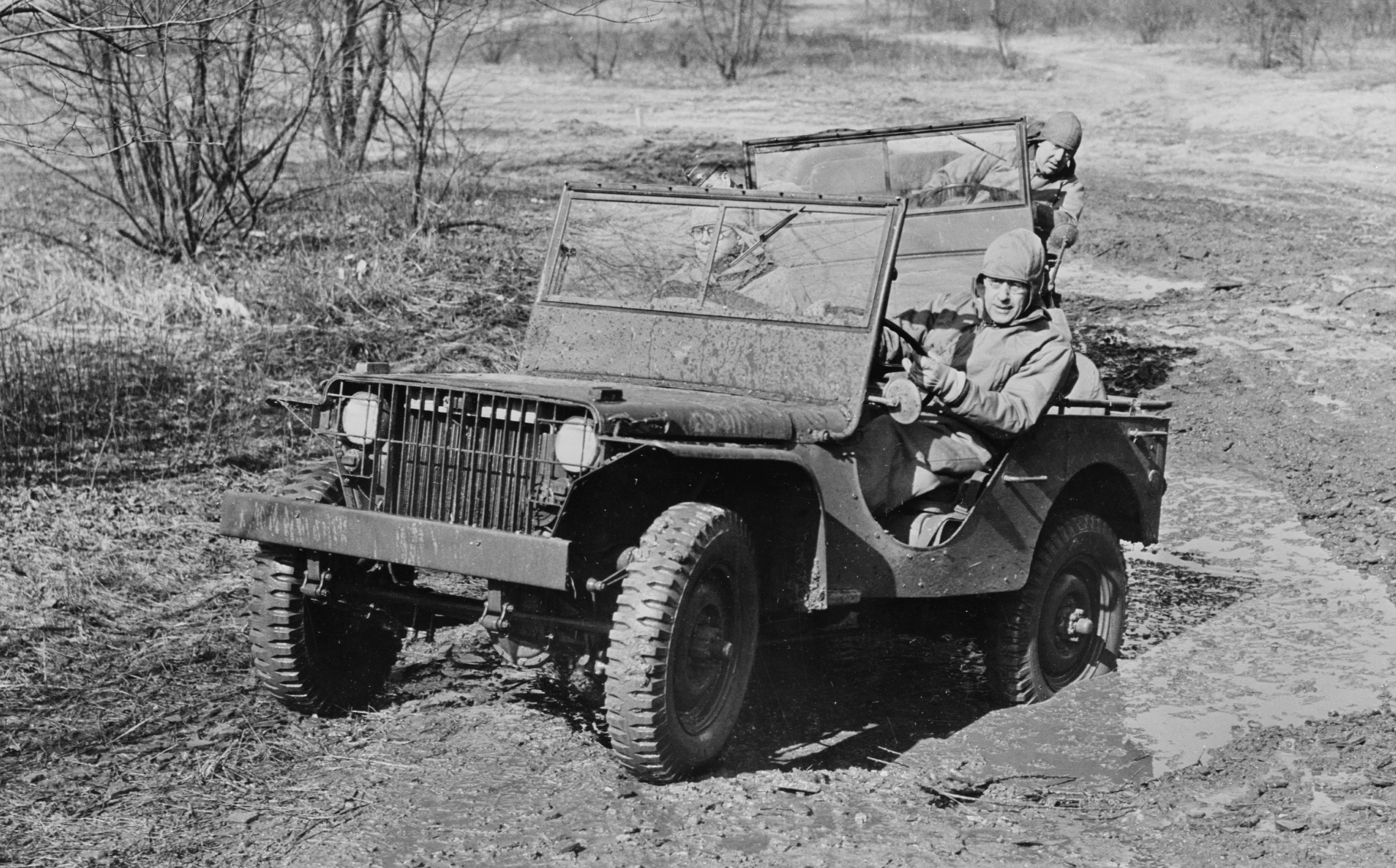
Ford GP early production model

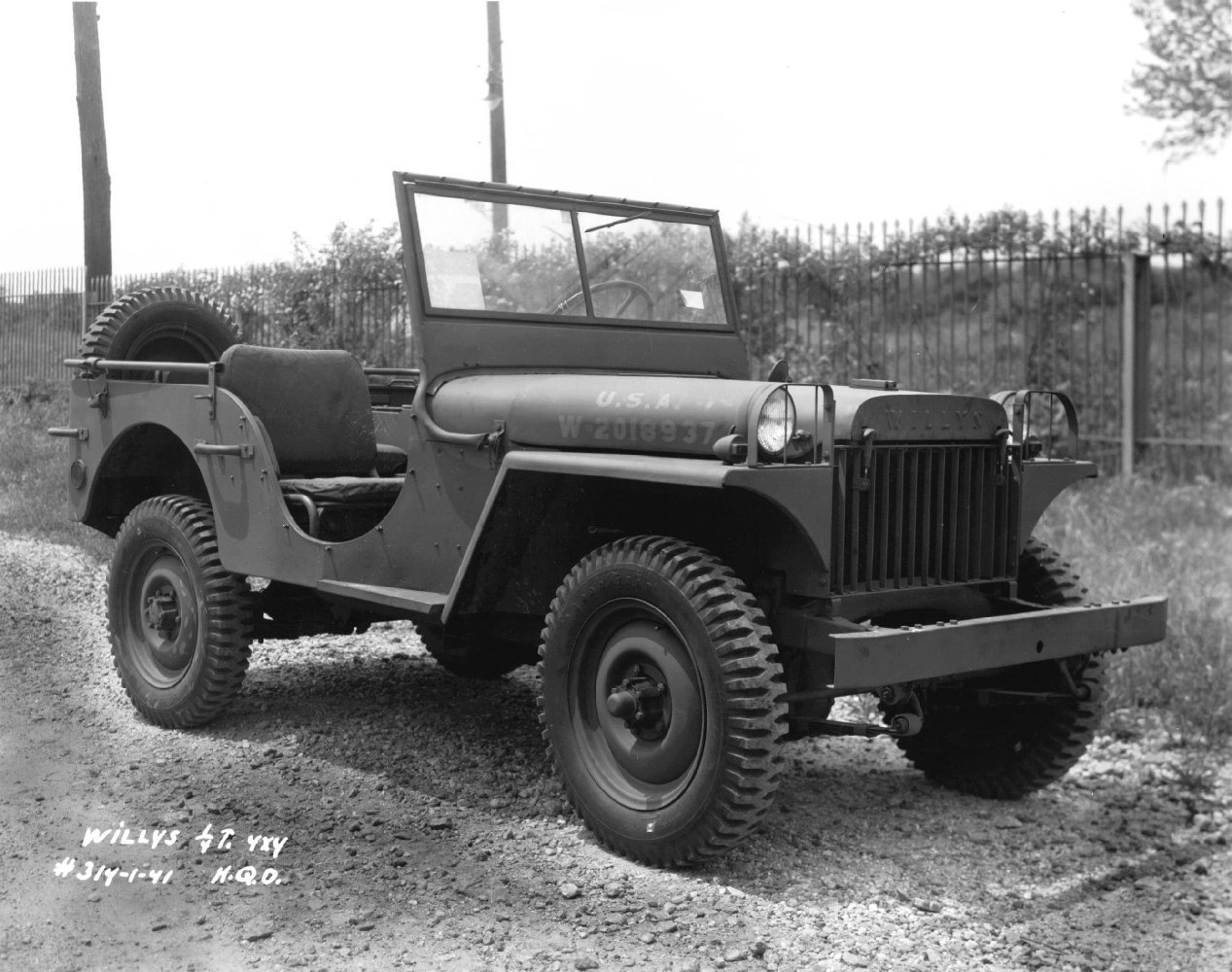
Willys MA early production model

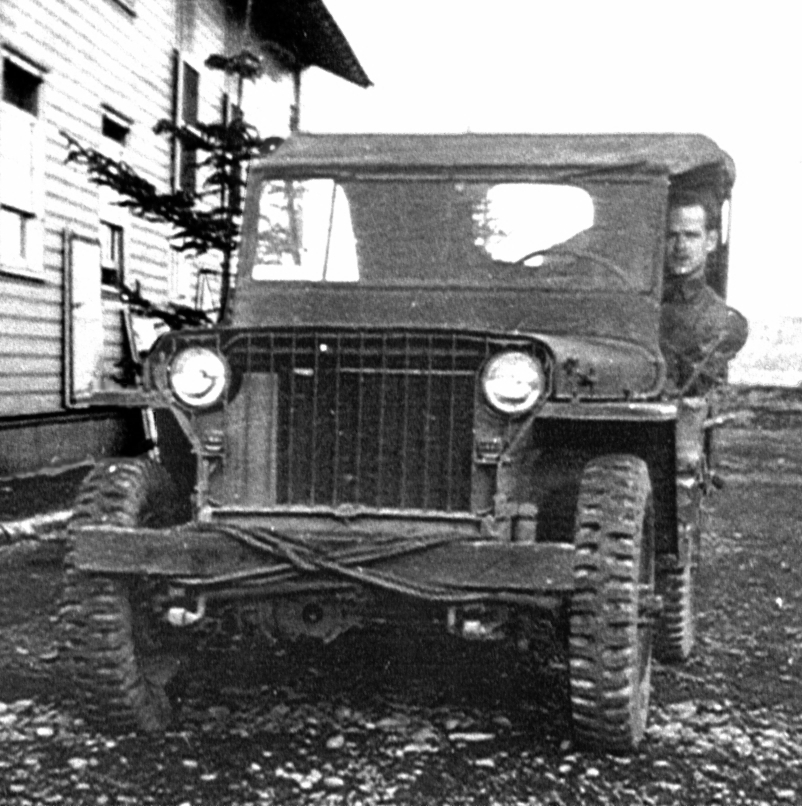
Early Willys MB ft. slat grille stationed in Alaska; period photo

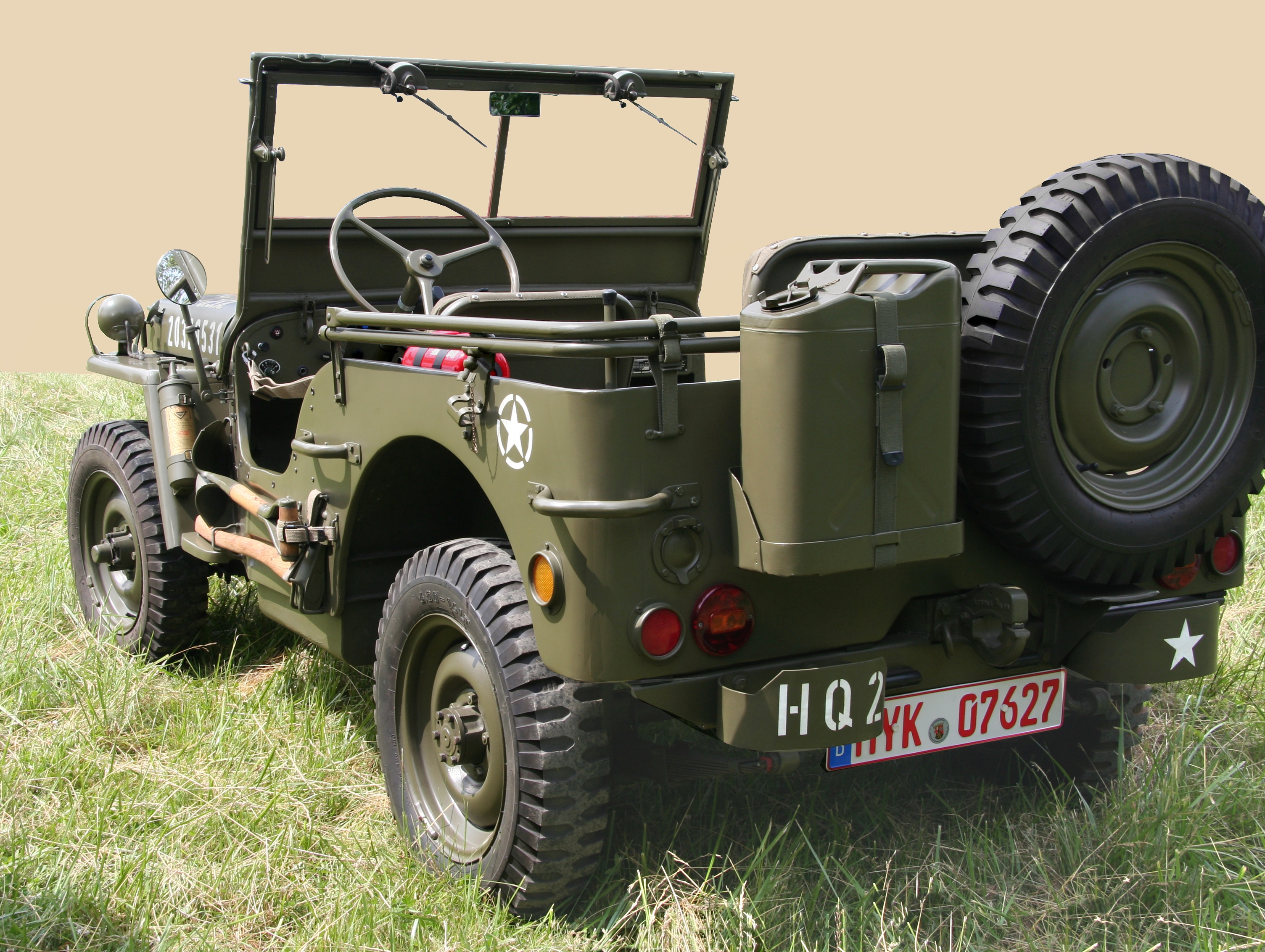
Willys MB left rear quarter: split combat rims, spare gas can, and spare wheel

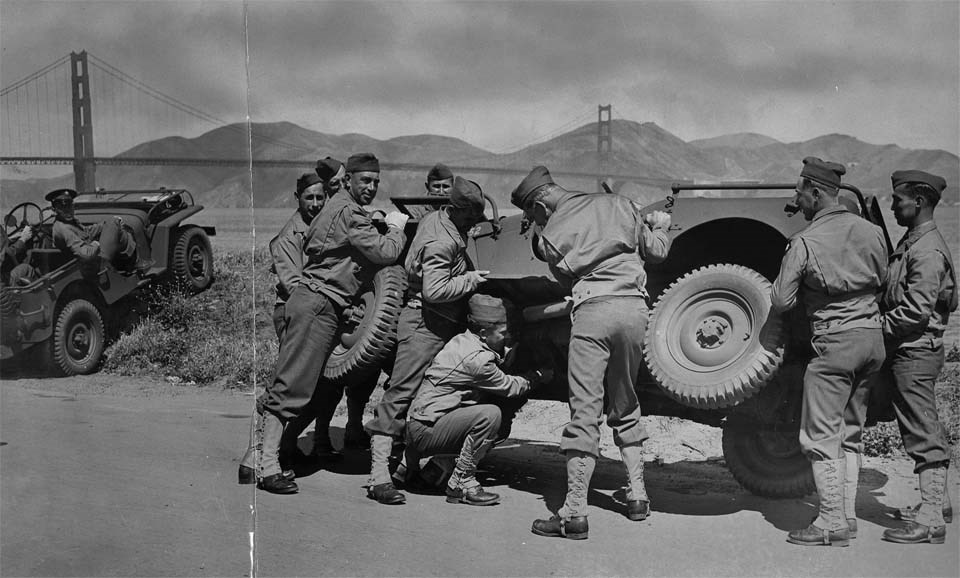
Soldiers maltreat the jeep as intended, to fix it. Golden Gate Park, San Francisco.

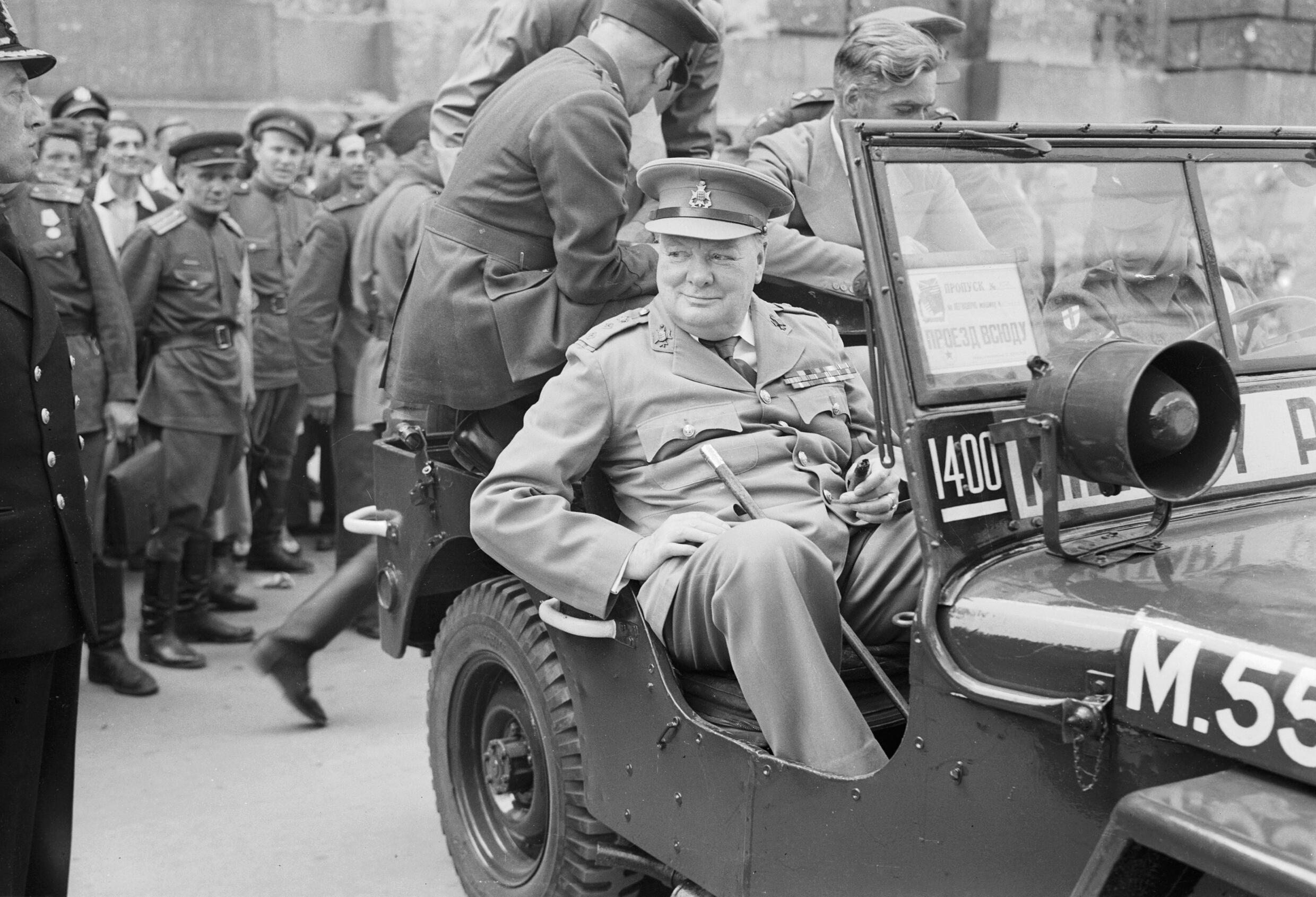
Winston Churchill in a jeep at the Reichstag building touring the ruins of Berlin, 16 July 1945

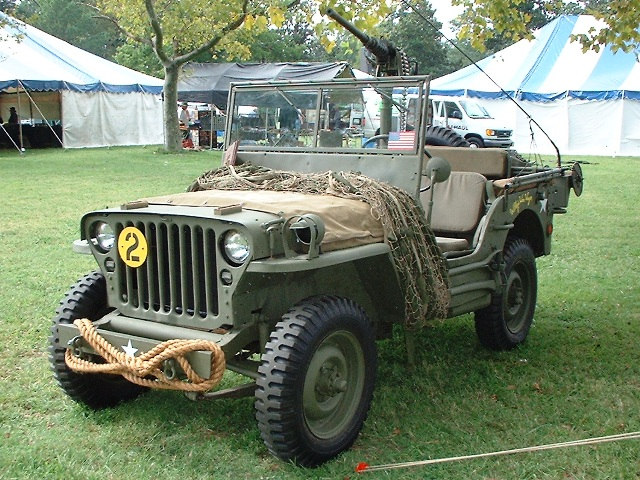
U.S. Army Willys MB at Virginia War Museum

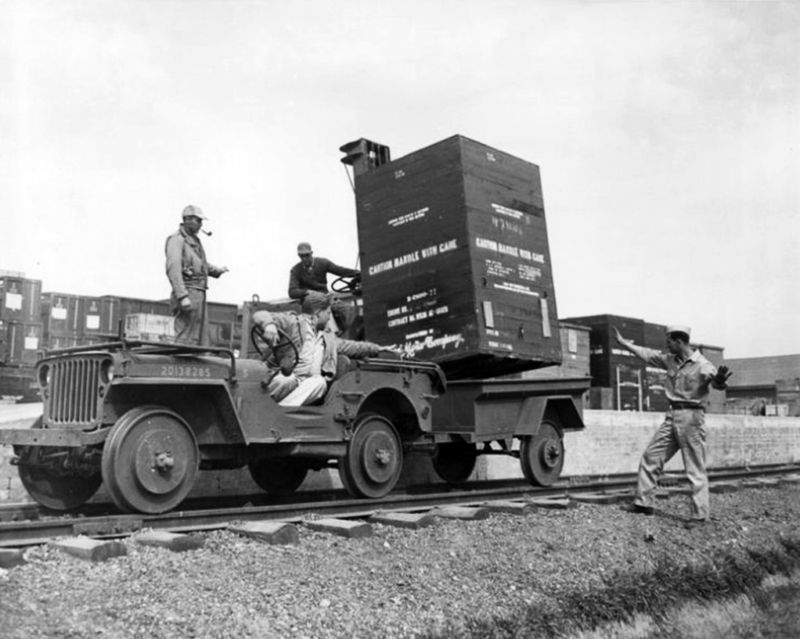
Rail Jeep conversion to a switch engine in Australia, 1943

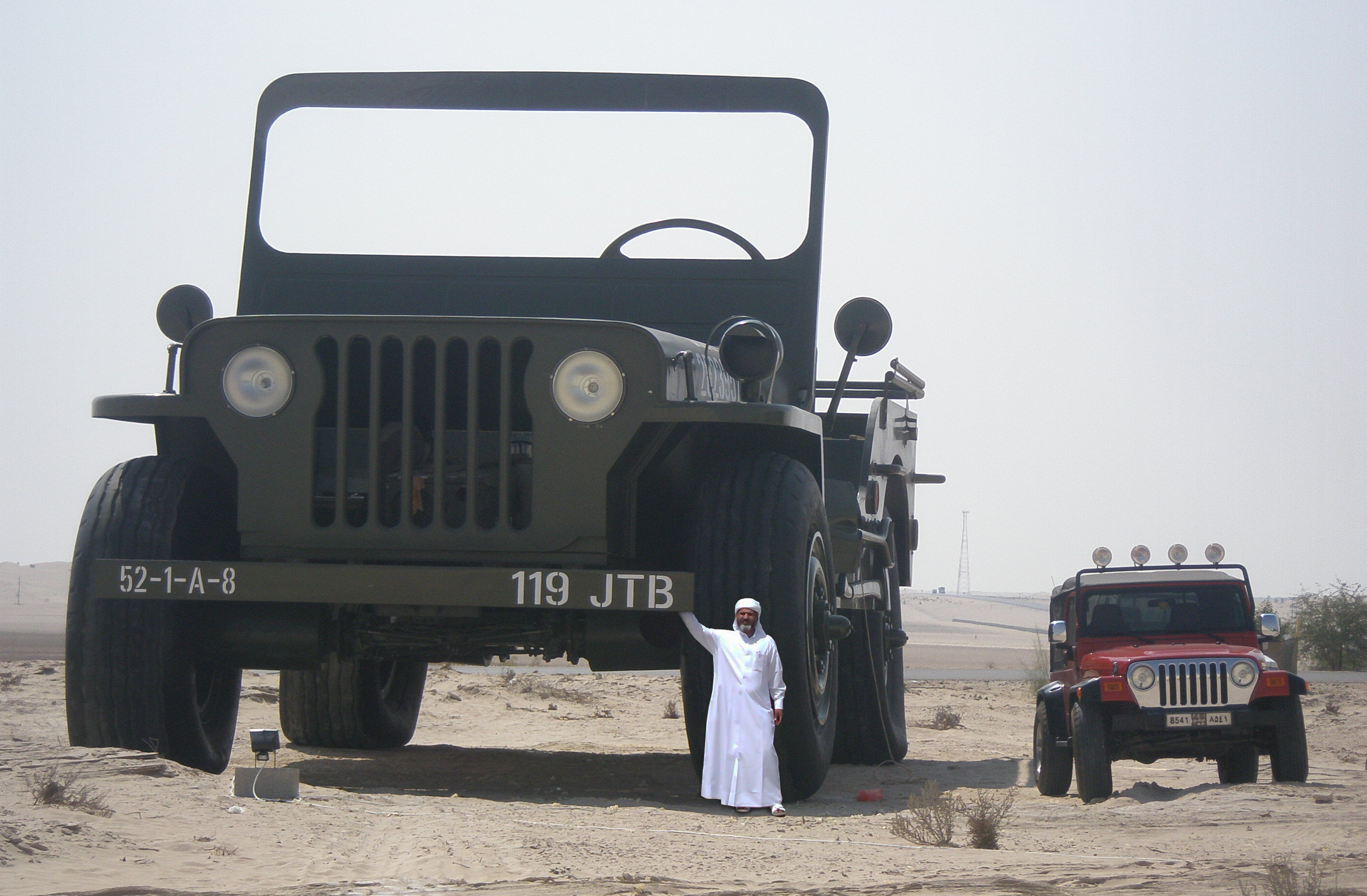
Sheikh Hamad bin Hamdan Al Nahyan with largest model Willys Jeep (scale 4/1)

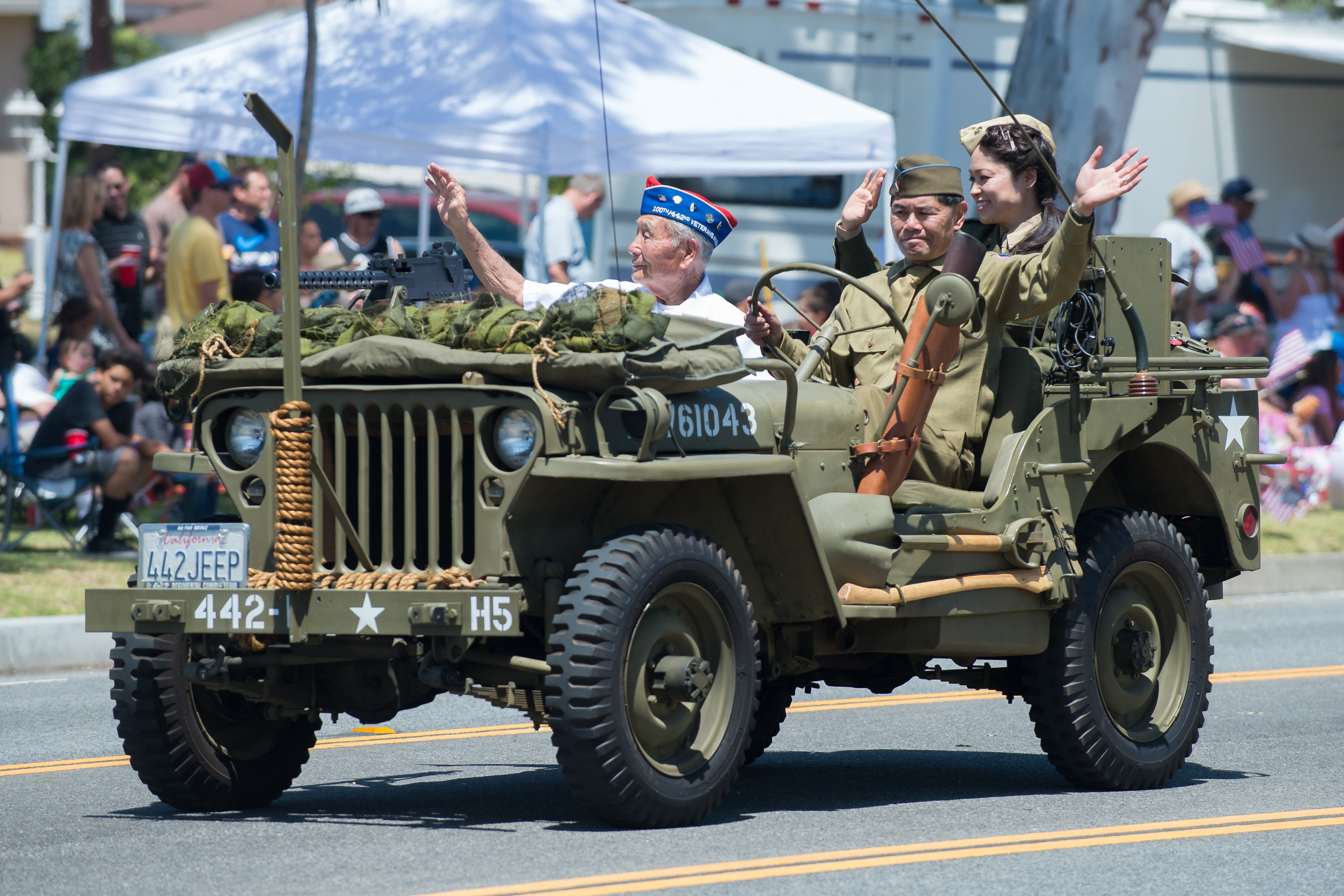
Japanese American WW II veterans in jeep in memorial parade

== Operators ==
- Australia
- Austria
- Cambodia
- Chile
- Free France
- India
- Israel
- Laos
- Netherlands
- Norway
- Philippines
- Poland
- Portugal: Designated as Transporte Geral ¼ ton. "Willis" MB 4×4 m/1944.
- South Korea
- Soviet Union: Designated as Виллис Модель "МБ" 1/4 тонн 4Х4.
- Thailand
- United Kingdom
- South Vietnam
- United States

== See also ==
- The Autobiography of a 'Jeep'
- List of U.S. military jeeps
- List of U.S. military vehicles by supply catalog designation

=== Similar vehicles ===
- Agrale Marruá – (Brazil)
- Austin Champ – (United Kingdom)
- Chivunk – (Brazil)
- CUCV – (United States)
- DKW Munga – (West Germany)
- Einheits-PKW der Wehrmacht – (Nazi Germany)
- Fath Safir – (Iran)
- FMC XR311 – (United States)
- Ford GTB – (United States) 'Burma jeep'
- Gaucho – (Argentina)
- GAZ-64 and GAZ-67 – (Soviet Union)
- Hafner Rotabuggy – (United Kingdom)
- Hotchkiss M201 – (France)
- HMMWV – (United States)
- Kaiser Jeep
- Jeep CJ
- Jeep trailer
- Jeep train
- Kurogane Type 95
- Land Rover Defender – (United Kingdom)
- Land Rover Perentie – (Australia)
- Land Rover (original series)
- Mercedes-Benz G-Class – (Germany)
- M151 Truck, Utility, l/4-Ton, 4×4 – (United States)
- Willys M38 – (United States)
- Willys M38A1
- M422 Mighty Mite – (United States)
- Mowag Eagle – (Switzerland)
- Mitsubishi Type 73 light truck – (Japan)
- Ñandú (vehicle) – (Argentina)
- Peugeot P4 – (France)
- Suzuki Jimny – (Japan)
- UAZ-469 – (Soviet Union)
- Universal Carrier – (United Kingdom)
- Volkswagen Iltis – (West Germany)
- Volkswagen Kübelwagen – (Nazi Germany)
- Volkswagen Schwimmwagen – (Nazi Germany)
- Willys FAMAE Corvo – (Chile)

== General references ==
- Ackerson, Robert C. (2006). Jeep CJ 1945–1986. Veloce Publishing. ISBN 9781904788966. Archived from the original on May 12, 2019.
- American Society of Mechanical Engineers (July 23, 1991), The Jeep MB, An International Historic Mechanical Engineering Landmark (PDF), Toledo, Ohio: Jeep House, code H152, archived from the original (PDF) on October 30, 2007
- Chief of Ordnance Office; Military Vehicle Preservation Association, eds. (2010). Summary Report of Acceptances, Tank-Automotive Materiel, 1940–1945 (Revision). Detroit: U.S. Army Service Forces, Office: Chief of Ordnance-Detroit, Production Division, Requirements and Progress Branch (published December 1945).
- Findlay, P. (writer, director) (2006). Man and Jeep (documentary). Barna-Alper Productions. Discovery Times.
- Hogan, E.P. (1941). "The Story of the Quarter-Ton, The Army's Smallest Car Known as a "Jeep" (PDF). The Quartermaster Review. Vol. XXI, no. 2. Washington D.C.: The Quartermaster Association. pp. 53–54, 82–84. Archived (PDF) from the original on September 7, 2023.
- Jeep: Steel Soldier (documentary). "Toledo Stories". PBS. September 27, 2007.
- Statham, Steve (1999). Jeep Color History. MBI Publishing. ISBN 978-0-7603-0636-9.
- Thomson, Harry C.; Mayo, Lida (2003) [1960]. The Ordnance Department: procurement and supply (PDF). United States Army in World War II; The Technical Services. Washington, D.C.: Center of Military History, U.S. Army. LCCN 74014697. Archived from the original (PDF) on May 19, 2017 – via U.S. Army Center of Military History. Publications Catalog
- TM 9–803 1/4‑ton 4x4 truck (Willys-Overland model MB and Ford model GPW) (PDF), War Department, February 22, 1944, archived from the original on September 25, 2023
- Zaloga, Steven J. (2011) [2005]. Jeeps 1941–45. New Vanguard 117. Bloomsbury Publishing (Osprey). ISBN 9781780961477.
