= Bantam BRC =

American off-road vehicle

Bantam BRC-40
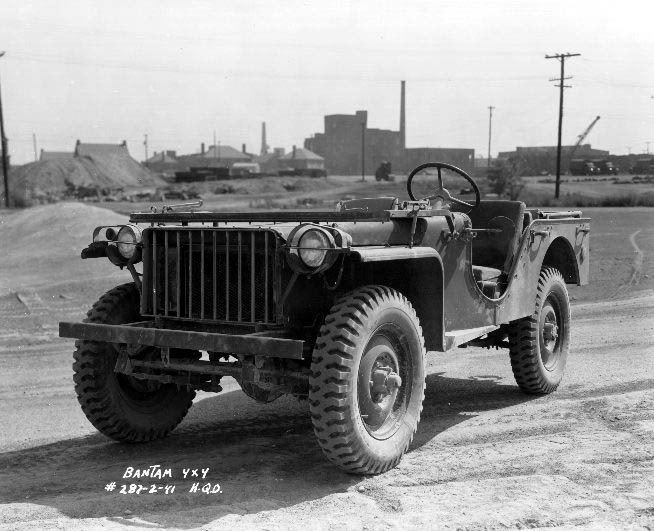

Overview
- Manufacturer: American Bantam
- Production: 1940–1943
- Assembly: Butler, Pennsylvania

Body and chassis
- Class: off-road vehicle
- Body style: open
- Related: Willys MB

Powertrain
- Engine: 112 cu in (1.8 L) Continental BY-4112 I4

Dimensions
- Wheelbase: 2,020 mm (80 in)
- Length: 3,240 mm (128 in)
- Width: 1,430 mm (56 in)
- Height: 1,780 mm (70 in) (with roof)
- Curb weight: 950 kg (2,090 lb)

Chronology
- Successor: Willys MB

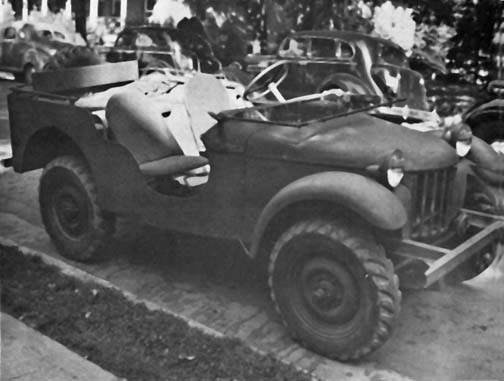
First prototype of Bantam

Bantam BRC is an American off-road vehicle designed during World War II, constructed in 1940, and the precursor to the Jeep. Produced in a relatively small number of 2,642 units, in several versions, it was used by the United States, the United Kingdom, and the Soviet Union. The basic version of the model was the BRC-40 (Bantam Reconnaissance Car 40).

== History of the project ==
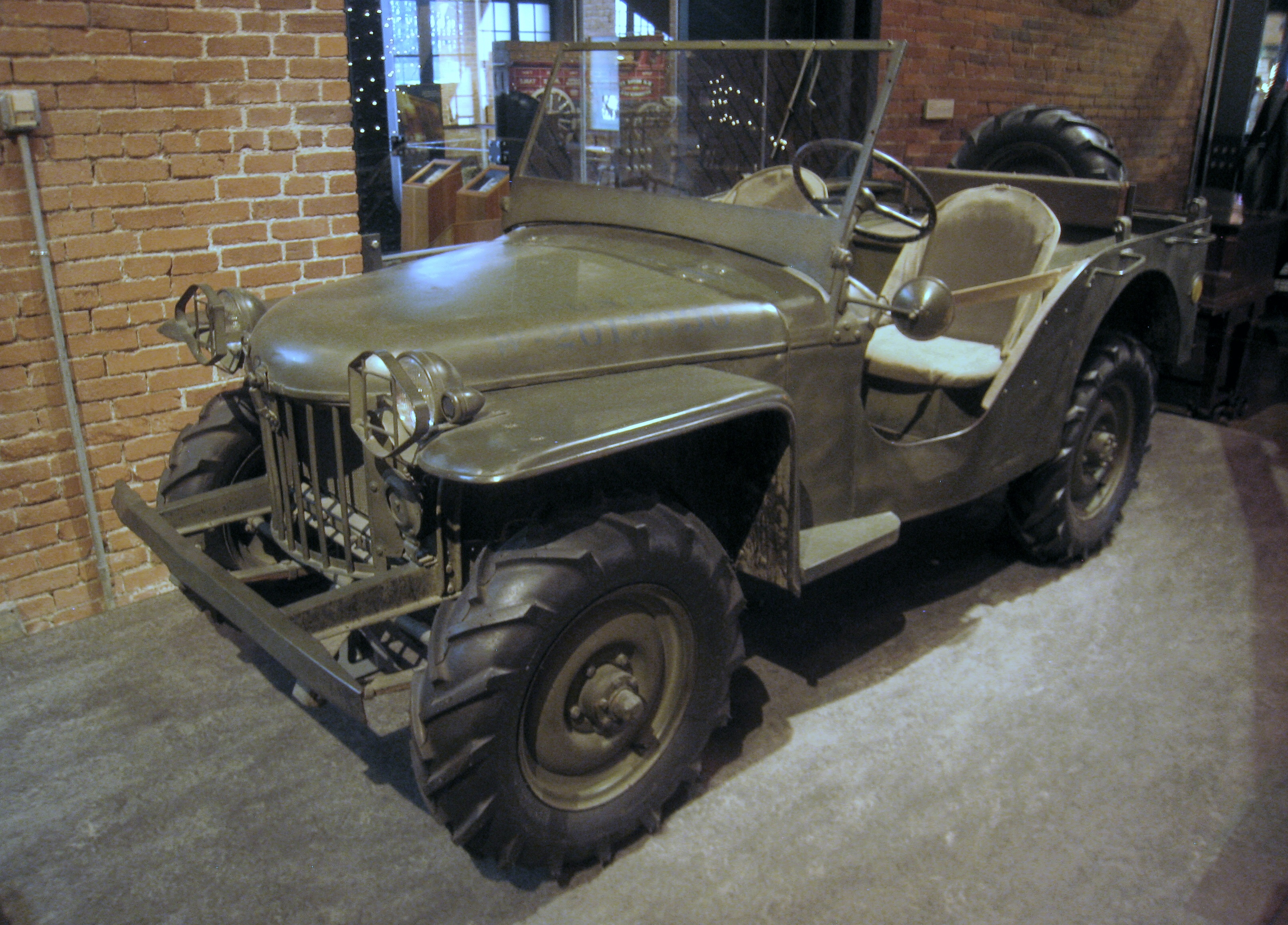
Bantam BRC-60

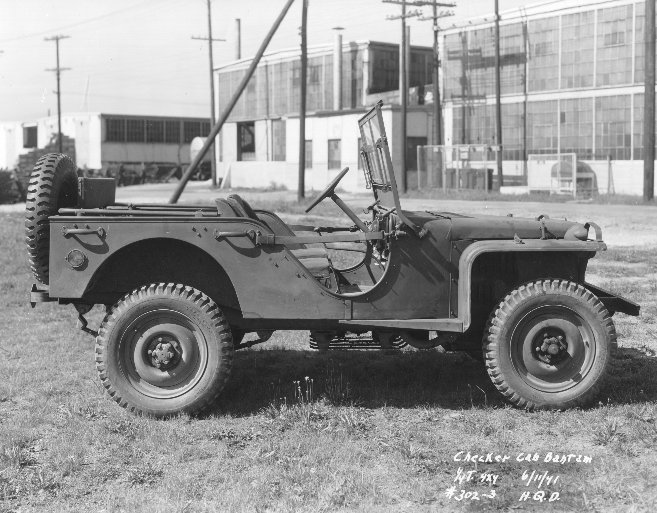
Bantam BRC-40

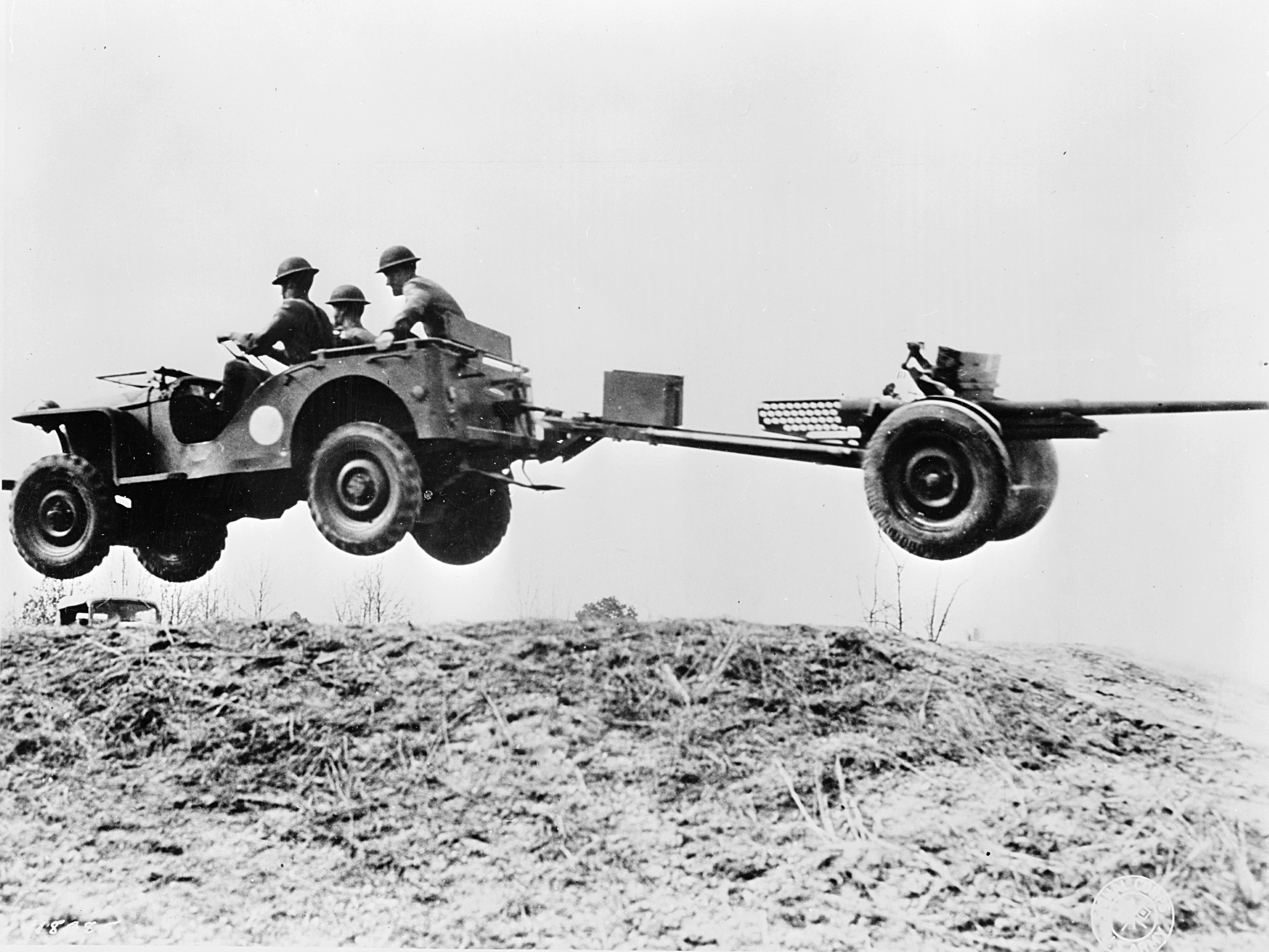
Bantam BRC-40 towing a 37 mm gun M3 captured "in motion"

In preparation for the United States' entry into World War II, the Department of War announced an invitation to tender in July 1940 for a light military vehicle intended for reconnaissance, liaison, and other purposes. It was to be classified as a quarter-ton, 4x4 truck. Earlier, on 27 May 1940, the Technical Armament Committee had approved the vehicle's specifications, which included all-wheel drive, a simple open body with a nearly rectangular outline, three seats (with a rear double seat), a wheelbase of 80 inches (2,032 mm), 47-inch (1,194 mm) axle track, and a maximum weight of 590 kg. The value of the tender was set at $175,000. Due to the stringent requirements and very short deadlines – 49 days to deliver the prototype and 75 days to build a series of 70 vehicles – only two out of 135 American car manufacturers expressed interest in participating: American Bantam and Willys-Overland.

American Bantam, based in Butler, Pennsylvania, was a small car manufacturer plagued by financial difficulties but saw an opportunity in the tender. Bantam received the specifications on July 17 and immediately engaged independent designer Karl Probst from Detroit as the lead designer for the vehicle. On his way to Butler, Probst ordered drive axles and a transfer case with a two-speed reduction drive from Spicer in Toledo. Probst arrived on 18 July 1940, and the preliminary design was ready the next day. The vehicle’s engine was a 4-cylinder Continental BY-4112 gasoline engine with a displacement of 1,835 cc and a power output of 48 hp. The axles were sourced from the Studebaker Champion, with Spicer joints. The designers, however, chose to disregard the weight limit, deeming it unattainable, and planned for a weight of 841 kg (the prototype eventually weighed 922 kg). Bantam submitted their offer on July 22, and on August 5, it won the tender, surpassing Willys by offering to complete the prototype in 49 days, compared to Willys’ 120 days.

Bantam completed the prototype on time, delivering it on September 23 on its own wheels to the testing center at Camp Holabird, 275 km away (by that time, the vehicle had traveled only 250 km). The grueling 30-day endurance tests, during which it covered 5,800 km, were successful, and any breakdowns, including frame cracks, were swiftly repaired (any malfunction lasting more than 24 hours would have led to disqualification). Military representatives were impressed by the vehicle's off-road capabilities. On October 27, Bantam was presented to the Armored Weapons Commission at Fort Knox. The first Bantam prototype was referred to as the "pilot model".

== Production ==
After the prototype, Bantam produced 70 pre-series vehicles, designated as Bantam Model 60 or Mk II, also known in literature as BRC-60. The main visual difference was the replacement of rounded stamped fenders from the Bantam passenger car with fenders made from right-angled sheet metal panels and wider entry cutouts on the sides. Like the prototype, these vehicles had a narrowing hood with a rounded grille but were additionally equipped with bar guards for the headlights, which were partially recessed into the fenders. At the army's request, eight vehicles were experimentally equipped with four-wheel steering.

Before delivering the pre-series vehicles, Bantam received an order from the U.S. Army to produce a series of 1,350 improved vehicles, followed by another 72, of which 22 were equipped with all-wheel steering. The production vehicles were designated as BRC-40 (1940, Bantam Reconnaissance Car). The appearance of these vehicles changed: the main difference was the flat, wider hood preferred by the army, with a flat radiator grille similar to the parallel Ford GP vehicles. The headlights remained mounted on the fenders, partially recessed. Apart from the headlight placement, the main visual distinction from Ford GPs and Willys vehicles was the rectangular front fenders with rounded corners. The fuel tank was relocated from the rear of the vehicle to under the driver’s seat, and the windshield became sturdier and split in two. The vehicle’s price was reduced from $1,123 for the first 500 units to $938.

In the U.S., vehicles of this class were generally not intended for combat, but the BRC could carry a .50 caliber M2 Browning heavy machine gun on a pillar mount installed between the front seats, similar to later standard jeeps.

With the selection of the Willys MB as the standard off-road vehicle, Bantam did not receive further orders from the U.S. Army for vehicles, but only for 10,000 trailers for jeeps. Only a limited number of vehicles were produced for foreign buyers – 1,001 BRC-40 vehicles were built for British orders in 1941, and another 150 in 1943 (originally ordered by Yugoslavia). In total, 2,642 vehicles were built, not counting the prototype. (Note: The commonly cited figure is 2,642 units (Ware (2010, p. 28); Crismon (1983, p. 212)), yet a summary of orders by Ware (2010, pp. 43–44) lists a total of 2,643 vehicles. It is possible that one assembled by Checker was included in this count.) One vehicle was assembled by the Checker Cab Company in Kalamazoo, known for its taxi production, though production was not ultimately launched there.

In addition to the U.S. and British armies, these vehicles were also used by the Soviet army through the Lend-Lease program, beginning with the Battle of Moscow in autumn 1941. Soviet Union received 531 BRC-40 vehicles, with 500 delivered by the end of 1942. According to other sources, a total of 808 vehicles were sent to the Soviet Union, about 530 of which were used by the Red Army, with the remainder employed by other services (e.g., adapted as fire engines). In the Soviet Union, the Bantam was colloquially known as the "bantik". A few vehicles also reached the Polish People's Army and Polish state institutions, either through the Soviet Union or later deliveries from the United Nations Relief and Rehabilitation Administration.

== Influence on other designs ==
The second company participating in the bid, Willys-Overland, did not yet have a vehicle design at the time and submitted its bid based on a cost and time analysis. Despite losing the bid, it began designing and building a prototype at its own risk. In pursuit of optimal vehicles, the American Quartermaster Corps (QMC) provided the plans of the Bantam prototype to Willys and Ford for use in their projects, allowing them to observe the prototype during testing (despite Bantam's objections, the Army argued that it had paid for the development and could show it to whomever it chose). Willys’ first prototype of an off-road vehicle, the Willys Quad, similar to and structurally related to the Bantam, was delivered on 11 November 1940. It used the same axles and transfer case from Spicer, but with a stronger in-house engine, the Willys prototype had better performance and ultimately became the basis for the Willys MA model ordered by the Army (1,500 units) and later the mass-produced standard jeep, the Willys MB. Notably, during World War II, in the mechanized cavalry of the United States, particularly in reconnaissance units, the informal term "bantam" was widely used to refer to Willys jeeps.

In October 1940, the U.S. Army also persuaded Ford to participate in developing an off-road vehicle. On 23 November 1940, Ford introduced its prototype, the Ford Pygmy, which also drew from Bantam’s design (it introduced innovations such as a wide, flat hood, later adapted with modifications for the Bantam BRC-40 and the standard Willys MB jeep). The Army ordered 1,500 Ford GP vehicles and later allocated large-scale production of the licensed Willys MB model, the GPW, to Ford.

The term "jeep" for an off-road vehicle became associated with Willys during the war, and the company used this in its marketing materials. Following a complaint by Bantam, however, the Federal Trade Commission in 1948 barred Willys from claiming it was the creator of the jeep, recognizing that the idea and development of the jeep originated at American Bantam in collaboration with certain U.S. Army officers. Despite this, Bantam soon went bankrupt, and in 1950, Willys, which continued to produce its off-road vehicles, subsequently registered Jeep as its trademark.

The Bantam's debut also inspired the development of Soviet off-road vehicles – in January 1941, authorities instructed designers at the GAZ factory to create their own vehicle modeled after the Bantam, as seen in the press. Contrary to some opinions, the resulting GAZ-64 design from March 1941 was not based on American vehicles (to which the Soviets had no access at the time), borrowing only the general design concept, body shape, and similar dimensions. Its improved successor was the better-known GAZ-67.

In 1941, the U.S. Army tested experimental tank destroyers based on the BRC-40 with a 37 mm gun M3 mounted. In the T2 model, the gun with a low protective shield fired forward within a 30° range on each side, while in the T2E1 model, the gun was mounted rotatably in the rear with a 360° field of fire, typically firing rearward. Seven T2 and eleven T2E1 units were built, but the chassis was found to be too light for the gun, which was later removed.

== Technical specifications ==
=== Dimensions and weights ===
- Body: steel, open, 4-seat, mounted on a rectangular frame
- Length: 128 in (3,240 mm)
- Width: 56 in (1,430 mm)
- Height: 70 in (1,780 mm) (with the roof deployed)
- Wheelbase: 80 in (2,020 mm)
- Front/Rear track width: 47.5 / 47.4 in (1,206 / 1,205 mm)
- Curb weight: 2,090 lb (950 kg)
- Ground clearance: 8.7 in (220 mm)

=== Powertrain ===
- Engine: Continental BY-4112 – carbureted, 4-stroke, straight-four, flathead, water-cooled, longitudinally mounted at the front
- Displacement: 1,835 cc (112.0 cu in)
- Cylinder bore x stroke: 3.2 in × 3.9 in (81 mm × 99 mm)
- Maximum power: 48 hp (36 kW) at 5,400 rpm
- Maximum torque: 80 lb⋅ft; 109 N⋅m (11.1 kgf⋅m)
- Compression ratio: 6.83:1
- Fuel supply: carburetor
- Transmission: 3-speed manual transmission, with a transfer case featuring a two-speed reduction drive for off-road use
- Drive: 4-wheel drive (front wheels engageable)

=== Suspension ===
- Front suspension: independent – solid axle, semi-elliptical leaf springs
- Rear suspension: independent – solid axle, semi-elliptical leaf springs
- Brakes: drum brakes
- Tires: 5.50x16 or 6.00x16

=== Performance data ===
- Maximum speed: 53 mph (86 km/h)
- Fuel consumption: approx. 12 L/100 km
- Fuel tank capacity: 10 US gal (38 L)
- Range on road: 196 mi (315 km)
- Minimum turning radius: 17.9 ft (5.45 m)

Main source:

== Bibliography ==
- Ware, Pat (2010). Military Jeep: 1940 onwards (Willys MB, Ford GPW, and Hotchkiss M201): enthusiasts' manual. Sparkford: Haynes Publishing. ISBN 978-1-84425-933-5.
- Crismon, Fred (1983). U.S. Military Wheeled Vehicles. Motorbooks International.
