= Howie machine gun carrier =

Howie(-Wiley) Machine Gun Carrier
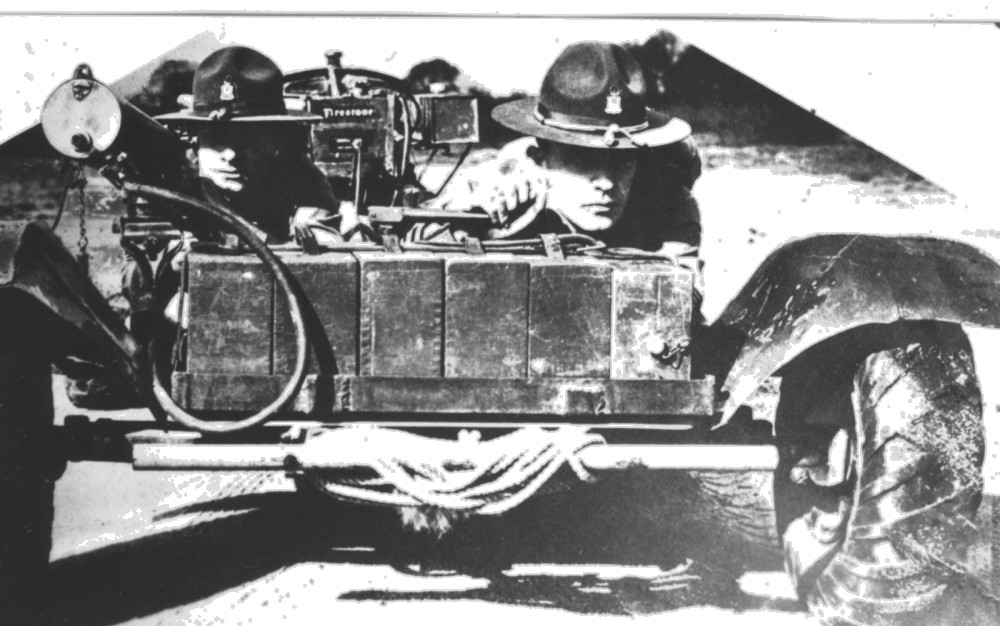
- Nicknamed the "belly-flopper", crewed by two soldiers lying prone, and ready to fire; front view

Overview
- Manufacturer: United States Army Infantry School, Fort Benning, Georgia
- Assembly: Robert G. Howie, Melvin C. Wiley, and G.L. Rush
- Designer: Walter C. Short, Robert G. Howie

Body and chassis
- Class: Military scout car / light Gun Motor Carriage (GMC)
- Body style: Open, platform
- Layout: Rear-engine, rear-wheel-drive layout
- Platform: Austin American engine and drive-train components

Powertrain
- Transmission: mid-mounted differential and jack-shaft(s), with motorcycle chain-drive to each rear wheel.

Dimensions
- Wheelbase: 75 in (1.91 m)
- Length: 124 in (3.15 m)
- Width: 61.75 in (1.57 m)
- Height: 33.25 in (84 cm)
- Curb weight: 1,015 lb (460 kg) (not including machine gun and equipment)

The Howie machine gun carrier was a 1937 light U.S. Army scout and machine-gun vehicle prototype, created to prepare for World War II.

The Howie (also called the Howie-Wiley and nicknamed the "belly flopper") never entered production. A single prototype was made of this early effort at military motorization, an initiative that contributed to the development of the highly successful World War II jeep.

The vehicle was ordered by General Walter C. Short, then Assistant Commandant of The Infantry School, U.S. Army at Fort Benning, Georgia; and built by Captain Robert G. Howie and Master Sergeant Melvin C. Wiley. It was completed in April 1937. Because the two-man crew lay prone, the vehicle was nicknamed the "belly flopper". The crew consisted of a driver and a gunner operating the .30 caliber machine gun.

The vehicle used a rear-engine, rear-wheel-drive layout, (Note: Johnson (1937). The Howie Machine-Gun Carrier, p. 530) that has been mistaken for rear-engine, front-wheel drive, which would make it exceptionally rare. Howie and Wiley used an American Austin car as a basis for the vehicle, and obtained some needed parts from salvage. A tiller was used for steering.

The vehicle presented a low profile—which could be useful in reconnaissance work and combat—but it lacked four-wheel drive, and the low ground-clearance rendered it unsuitable for rough terrain. The Army invited representatives of automobile manufacturers to examine the Howie in 1940, but the reception was not favorable and the vehicle was not accepted for production. Barney Roos, chief engineer of Willys Overland, examined it and later said "That belly flopper looked like nothing any automobile man had ever seen before, a cross between a kid's scooter and a diving board on wheels".

The Howie is still in existence, at Fort Benning.

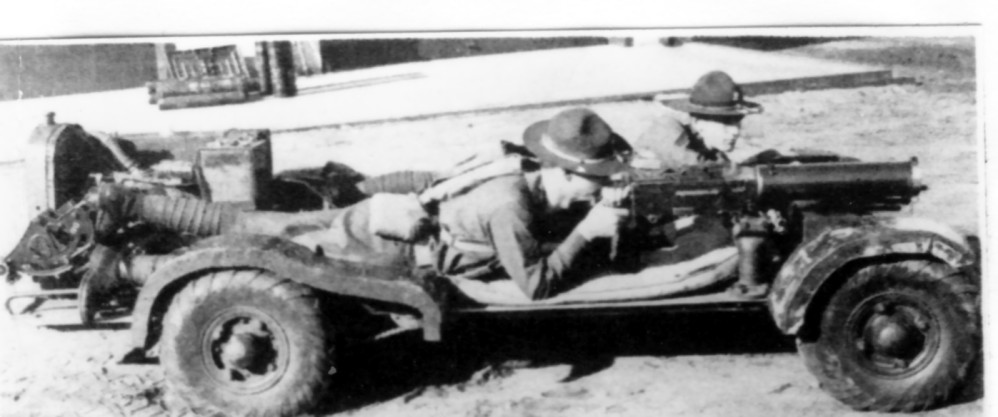
Right side view of Howie, crew in position for riding and action, possibly during testing
