= Ford jeep =

Ford jeep may refer to:

- Ford GPW, the World War II U.S. four-wheel drive military utility vehicle, manufactured by Ford, using the "Willys" licensed design, from 1941 to 1945
- Ford Pygmy, Ford's first prototype for the U.S. Army's requirement for the World War II light reconnaissance vehicle
- Ford M151, Ford's successor to the U.S. military Willys jeeps, produced from 1959, and used through the 1990s
- Ford Bronco, Ford's SUV line, launched to compete with the Jeep CJ; produced from 1966 to 1996, over five generations
