= American Bantam =

Automobile company (1935–1956)

- Industry: Automobile, Military Industry
- Founded: August 1935
- Founder: Roy Evans
- Defunct: 1956
- Fate: Acquired
- Headquarters: Butler, Pennsylvania
- Key people: William A. Ward Jr.; Charles 'Harry' Payne; Harold Crist; Frank Fenn; Ralph Turner; Chet Hempfling; Karl Probst
- Products: Vehicles, Jeeps
- Number of employees: 916

The American Bantam Car Company was an American automobile manufacturing company incorporated in the state of Pennsylvania. American Bantam is credited with inventing the original World War II 1/4‑ton jeep in 1940. (Note: To be distinguished from the U.S. Army's first ever series-produced, light 4‑wheel drive trucks, which were half-ton rated – developed by Dodge, and supplied to the Army earlier that same year as the Dodge VC series – and which were also called "jeeps" by soldiers.) The company's founders, Roy Evans and William A. Ward Jr., combined resources to purchase the assets of the bankrupt American Austin Car Company in August of 1935 during liquidation.

In 1935 the new company produced vehicles based on the American Austin tooling, operating as Evans Operations Inc. The new company was incorporated as American Bantam Car Company in June 1936. The new company launched a public fundraising campaign and redesigned their entire vehicle line to launch a completely refreshed selection of American Bantam roadsters and delivery vans in 1937. The company continued to make vehicles into 1943, until all of its production – like all the U.S. automotive industry – served the World War II efforts, with vehicles and weapons manufacturing, including (amphibious) cargo trailers, aircraft controls and other parts, and engines and tail gearing for torpedoes.

== History ==
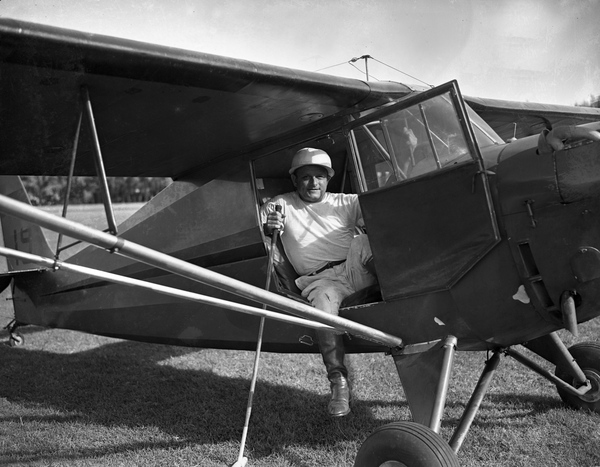
American Bantam Car Company president Roy S. Evans in a plane at the Gulfstream Polo Club, circa 1945

On June 2, 1936, Roy Evans and his co-founders incorporated American Bantam Car Company in Pennsylvania and transferred the assets purchased from the American Austin Car Company, along with $500 in cash to the new company. In early 1937, Evans phoned Count Alexis de Sakhnoffsky, the original Austin body designer, and asked him to design a new line of bodies improvised around the existing tooling. No funds were available for a costly styling program, much less to engineer new body dies, so the new design had to use as much of the original tooling as possible.

In early 1937 Alexis de Sakhnoffsky visited the American Bantam factory in Butler, Pennsylvania, and designed a completely new front grille, new front fenders and new rear fenders. The Austin engine was also redesigned with a new aluminum induction system and cylinder head, retaining the 45.6 cubic inch (747 cc) displacement, but while adopting a fully pressurized oil system, increasing the compression ratio by 40% to a 7:1 ratio and implementing plain babbitt crankshaft bearings to produce 20 horsepower at 4,000 rpm, a 50% improvement over the Austin engine. American Bantam's 1938 model was the inspiration for Donald Duck's car which was first seen in Don Donald (1937). Despite a wide range of Bantam body styles, ranging from light trucks to woodie station wagons, only about 6,000 Bantams of all types were produced. American Bantam continued to build cars until August 18, 1943.

== Invention of the Original Jeep ==
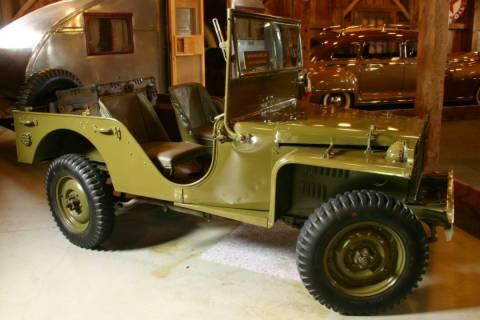
American Bantam BRC-40 mass production WWII jeep

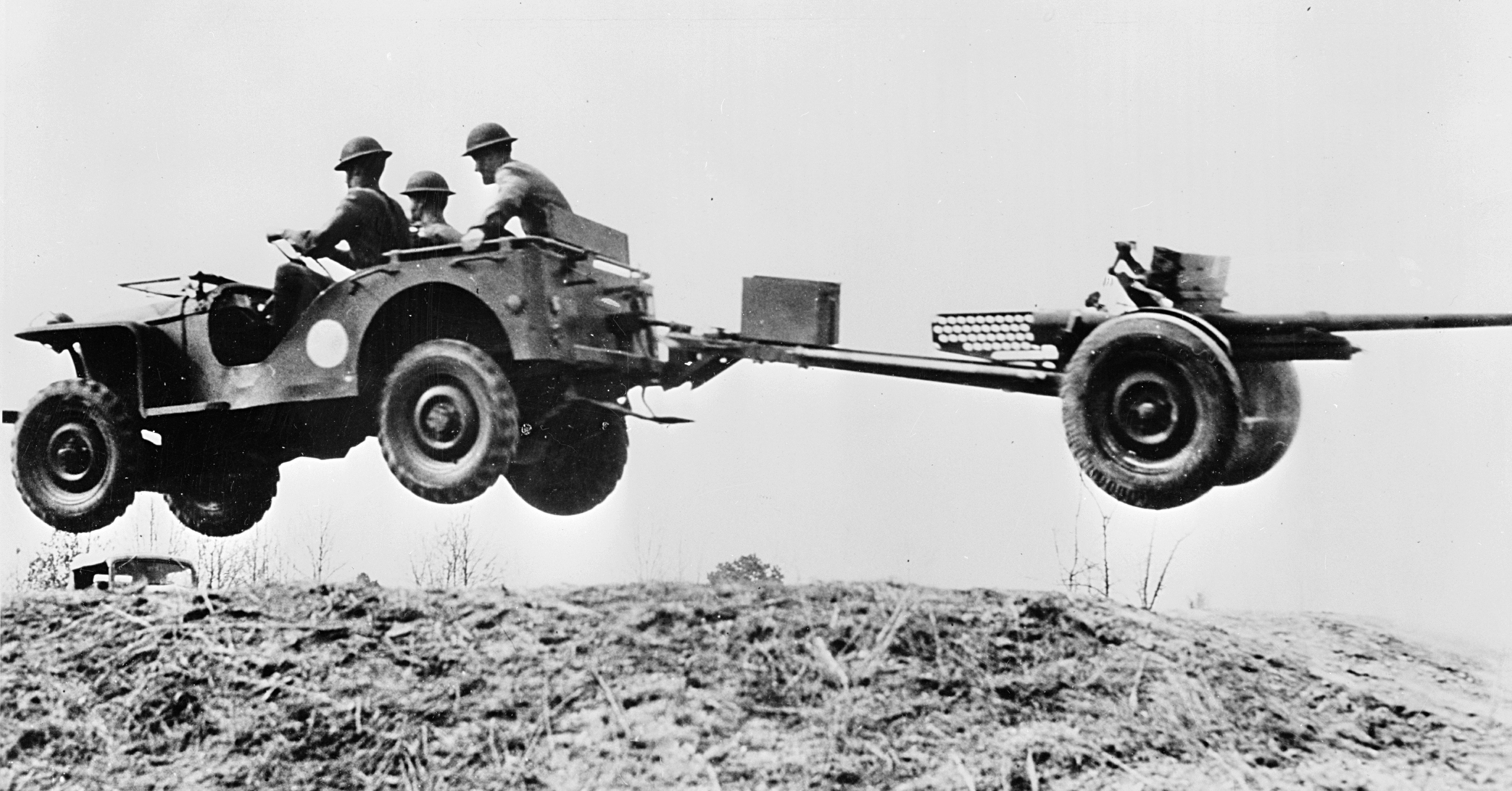
The 1941 Bantam BRC was strong enough for total lift-off, loaded with a full 3-man crew, and towing a 37mm anti-tank gun — this U.S. Army Signal Corps photo may have inspired the "Flying Jeep" poster, the 'Leaping Lena' nickname, etc.

American Bantam is credited with the invention of the original jeep and the first serial production military jeeps ordered by the U.S. Army in 1940.

The idea of a small, durable automobile to replace the horse was championed by American Bantam salesman Navy Commander Charles 'Harry' Payne (retired), working closely with Robert Brown, a civilian consultant working for the U.S. Army Quartermaster Corps (QMC), American Bantam chief engineer Harold Crist and American Bantam president Frank Fenn, who together during the spring of 1940 laid out the specifications for the first Bantam Reconnaissance Car. Harold Crist did the lion's share of specifying, conceiving, designing and building the car with Karl Probst drafting and formalizing pre-existing layout and specifications set out by Crist.

American Bantam delivered the first jeep to the QMC on September 23, 1940, at Camp Holabird, a U.S. Army base to the east of Baltimore, Maryland. Engineers from Ford and Willys-Overland were on-hand at Camp Holabird during testing to learn more about the new vehicle. The original jeep designs were handed over to Willys-Overland and Ford and became the basis for the design of the World War II jeep. After the delivery of the first jeep, American Bantam kicked off serial production of the Mark II (also called the BRC-60) jeeps with improvements suggested by the QMC. American Bantam was the sole manufacturer of jeeps put into service by the U.S. Army during 1940.

The word "Jeep" was first used to describe US Army "midget cars" in a January 1941 newspaper article, mentioning "Bantam" as the manufacturer. At the time American Bantam was the only manufacturer that had actually fulfilled purchase orders to deliver Jeeps to the US Army. Rumors say "Jeep" is a phonetic pronunciation of the abbreviation GP. However, GP was a Ford internal production designation, and Ford did not start delivering Jeeps to the US Army until April 1941, after news of "Jeeps" made by "Bantam" had already been widely reported in newspapers nationwide. As the US Army had not yet decided which manufacturer to choose, Ford may have chosen the letters GP to associate the Ford with the Jeep vehicle already made popular by American Bantam.

All together American Bantam built 2,675 jeeps from 1940 through 1943, with the bulk of those vehicles being delivered during 1941. More than half of the initial production went to the British Army, and some to the Soviet Union. Some of the motors and chassis were imported from Toledo, Ohio; the original bodies were made at the American Bantam factory in Butler, Pennsylvania.

The Bantam company produced the most fuel-efficient engine and first prototype under the original U.S. Army tender specifications and was awarded the first contract. However, because elements favorable to Ford within the Quartermaster Corps claimed that Bantam lacked production capacity to produce the vehicle on the scale needed by the Army, the awarding of ongoing contracts was reopened. Eventually the Army gave the BRC (Bantam Reconnaissance Car) 40 designs to Willys-Overland and awarded the bulk of orders to Willys and Ford, while Bantam went on to produce jeep trailers (T-3).

After World War II American Bantam continued to make trailers for the consumer market. In 1943 American Bantam launched an Advertising campaign boasting that "Ivan got his first Jeep from Bantam" in response to an application by Willys-Overland to the United States Patent and Trademark Office to trademark "JEEP" filed on February 13, 1943.

Trailer production continued until the company was taken over by American Rolling Mills in 1956.

== Gallery ==
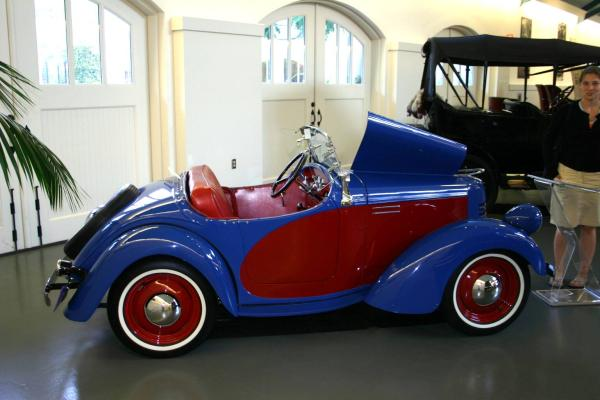
1939 American Bantam

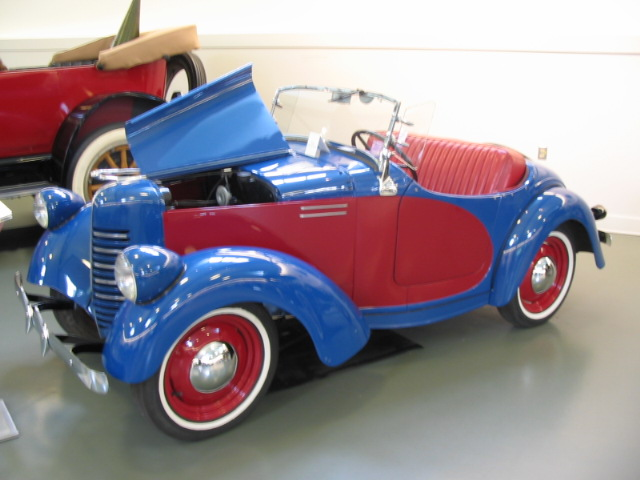
Another view of the 1939 American Bantam

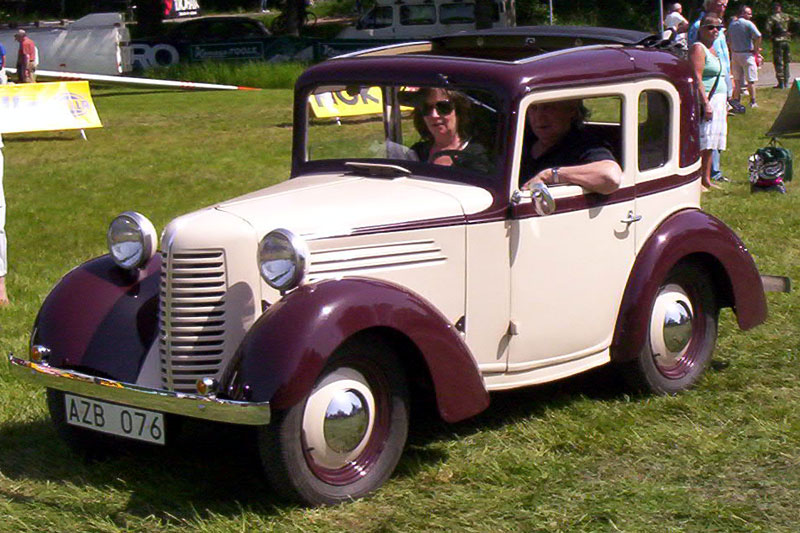
Bantam Model 60 Coupé 1938

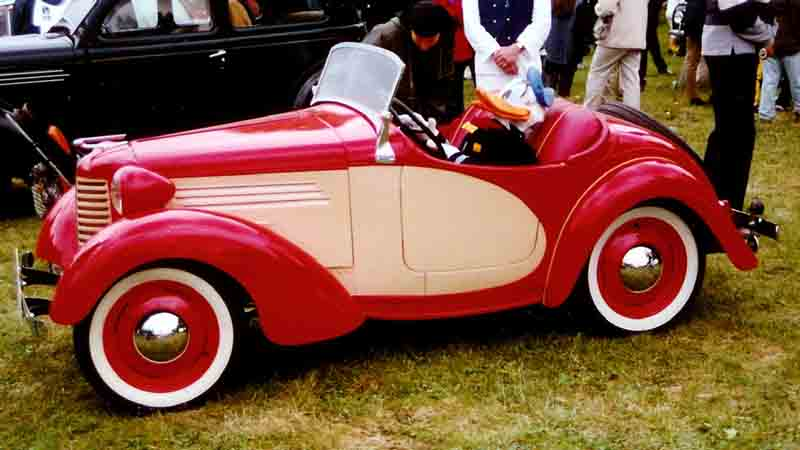
Bantam Model 60 Roadster 1938

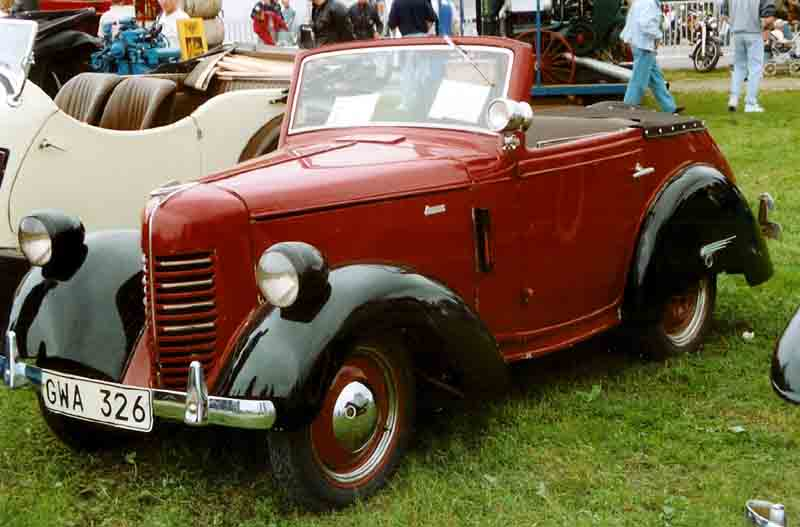
Bantam Model 60 Convertible 1939

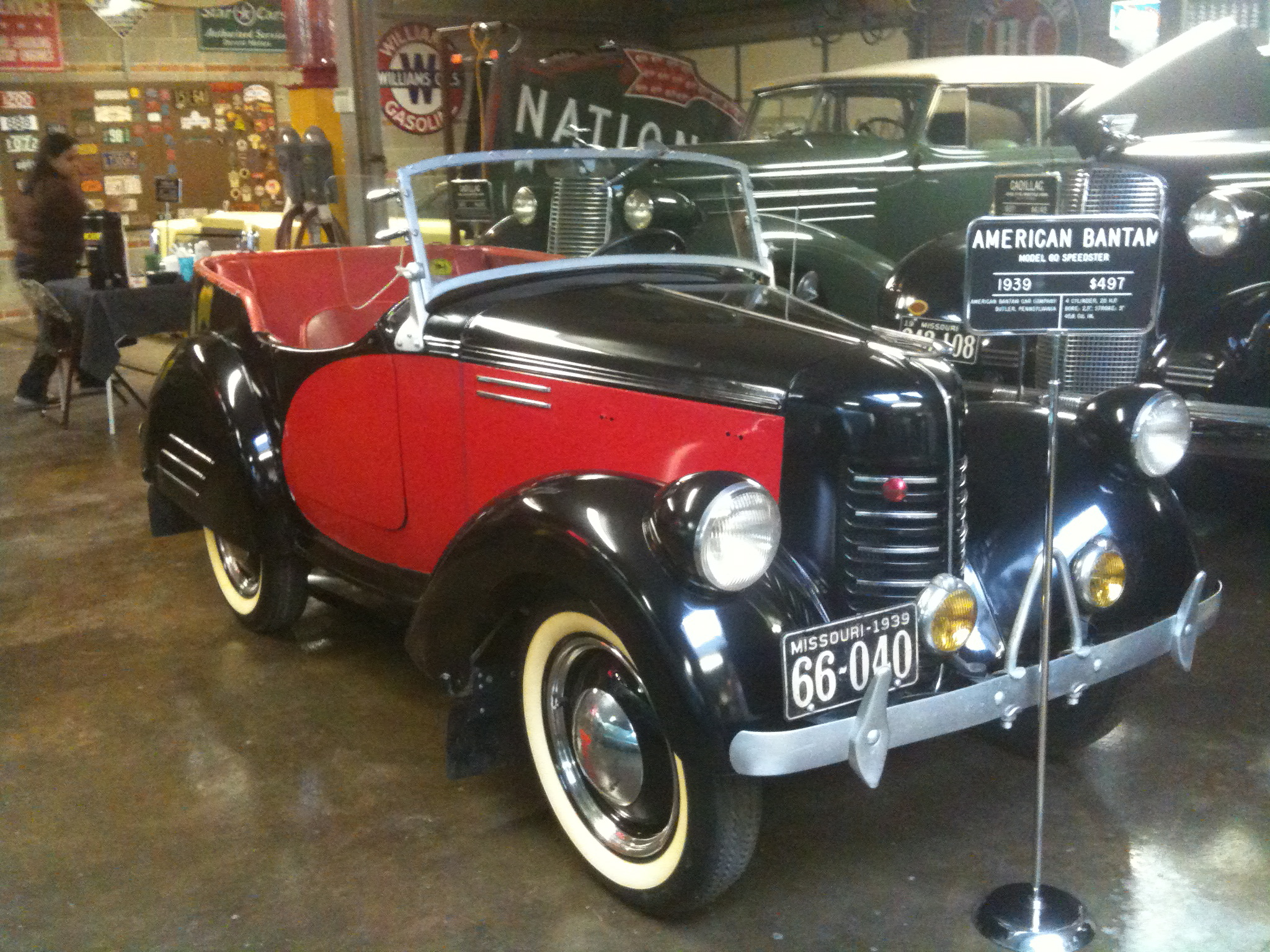
American Bantam Model 60 Speedster Convertible 1939

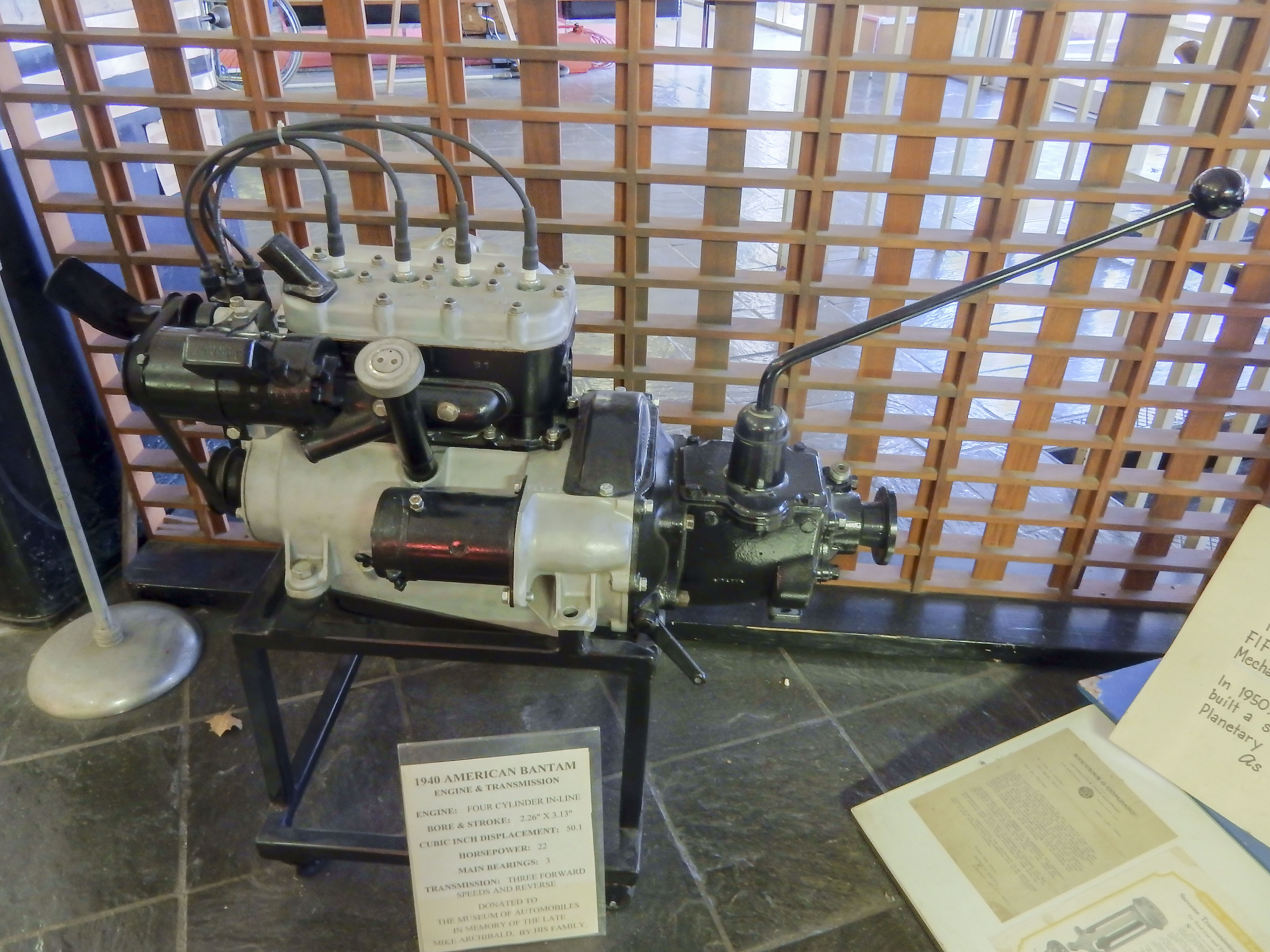
1940 American Bantam engine and transmission

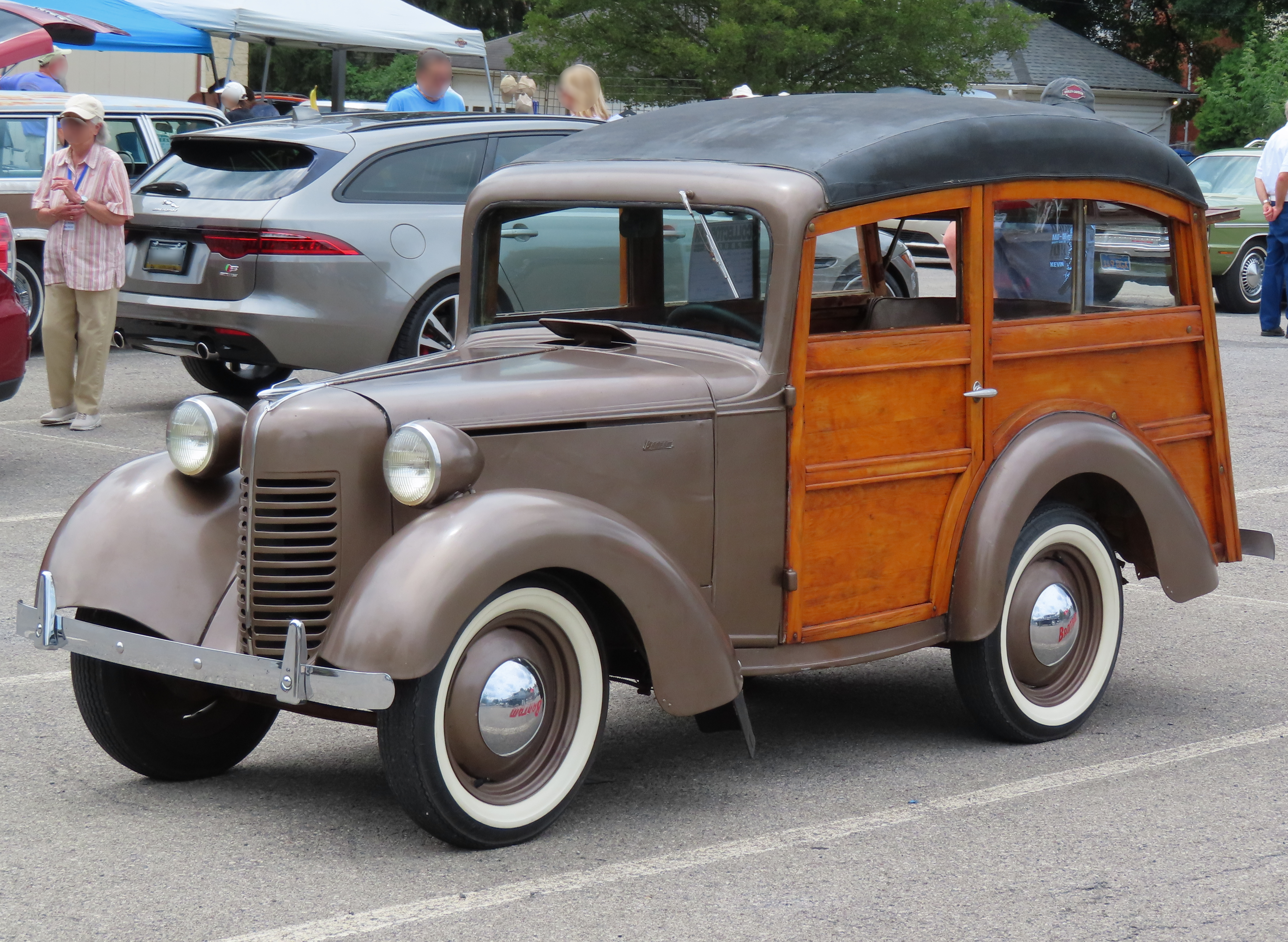
1940 Bantam Super 4 station wagon, front view

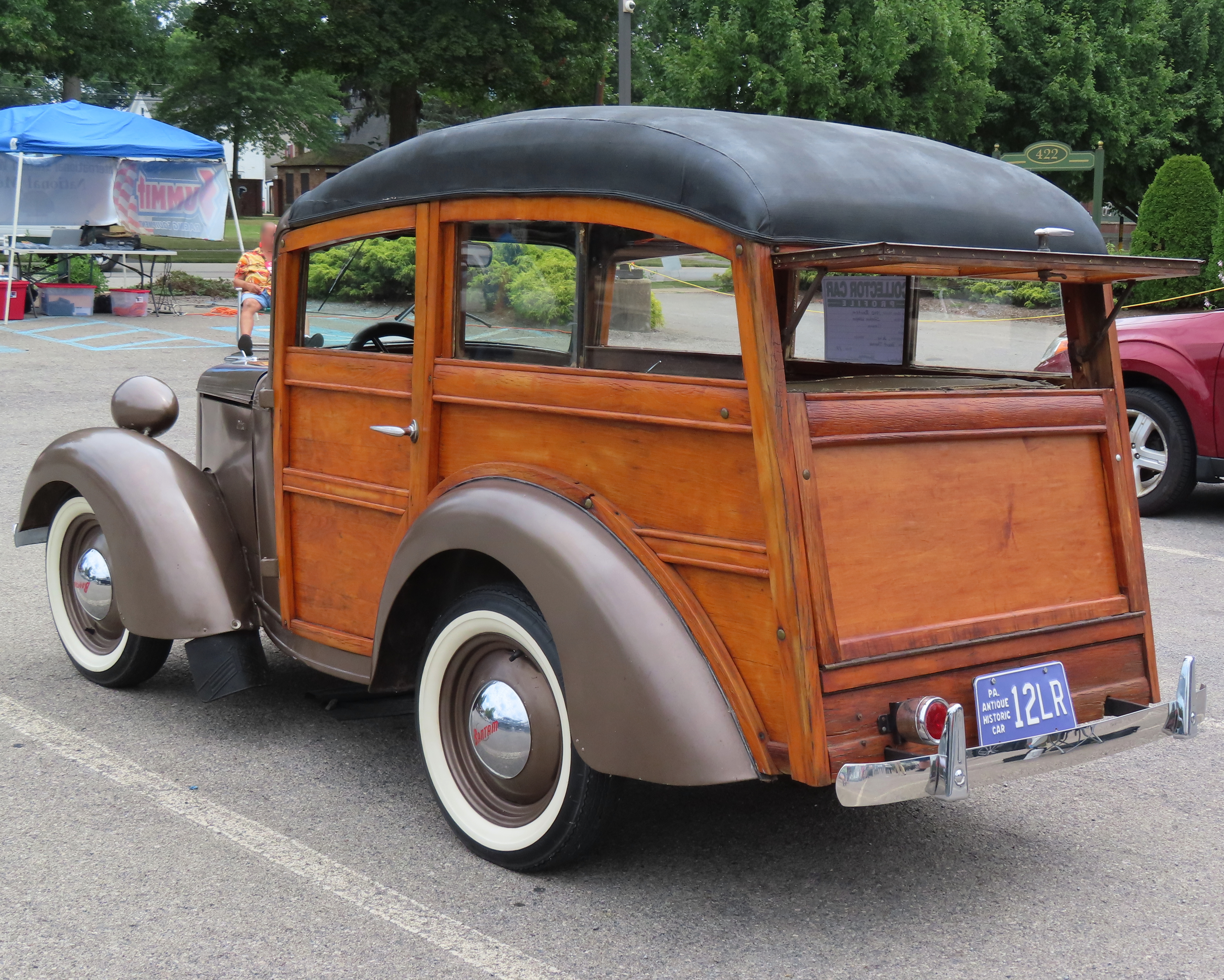
1940 Bantam Super 4 station wagon, rear view

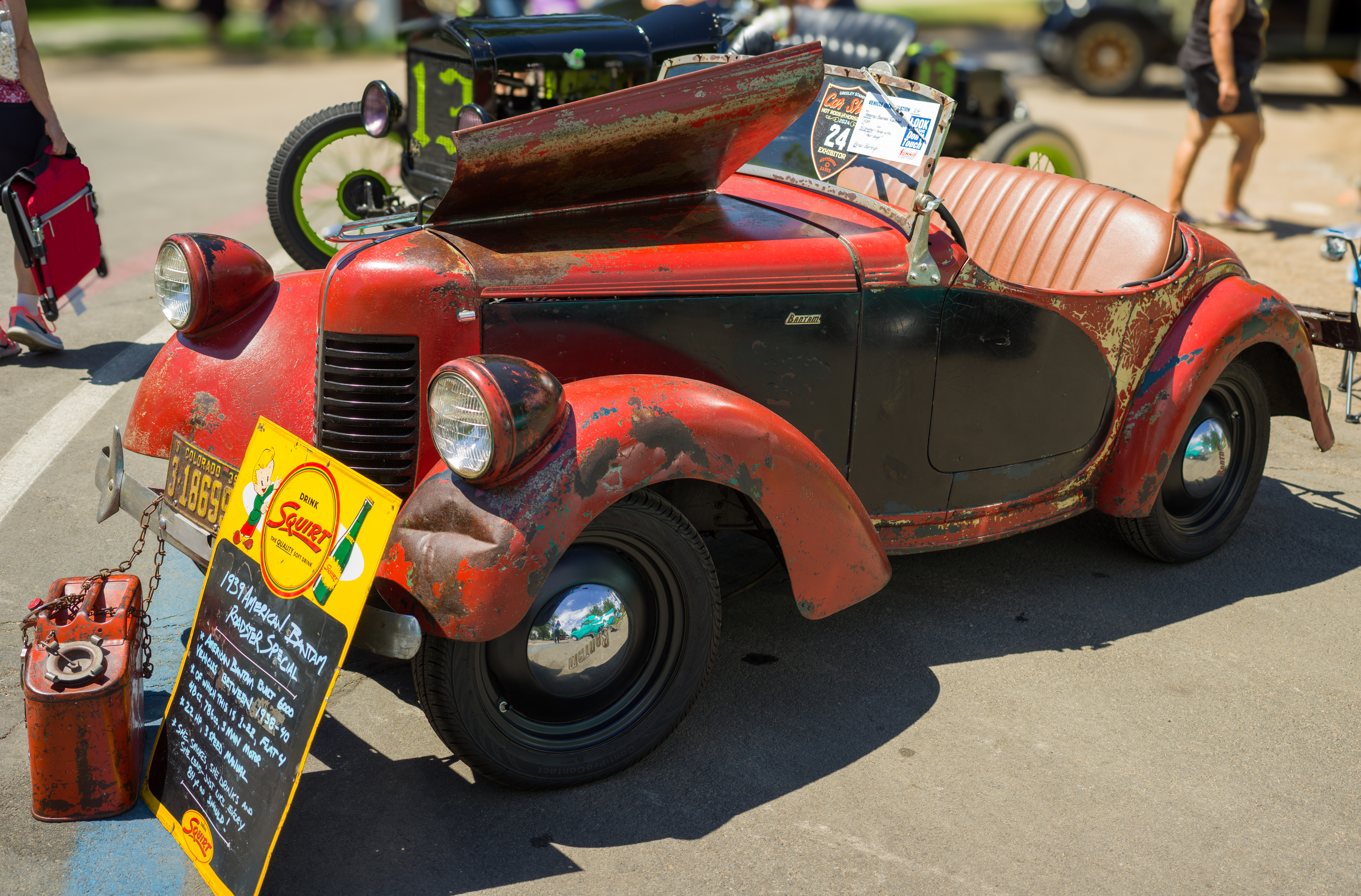
1939 Bantam Roadster Special
