= Allen County Museum =

Historic house in Ohio, United States

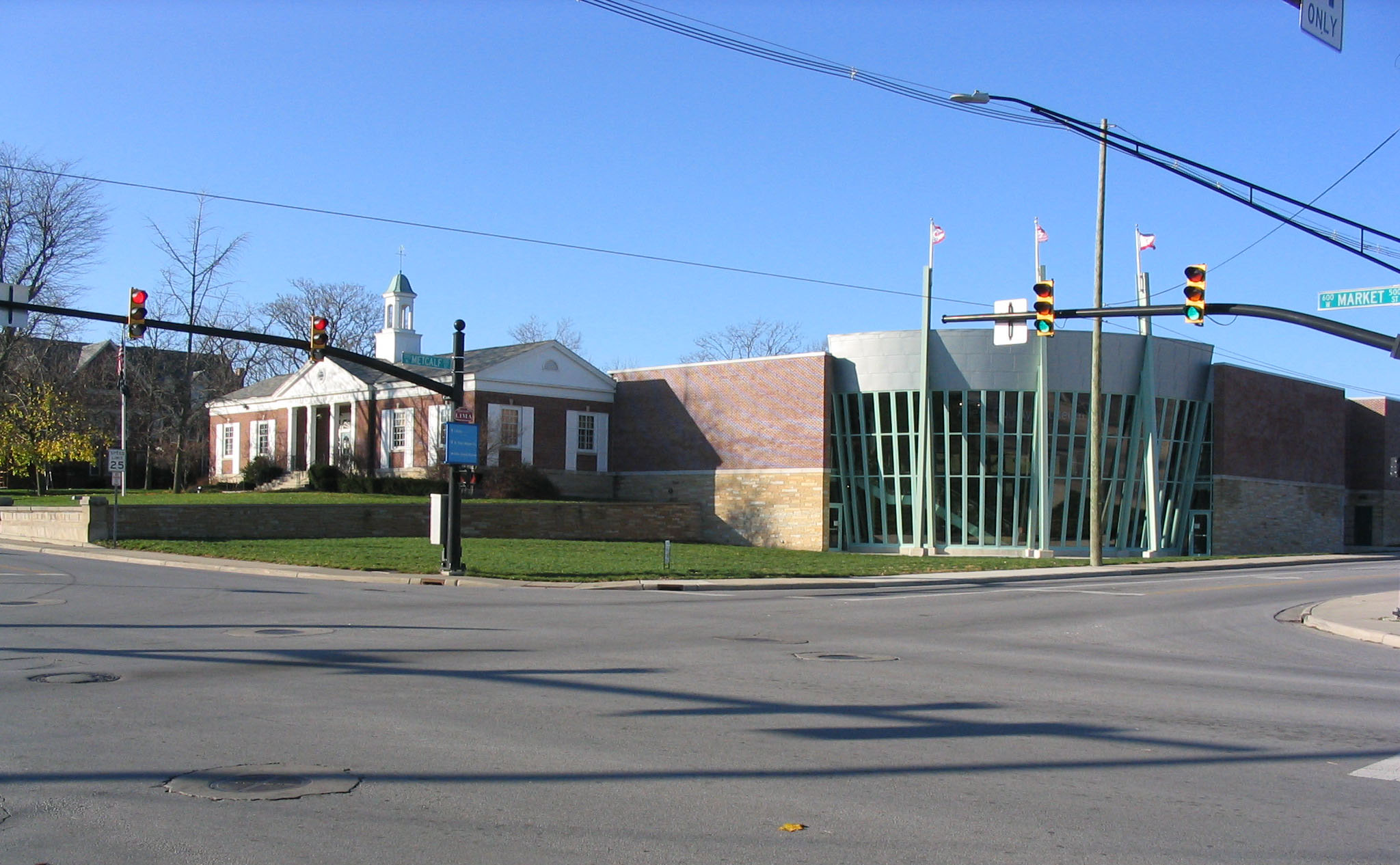
- Established: 1908
- Location: 620 West Market Street; Lima, Ohio 45801 United States
- Coordinates: 40°44′25.9872″N 84°6′49.8528″W
- Type: Children's Museum, History Museum
- Website: Allen County Museum

The Allen County Museum is located in the city of Lima, the county seat of Allen County, Ohio, United States. Occupying a half city block, the museum campus includes the main museum building, a log house, the MacDonell House (a Victorian mansion), a Shay Locomotive display, the Children's Discovery Center, genealogy and local history library, railroad archives, and the Children's Garden. The museum is accredited by the American Alliance of Museums. According to recent reports of the American Alliance of Museums Accreditation Department, less than 800 museums, out of more than 11,000 in the United States, are accredited. Standards for accreditation apply across the board to both small and large institutions.

== History ==
The Allen County Museum is operated by the Allen County Historical Society which was formed in 1908. Originally located in Lima's Memorial Hall, the Historical Society outgrew the available space by 1935, and began privately raising funds to build a museum. Spearheaded by Elizabeth M. MacDonell, and supported by the notable John Wesley Van Dyke, Chairman of the Atlantic Refining Company, the organization successfully raised the needed funds to build a separate facility.

World War II interrupted construction plans, but by 1954 the cornerstone was laid—a stone from the original White House, Washington, D.C. Since that time, the Historical Society has amassed a large collection of items—both local and international. Archival and documentary railroad collections include builder's prints and diagrams from the Lima Locomotive Works, which was the third largest steam locomotive builder in the United States. Central to the production of the Lima Locomotive Works was the Shay engine, invented by Ephraim Shay.

== Notable Exhibits ==
=== Sheriff Sarber/ John Dillinger Jail Cell ===
One of the museums most popular exhibits is a replica 1930's county jail cell; the exhibit portrays life-size wax figurines of infamous gangster and bank robber John Dillinger and local police Sheriff Jess Sarber. In May 1933, Dillinger had made parole after serving a nine and a half year prison sentence at the Indiana Reformatory and Indiana State Prison. A month after his parole, Dillinger began his bank robbing spree. After robbing banks in New Carlisle and Bluffton, Ohio, Dayton police captured Dillinger in August 1933 and delivered him to the Allen County Jail in Lima where he was held in connection to his crimes. Upon entrance into the jail, Dillinger was searched where investigators found prison escape plans. When asked about the papers, Dillinger refused to answer. The papers were a blueprint for the escape of eight prisoners, known as the First Dillinger Gang. The plans, already in the hands of the prisoners, proved successful and the convicts escaped their prison cells four days after Dillinger's capture. Three of Dillinger's men: Pete Piermont, Russell Clark, and Charles Mackley made their way to the Lima jail where they impersonated Indiana State police officers seeking to extradite Dillinger back to Indiana. When Sheriff Sarber asked for identification, Piermont shot and killed Sarber. The three then unlocked Dillinger's cell and escaped back to Indiana where they met up with the rest of the gang. The exhibit is a testament to the life and work of Sheriff Sarber, displaying artifacts and newspapers of the Sheriff's work and heroism. The death of Sheriff Sarber also led the FBI to name Dillinger Public Enemy #1.

=== Shay Locomotive ===
After the expansion of the museum from 2006 to 2009, the No. 10 Shay Locomotive Engine found its new home behind of the museum's iron clad window structure, making it the visual centerpiece of the museum. The Engine was manufactured by the Lima Locomotive Works in 1925 for the Lima Stone Company. The engine is a 3-foot gauge, two-truck geared locomotive and weighs approximately 24 ton. The stone company that used the locomotive operated a quarry near E. North Street in Lima from about 1914 to 1933. The locomotive was rescued in 1953 only hours before being cut up for scrap, and was restored at no cost by Baldwin-Lima-Hamilton for the Allen County Historical Society. The train was placed on a lot on Metcalf Street where a shelter was built around it until it was permanently relocated inside the museum. The locomotive is just one example of the numerous engines to come out of the city of Lima. During its height, Lima Locomotive Works was the third largest producer of steam locomotive engines.

=== Native American Artifacts ===
The museum has a significant collection of Native American artifacts including art, pottery, clothing, arrowheads, and other remnants of the original inhabitants. Collections are categorized by the period in which the artifacts belong, going as far back as during the time of the Ice Age nearly 10,000 years ago. The largest collection of artifacts are from early and late modern history and show objects that were used in everyday life by the Native Americans. One particular sign shows the original boundaries of the Shawnee Reservation that was allocated to the tribes to live on. Later treaties would force the natives West from this land. Another exhibit shows a recreation of the remains of a prehistoric Glacial Kame burial. The Kame people were a group of Native Americans who lived in the area about 4,000 years ago. The mock skeleton shows the ritual process of burying the individual in a flexed position with their legs drawn up against the upper torso. The original skeleton was discovered in 1960 along with others in a mass burial just outside the city; the site is one of three burial sites located within Allen County.

=== George Washington's Mount Vernon ===
On the upper level, the museum has an encased model of life at President Washington's Mount Vernon. The model shows the daily life of workers and family on the plantation and displays the floor plan and rooms of the mansion. George S. Pond and his son Stanton began the project in 1935 and took almost two and half years to complete. The model is an intricate work of art with thousands of pieces distinctly designed for the mansion. An example of complexity and dedication is the house's roofing shingles; more than 8,000 pieces were individually stained, polished, and placed on the model. The model also comes with doors with actual working hinges and can open and close with personally designed keys and locks. The room in which the exhibit is displayed houses a variety of priceless artifacts including French Canton glassware used by Washington and his staff, busts of famous Americans, original pages from the ledger of King George III with the King's actual signatures affixed on the top, and an original 1795 American flag.

=== Vehicles & Carriages ===
The museum houses an impressive collection of motorized and non-motorized vehicles. The collection includes Milburn Light Electric Car made by the Milburn Wagon Company in 1923, a 1909 gasoline powered Locomobile Sports Roadster, a J.K. Fetter & Son Studebaker wagon, William Cron & Sons single horse buggy, a restored 1920's Meadow Gold Milk Wagon, a 1925 Ford Model T Roadster, and a 1908 Thor Single Engine Motorcycle. The museum also displays a fully restored Gramm-Bernstein "Liberty Truck." From 1917 to 1919, over 5,000 of the U.S. Army Liberty Trucks were built in Lima by the Gramm-Bernstein and Garford companies. A strict standardization code was placed on the vehicles thus allowing the parts to be interchangeable if need be. These vehicles saw significant use in Europe and the United States during World War I.

=== Unique ===
The museum is also known for its vast collection of unique artifacts such as housing the world's largest collection of albino animals, replica room of Noah's Ark, two horse-drawn hearses (one with a display coffin still inside), and an interactive Native American Wigwam. Perhaps the most unusual exhibit is its collection of over one hundred objects removed from the mouth, throat, or esophagus by doctors Walter and Estey Yingling. The objects vary from coins, bones, teeth, buttons to larger pieces such as jewelry, bobby pins, a screw, keys, and a rubber hose.

== MacDonell House ==
- MacDonell House
- U.S. National Register of Historic Places
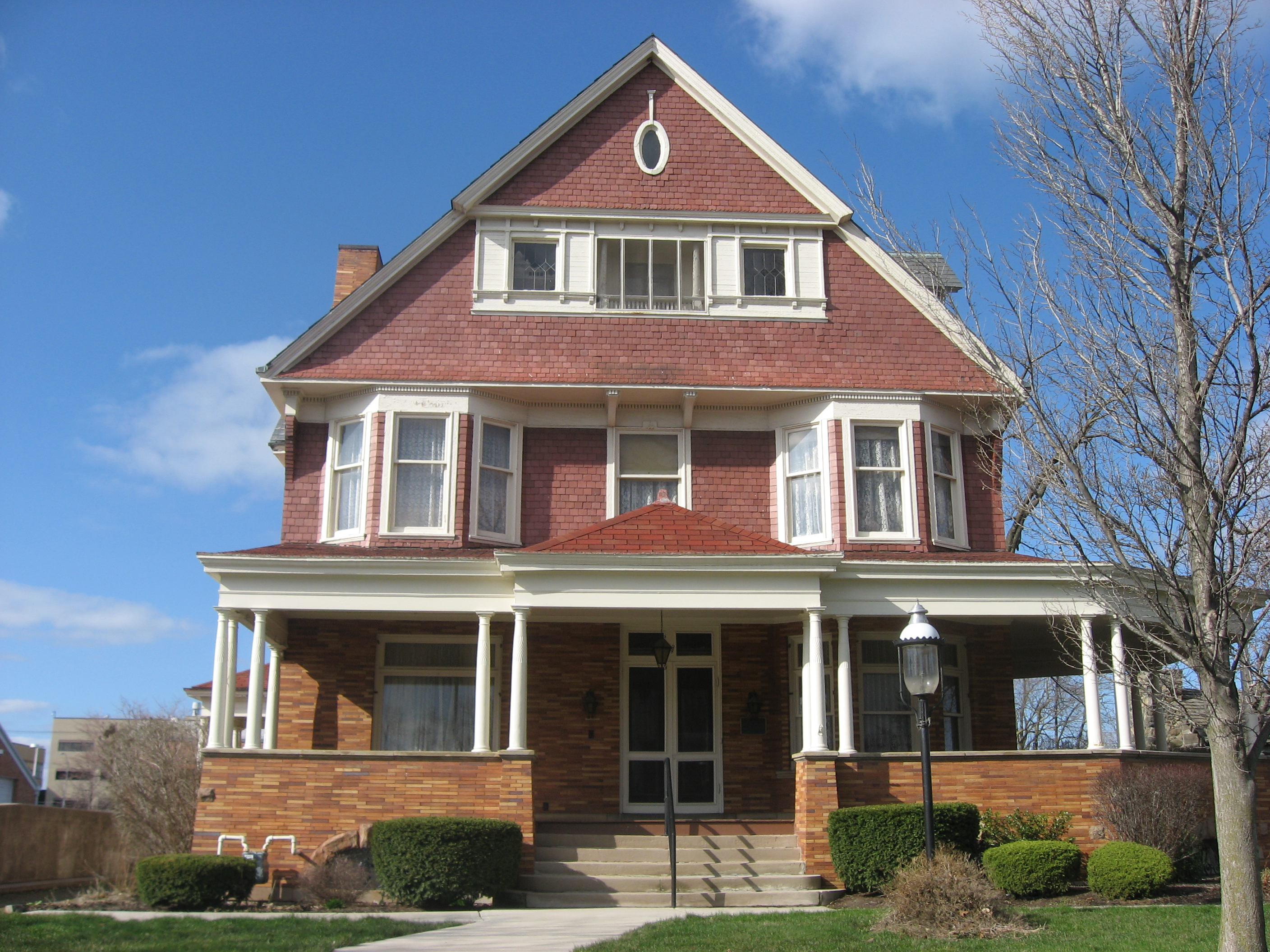
- Front of the house

- Location within Ohio Location within the United States
- Location: 632 W. Market St., Lima, Ohio
- Coordinates: 40°44′25″N 84°6′58″W
- Area: less than one acre
- Built: 1893
- Architectural style: Shingle Style
- NRHP reference No.: 78001999
- Added to NRHP: September 20, 1978

The MacDonnell House, also known as Banta-Van Dyke House, is a Shingle style house that was built in 1893. It was listed on the National Register of Historic Places in 1978. The listing included two contributing buildings.

== Outreach ==
The Museum offers monthly lectures and programs, Traveling Trunks, demonstrations, and special events, including the annual Christmas Tree Festival.
