= Milburn Light Electric =

Early line of electric automobile (1914 to 1923)

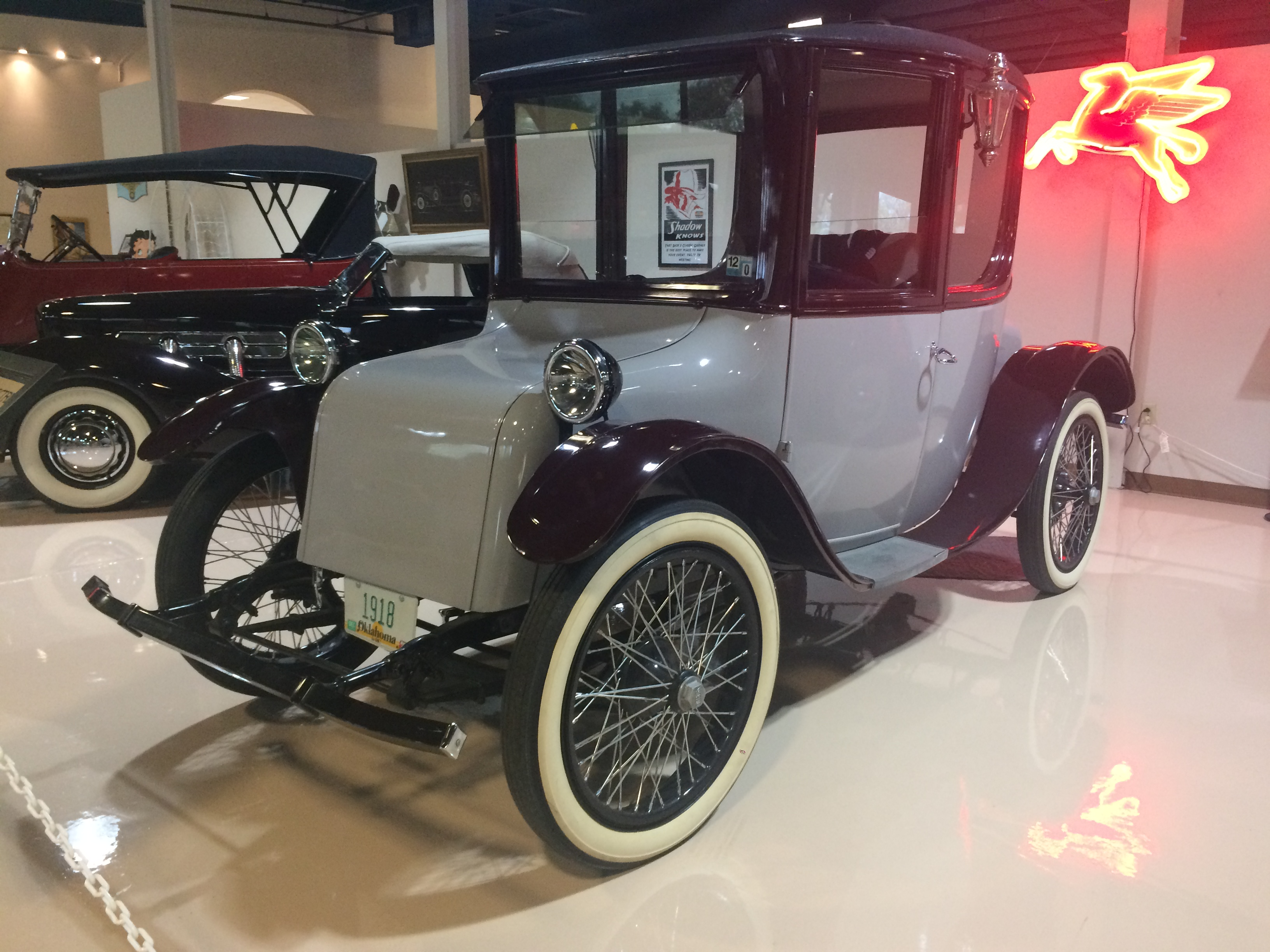
1917 Milburn Light Electric Model 27 Brougham

The Milburn Light Electric is an early line of electric automobiles that was manufactured by the Milburn Wagon Company of Toledo, Ohio between 1914 and 1923. Approximately 4,000 Milburn Light Electric vehicles were produced. Few survive, with only 56 examples being known as of 2024. The Milburn Light Electric was initially offered in two body styles: coupe and roadster. Over its production run, several additional body styles were introduced: brougham, sedan, town car, light delivery vehicle, truck, and taxicab. The brougham ultimately proved to be the most popular body style.

The Milburn Light Electric was the most affordable and one of the most financially successful models of electric automobile in its day. Nevertheless, its sales were still relatively low compared to gas automobiles, and it was largely regarded to be a status symbol for the professional class, both prohibitively expensive and functionally impractical for the working class. Interiors and exteriors featured high-quality craftsmanship, owing the Milburn Wagon Company's long experience in passenger vehicle manufacture. The initial 1915 model year was designed by Karl Probst, and was lighter in weight than earlier electric automobiles. Innovative features included a primitive form of dynamic braking. In 1920, Milburn began selling removable battery packs to address concerns about the limited per-charge range of the automobile.

Much of the advertising for the Milburn Light Electric was marketed towards female drivers, as conventional assumptions of the era held that female drivers were more inclined to prefer electric vehicles than male drivers. The United States Secret Service and U.S. President Woodrow Wilson himself owned and drove Milburn Light Electrics during his presidency. Production of the Milburn Light Electric ceased in 1923, mere months after the Milburn Wagon Company sold its Toledo manufacturing facility to General Electric.

== Design and specifications ==
1915 newspaper illustration depicting a female owner connecting a coupe's battery-recharging setup to a power source

The original 1915 model was designed by Karl Probst. The Light Electric's batteries were positioned on trays beneath its front and rear hoods. Light Electrics featured an early version of dynamic braking, with stored energy being used to aid its two mechanical wheel brakes. The coupe and brougham models of the Light Electric featured simple tiller controls, with two horizontal levers for control of speed and steering. The cars had four speeds in forward steering and two speeds for reverse steering. The roadster and sedan models had steering wheels, while the "town car" model had a steering wheel for its open-air chauffeur seat and a tiller in the enclosed compartment.

Milburn had a long history of manufacturing passenger coaches, which was well-demonstrated in the craftsmanship of the Light Electric. Interior and exterior finishings of the cars were of high quality. The car was also lower to the ground, lighter weight, and more affordably-priced than most electric vehicles before it had been. 1915 models had a wheelbase measuring 110 inches (2,800 mm), and a chassis holding a 2-horsepower motor manufactured by General Electric. Excluding the weight of its batteries, the 1915 coupe model weighed 1,400 pounds (640 kg). The 1917 models were powered by thirteen 6-volt batteries, with its General Electric motor having 3.36 horsepower.

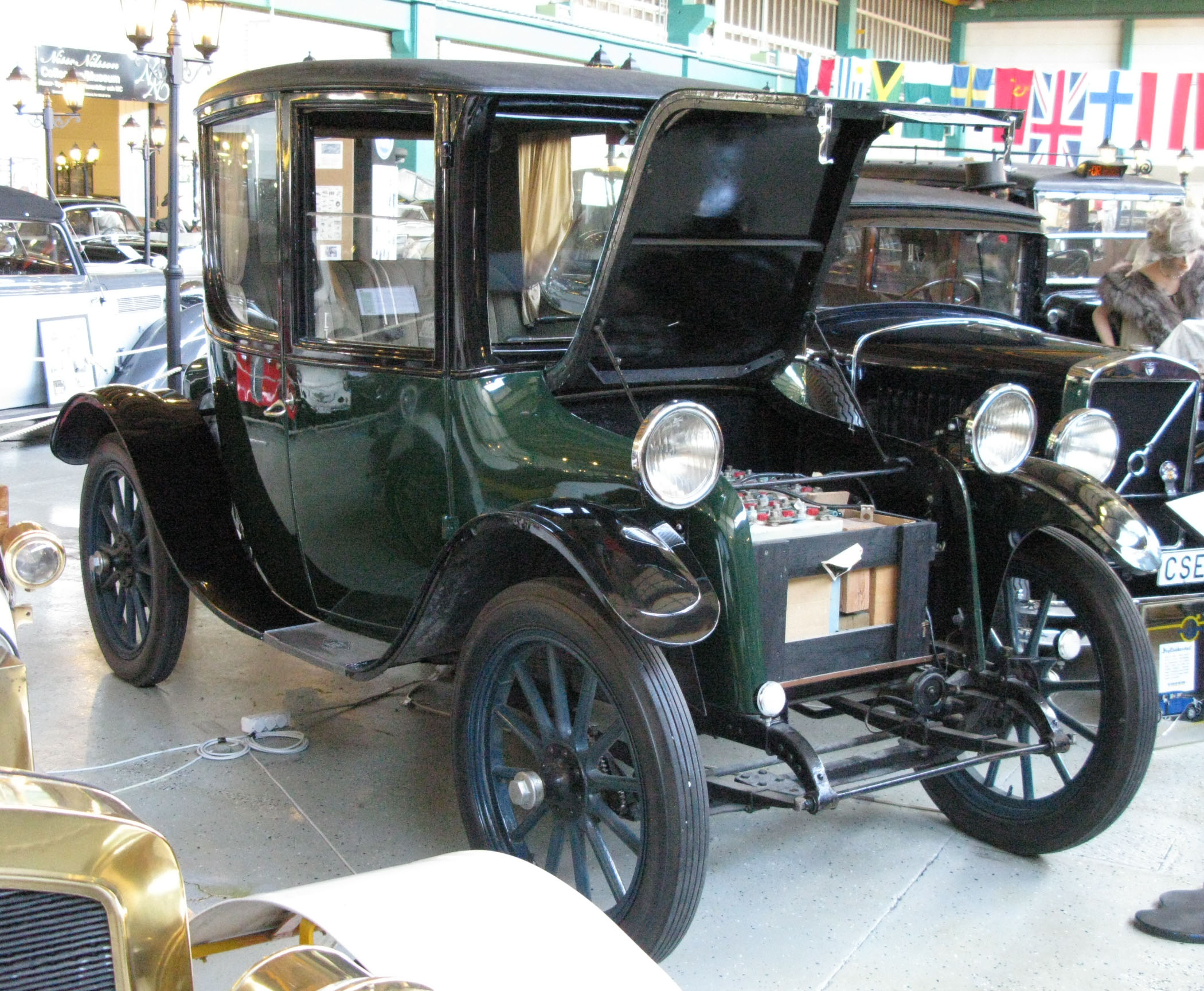
1919 Milburn Light Electric Model 27 Brougham at Autoseum in Sweden, with hood lifted to display battery tray

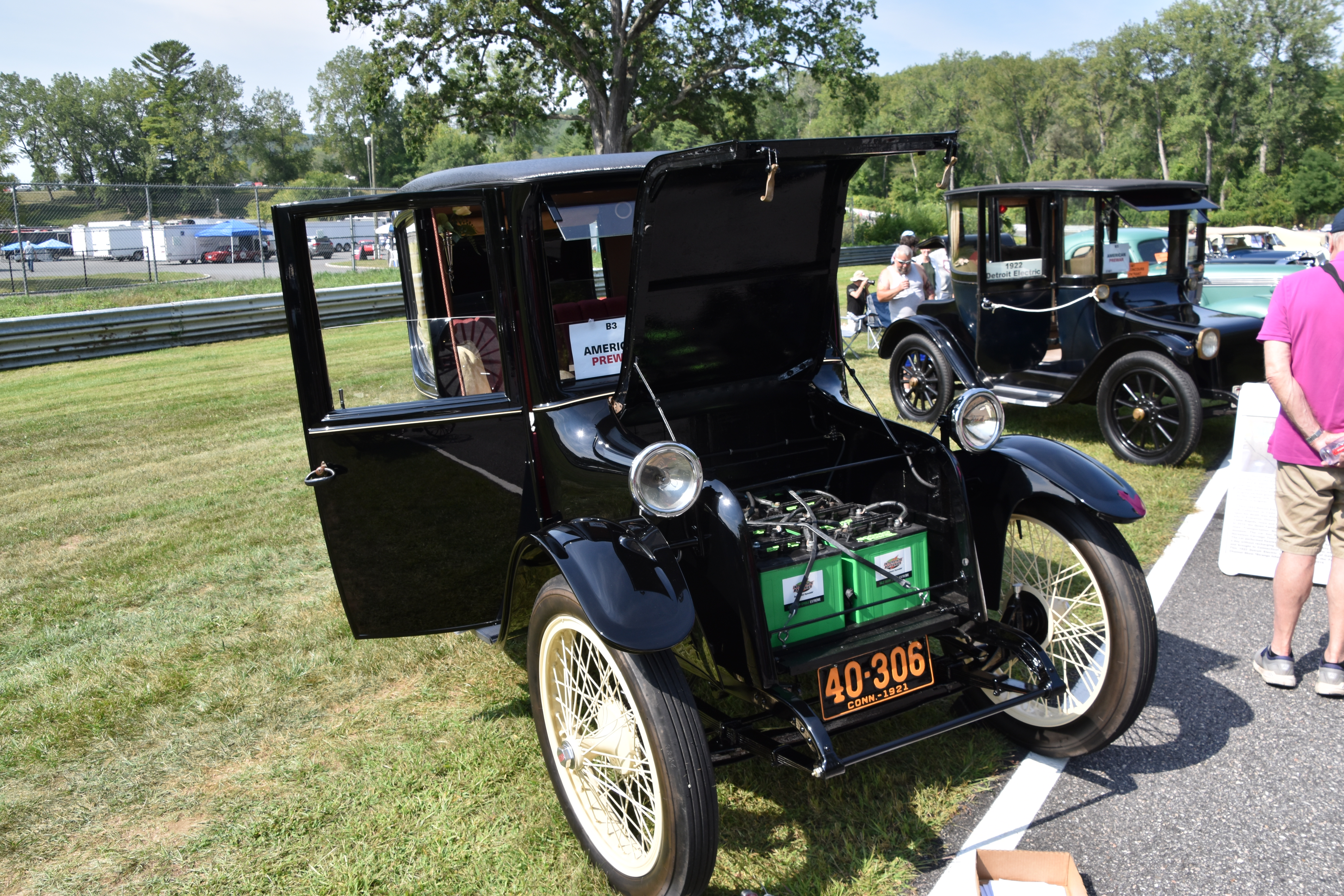
surviving 1921 Milburn Light Electric Model 27 Brougham with front hood lifted to display removable batteries

Weaknesses of the car included limited range, as it ran out of power far quicker than gasoline vehicles of its era. Early Light Electrics typically required its battery to be fully recharged after every 50 miles (80 km). In the 1917 model year, the range for battery charges was between 60 to 70 miles (97 to 113 km). In an effort to address this weakness, in 1917, a battery swap service was made available for Milburn Electric owners in Chicago. In 1920 Milburn began producing replaceable battery kits, with the batteries featuring rollers for ease of insertion and removal by car owners. Additionally, limited advancements in battery technology and improvements in the design of the General Motors motors used for Milburn Electrics meant that, by the 1921 model year, Milburn Electrics had an extended range of 90 miles (140 km) per charge.

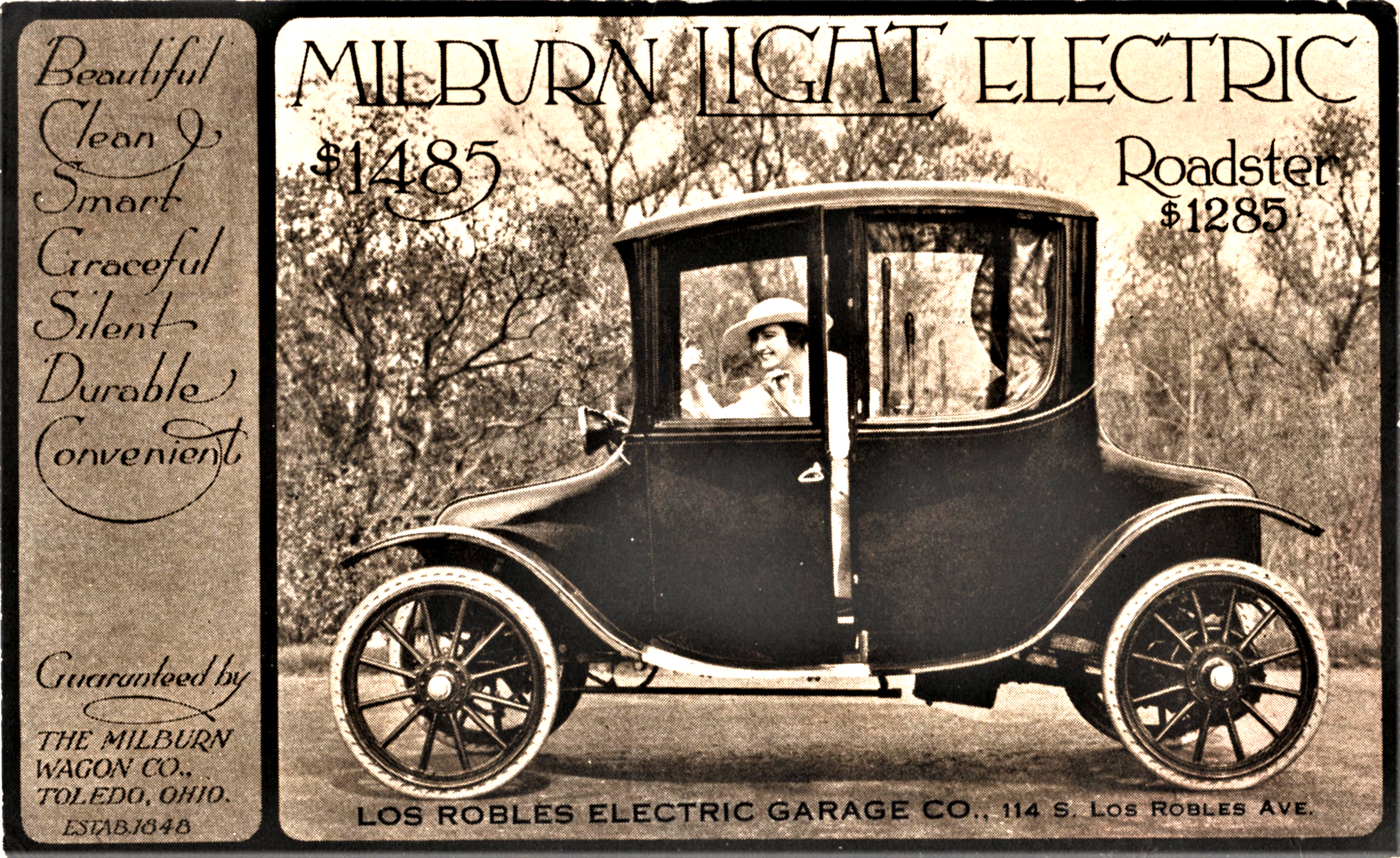
1915 dealership advertisements

The Milburn Electric lacked speed, with its 1915 coupe model topping-out at 15 mph (24 km/h) and its 1915 roadster model topping out at 19 mph (31 km/h). and had difficulty powering up steep grades. Improvements in General Electric engines used allowed models produced circa 1921 to achieve top speeds between 25 mph (40 km/h) and 30 mph (48 km/h).

While the car was initially only offered in two body styles in its first model year: the Model 15 coupe and the Model 151 roadster. Beginning in the second model year, the range of body styles expanded to ultimately include brougham, sedan, "town car", and light delivery vehicle body styles. The "town car" model was a touring car, and was also advertised as a limousine. It featured an open driver's seat and covered rear seats. The light transport model featured a cargo area behind a front row of seats, In 1920, the Model 33 taxicab variant was produced and sold to companies in Chicago and St. Louis. In 1922, two truck variants were produced: the Model 43 (with a 0.5 tonnes (0.49 long tons; 0.55 short tons) chassis was sold for $1,585) and the Model 40 (with a 1 tonne (0.98 long tons; 1.1 short tons) chassis, sold for $1,985).

| Year(s) | Model | Wheelbase | Body style |
|---|---|---|---|
| 1915–1916 | Model 15 | 110 inches (2,800 mm) | coupe |
| 1915–1916 | Model 15L | 110 inches (2,800 mm) | roadster |
| 1915–1916 | Model 22 Brougham | | brougham |
| 1916 | Model 16 | | light delivery vehicle |
| 1917–1918 | Model 27 Brougham | | brougham |
| 1917–18 | Model 27D | | light delivery vehicle |
| 1917–1918 | Town Car | | touring car |
| 1918 | Model 30 | | sedan |
| 1919–1924 | Model 27L Brougham | | brougham |
| 1920 | Model 33 | | taxicab |
| 1922 | Model 40 | | truck |
| 1922 | Model 43 | | truck |

== Manufacture and sales ==
November 1914 newspaper advertisement announcing the arrival of Milburn Light Electrics at a Davenport, Iowa dealership

The first consumer Light Electrics (the 1915 models) were produced on the company's assembly line in September 1914. Milburn manufactured approximately 4,000 vehicles of the model in its Toledo, Ohio facility, with the last being produced in 1923. The 1915 model year came in two body styles: the Model 15 coupe (sold for $1,485) the Model 151 roadster (sold for $1,285). Both used the same wheelbase, chassis, and motor setup.

advertisement, run in the February 1917 issue of Country Life

The car was marketed as ideal for women, as it was cleaner, quieter, and more appealing than gasoline powered automobiles of the era (which were considered odorous, loud, and challenging to control). They also did not have to cranked up to start (which was often a very physically challenging and sometimes dangerous chore), as was required of most gasoline powered cars of the era. Most companies of the day believed that female consumers were more inclined to prefer electric cars, while male consumers were more likely to prefer gas cars, thus Milburn and other manufacturers featured well-dressed women in its advertising in order to appeal to a female target demographic.

Despite being the lowest-priced electric vehicle available to consumers, Milburn Light Electrics were still relatively expensive. The high cost to purchase the Light Electric made it a prohibitive option for many consumers. Additionally, public appetite for early electric vehicles was already declining after the 1912 introduction of the electric starter for gasoline engines. The car, which had luxurious finishes, ultimately became regarded to be a status symbol. It was largely purchased by professionals and high-society members, whose daily needs could still be met by a vehicle possessing the limitations of the Milburn Light Electric. Nevertheless, if Milburn had more success than most other manufacturers of the day in sales of electric automobiles.

Initial year sales of the Milburn Light Electric were low, with sources indicating 1,000 1915 models produced and sold. In 1916, a varied range of Light Electric body styles were introduced. Sales in that second year increased marginally to 1,500, with the brougham body style proving the most popular body style.

The Milburn Electric served as a presidential state car, with President Woodrow Wilson and his U.S. Secret Service detail using 1918 model year Milburn Light Electrics to travel around Washington, D.C.. Wilson personally owned a 1918 model year Milburn Light Electric, and would drive it himself around the grounds of the White House. The Secret Service owned several Milburn Light Electrics, as it found the quite electric vehicle was ideal for use both in escorting the president at parades, and following the first family in their travel.

In 1919, the Milburn company plant was destroyed in a fire, which causes losses of $900,000 and destroyed 30 completed vehicles and even more incomplete vehicle bodies. Production was temporary moved to the grounds of Toledo University, where it resumed in January 1920.

The last model of Light Electric offered for sale was the Model 27L Light Brougham, which was produced in limited quantities for several years. General Motors purchased the Milburn body plant in February 1923. As part of the General Motors purchase of the facility, Milburn retained the right to produce electric automobiles. However, Milburn only continued to manufacture automobiles briefly briefly in to make use of its remaining stock of material and parts. The last Milburn Light Electric produced only two months after General Motors' purchase of the plant. After this, the company only produced trucks and on-demand vehicles.

Notable individuals who purchased new Milburn Light Electrics during its production run included U.S. President Woodrow Wilson, Waldemar Jungner (Note: Jungner owned a 1919 Model 27 Brougham through his business venture, Waldermar Juggler Co.) (Swedish inventor), Amos Alonzo Stagg (American sports celebrity), and Richard H. Wright (Durham, NC, tobacco magnate).

== Surviving examples ==
Few Milburn Light Electrics survive, with most examples being housed in museums and private collections. As of 2024, only 56 Milburn Light Electrics are known to still remain, with most being brougham-bodied models.

Surviving Milburn Light Electrics are exhibited or otherwise held in the collections of the following museums:

- Allen County Museum (1923 Model 27L Brougham)
- Antique Car Museum of Iowa (1922 Model 27L Brougham)
- Autoseum (Note: loaned from National Museum of Science and Technology, Sweden), Sweden (1919 Model 27L Brougham)
- Boyertown Museum of Historic Vehicles (1917 Model 27 Brougham; 1919 Model 27L Brougham)
- Egeskov Castle (Note: not owned by museum, but displayed there) (1920 Model 27L Brougham)
- Ellwood House and Museum (1920 Model 27L Brougham)
- The History Museum, South Bend, Indiana (Brougham)
- Josiah K. Lilly III Antique Automobile Museum at Heritage Museums and Gardens (1917 Model 27 Brougham)
- Kamyshmash Automobtive Museum, Moscow (1922 Model 27L Brougham)
- Museo Automovilistico de Malaga, Spain (1916 Model 22 Brougham)
- Museum of Science and Industry, (Note: donated to museum in 1933 by its original owner, Amos Alonzo Stagg) Chicago (1921 Model 27L Brougham)
- Norwegian Museum of Science and Technology (1917 Model 27 Brougham)
- State Historical Society of Iowa (1917 Model 27 Brougham)
- Tampa Bay Automobile Museum (1922 Model 27L Brougham)
- Elizabeth M. Watkins Community Museum (1921 Model 27L Brougham)
