= Karl Probst =

American automotive pioneer (1883–1963)

- Born: October 20, 1883; Point Pleasant, West Virginia
- Died: August 25, 1963 (aged 79); Dayton, Ohio
- Children: Jean "Jack", Charles
- Parent(s): Charles and Eva (Knight) Probst
- Engineering career
- Discipline: Engineering
- Projects: Bantam Automobile Company
- Significant design: Bantam Jeep

Karl Probst (October 20, 1883 – August 25, 1963) was an American freelance engineer and automotive pioneer, credited with drafting the design drawings of the first prototype of the Bantam Reconnaissance Car, also known as the World War II "jeep" in 1940.

== Biography ==
He was born in Point Pleasant, West Virginia, to Charles and Eva (Knight) Probst. He studied engineering at Ohio State University and graduated in 1906.

Early automobile design work by Probst included the design of the original Milburn Light Electric.

Probst was recruited by American Bantam Car Company in 1940 to help it win a contract to provide the U.S. Army with a lightweight reconnaissance vehicle that could transport troops and equipment across rugged terrain. Bantam had provided the specifications to the Army, and Probst drafted the design for the Jeep in two days, commencing on June 17, 1940, Bantam's first hand-built prototype was complete and running by September 21, 1940, just meeting the forty-nine-day deadline and was delivered to the Army Quartermaster Corps for testing at Camp Holabird, MD.

He died in Dayton, Ohio, on August 25, 1963.

== Legacy ==
The Port Authority of Allegheny County pays homage to Karl Probst by putting his name on one or more of the city buses.

Around 1990, a crescent-shaped street in Caen (France) was named after Karl Probst, both extremities of which open on another street named after Commodore John Hughes-Hallett, in a district close to the Mémorial pour la Paix museum, where a majority of streets commemorate personalities linked with the Second World War, the Résistance, and the subsequent making of the European Community.
