= Ford Pygmy =

US 1/4-ton prototype military vehicle

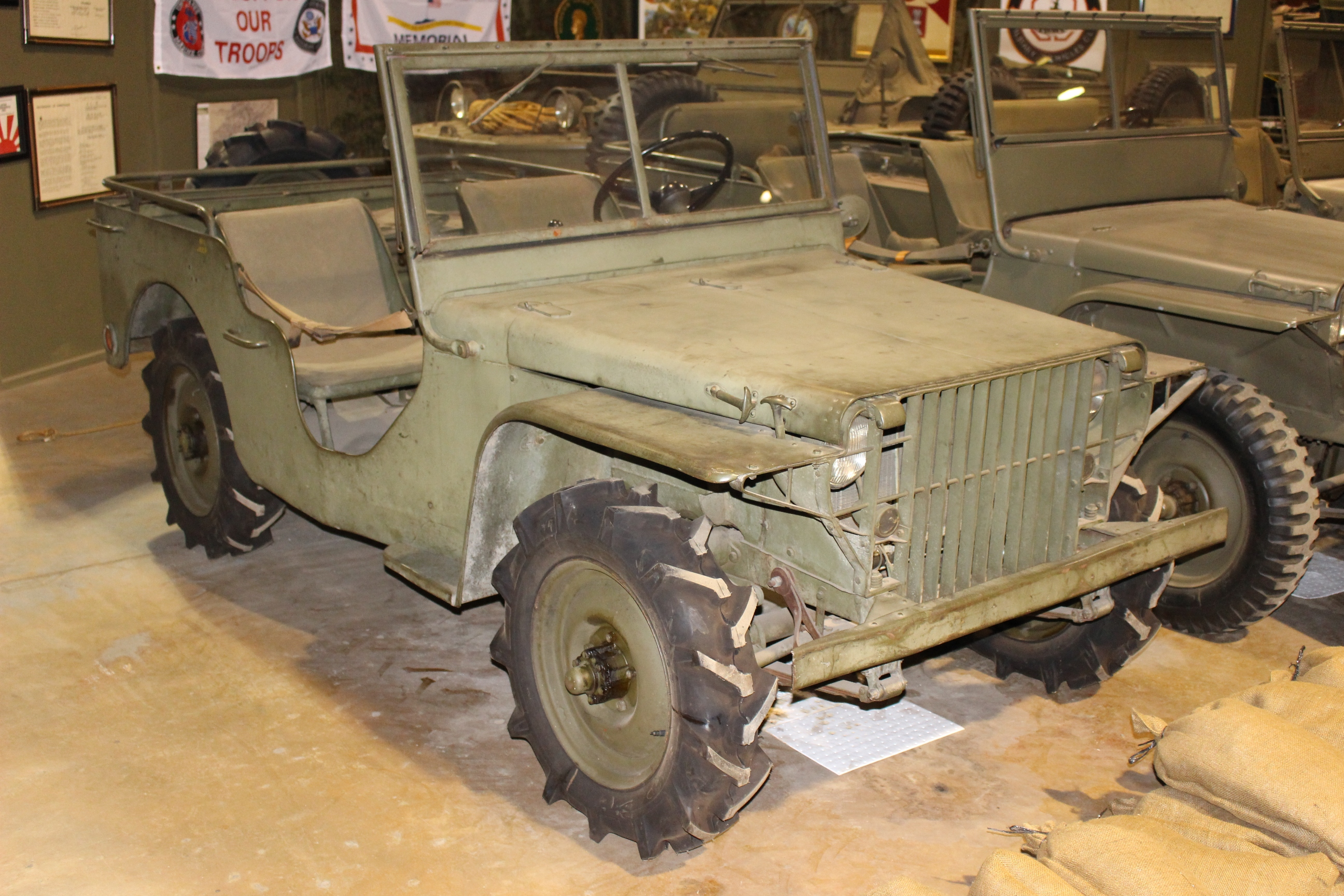
- Ford Pygmy at U.S. Veterans Memorial Museum
- Type: 1/4 ton (227kg) (Note: Off-road payload rating.) 4×4 utility truck
- Place of origin: United States

Production history
- Manufacturer: Ford
- Produced: 23 November 1940
- No. built: 1

Specifications (Pygmy)
- Mass: 2,100 lb (950 kg) road
- Length: 133 in (3.38 m)
- Width: 59 in (1.50 m) overall
- Height: 59 in (1.50 m)
- Crew: 3
- Engine: 119.5 CID, 4 cyl, side valve (Fordson Model N tractor engine); 45 bhp (34 kW) @ 3,600 rpm 84 lb⋅ft (114 N⋅m) @ 1,500 rpm
- Suspension: Beam axles on leaf springs

The Ford Pygmy is one of two pilot vehicles submitted by Ford in response to the U.S. Army's requirement for a "light reconnaissance and command car" during the military build-up before World War II, which later became better known as the World War II jeep.

The Pygmy is the oldest known survivor of the original 1/4-ton pilot vehicles tested by the Army, delivered to them six days before the oldest surviving competitor.

== History ==
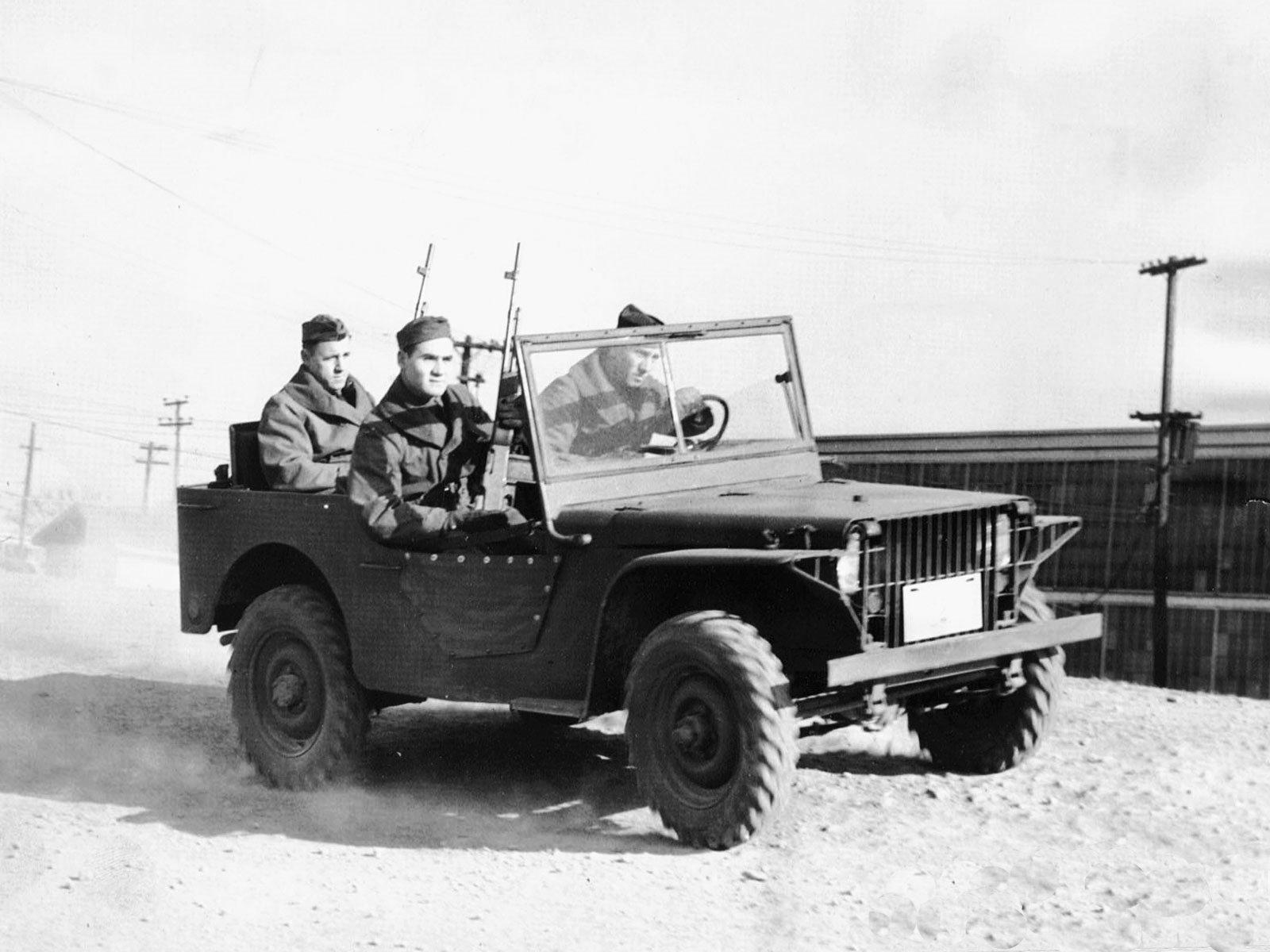
Ford Pygmy during testing at Camp Holabird, Maryland

American Bantam was the first to deliver a pilot vehicle to the Army on 23 September 1940. Willys-Overland followed with its Quad on 13 November. On 23 November, Ford delivered two pilot vehicles to Camp Holabird, Maryland for testing: the Pygmy and a second vehicle with a body built by the Budd Company. The Budd-bodied vehicle more closely resembled the Bantam pilot and was not tested by the Army. Both the Willys and Ford vehicles were heavily based on the Bantam Pilot design.

The Pygmy was hand-built in the Ford development shop in Dearborn, Michigan using parts from Ford's commercial and agricultural lines. It was the first of the pilot vehicles to feature a flat grill with headlamps positioned behind it for protection, an intermediate bow for the canvas top, its fuel tank mounted inside the body under the driver's seat, and a two‐piece opening/folding windshield with a round tubing frame. Another innovation was headlamps positioned on hinged brackets which allowed them to be pivoted to illuminate the engine compartment at night. All of these design features were ultimately incorporated into the standard World War II jeep, the Willys MB.

The pilot vehicles were the property of the manufacturer and after testing was complete, the army returned them. The Pygmy was donated to the Henry Ford Museum by Henry Ford II in 1948. It was acquired at auction by a private collector in 1982, and is now in the collection of the U.S. Veterans Memorial Museum in Huntsville, Alabama where it is preserved in virtually original un-restored condition.

Ford Pygmy Accession Sheet

The second Ford pilot was discovered in 1998 derelict in a field in California. It was obtained by a private collector in the United Kingdom and has been restored. Neither the original Bantam Pilot nor the Willys Quad is known to have survived. The oldest (and only) known surviving Bantam BRC‐60, serial number 1007, belongs to the Smithsonian Institution and is currently displayed at the Heinz History Center in Pittsburgh, Pennsylvania. It was delivered to the Army on 29 November 1940, six days after the Pygmy arrived at Camp Holabird for testing.

== Gallery ==
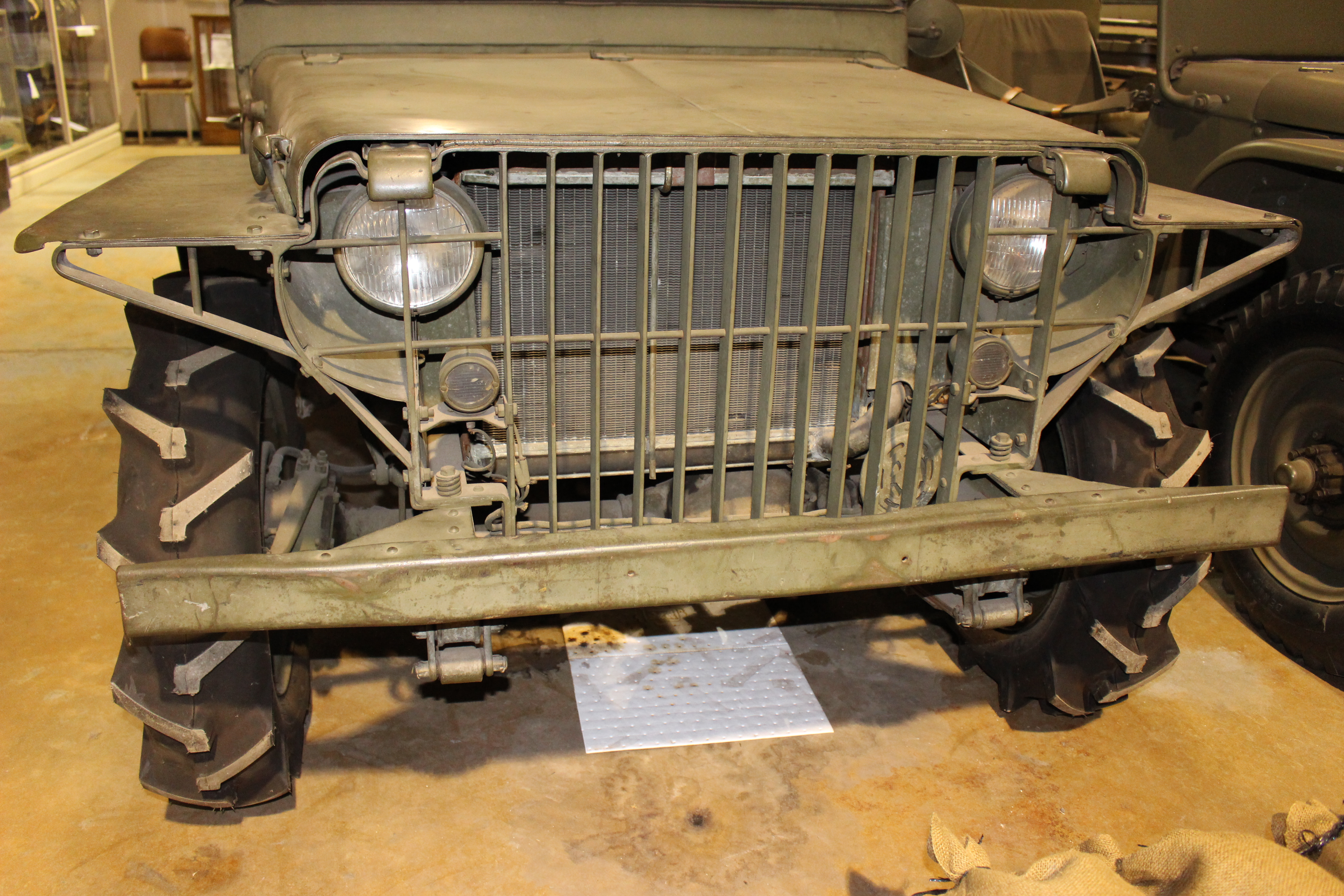
Flat grill and recessed headlights

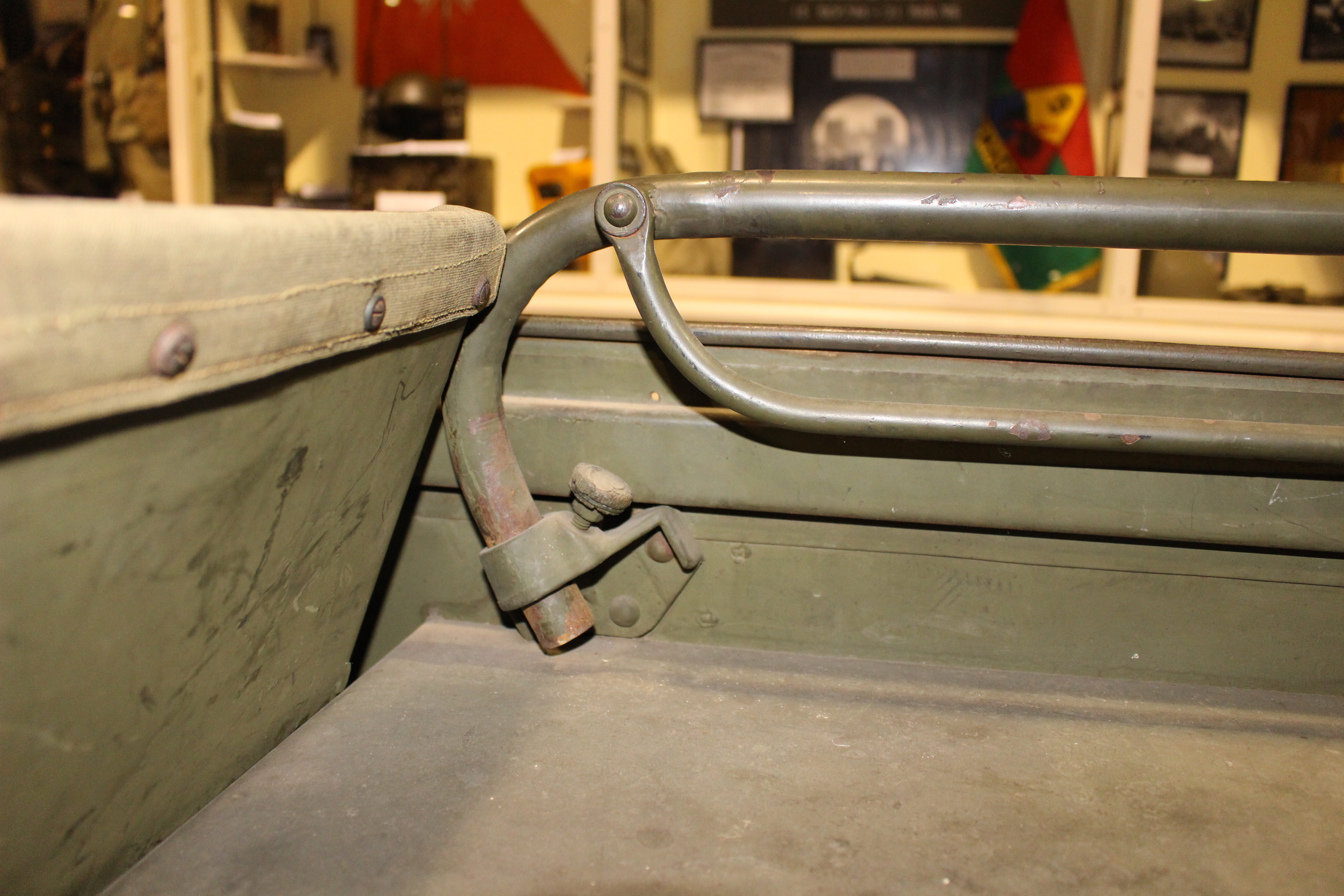
Intermediate top bow

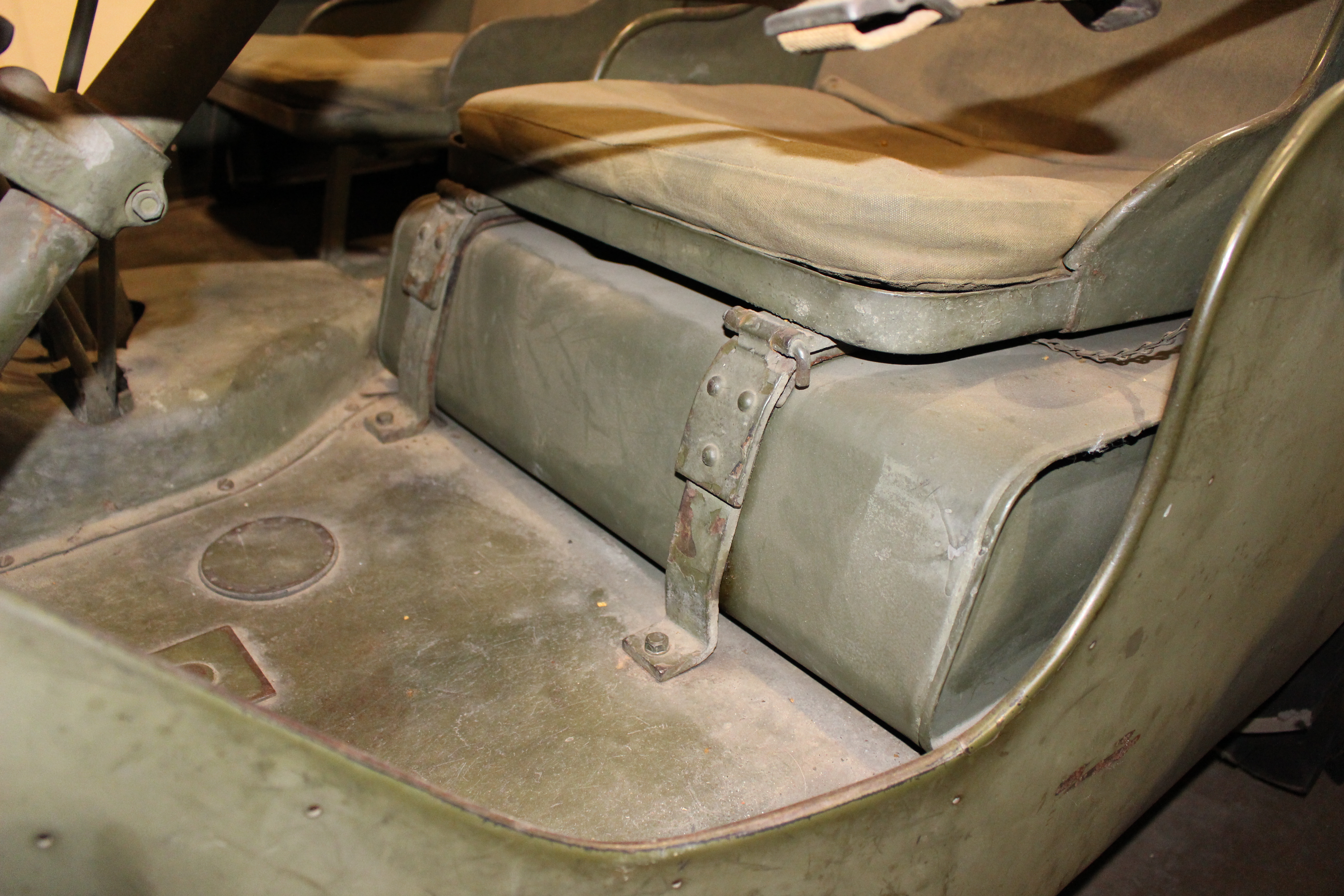
Fuel tank positioned under driver seat, inside tub

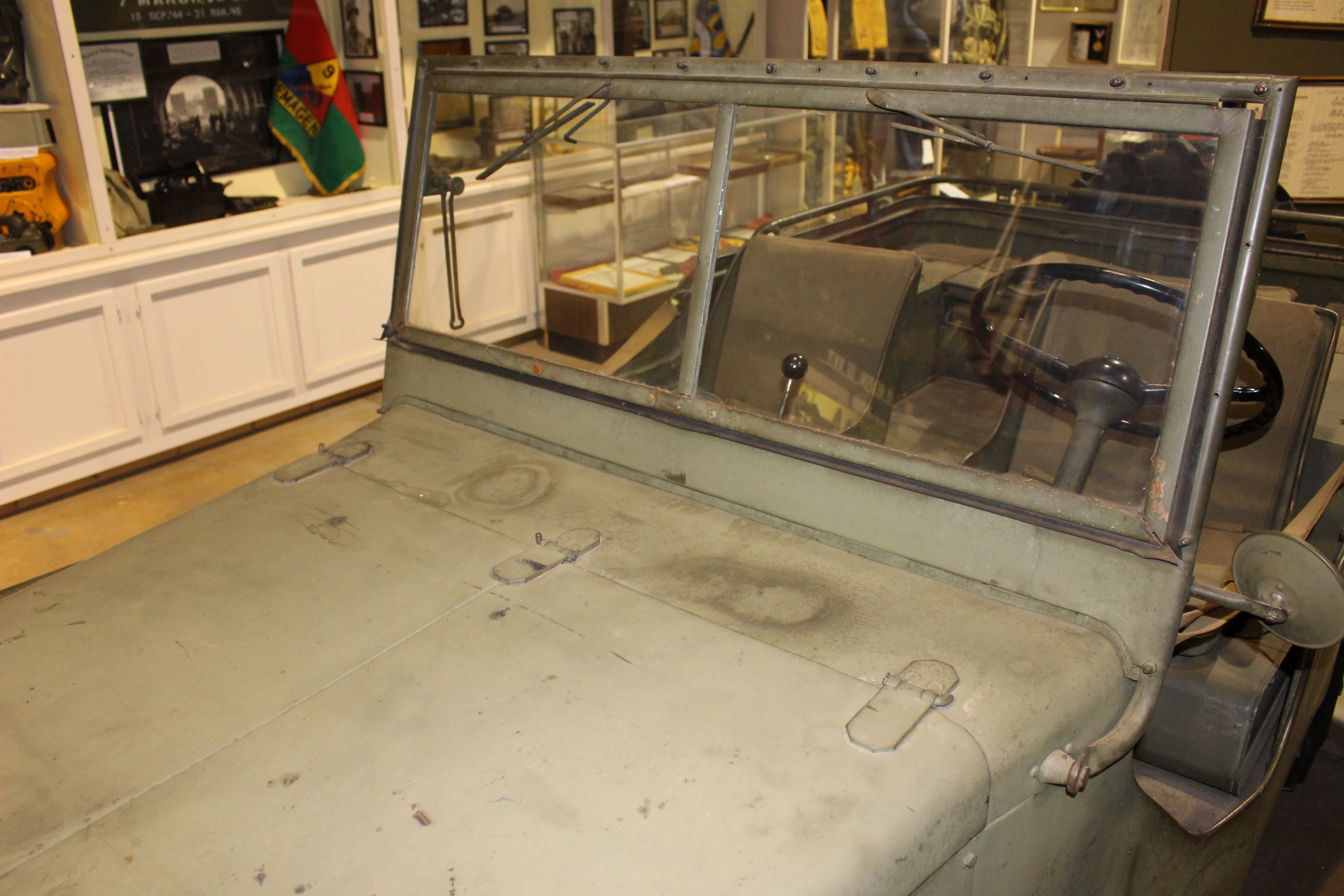
Two-piece opening/folding Windshield

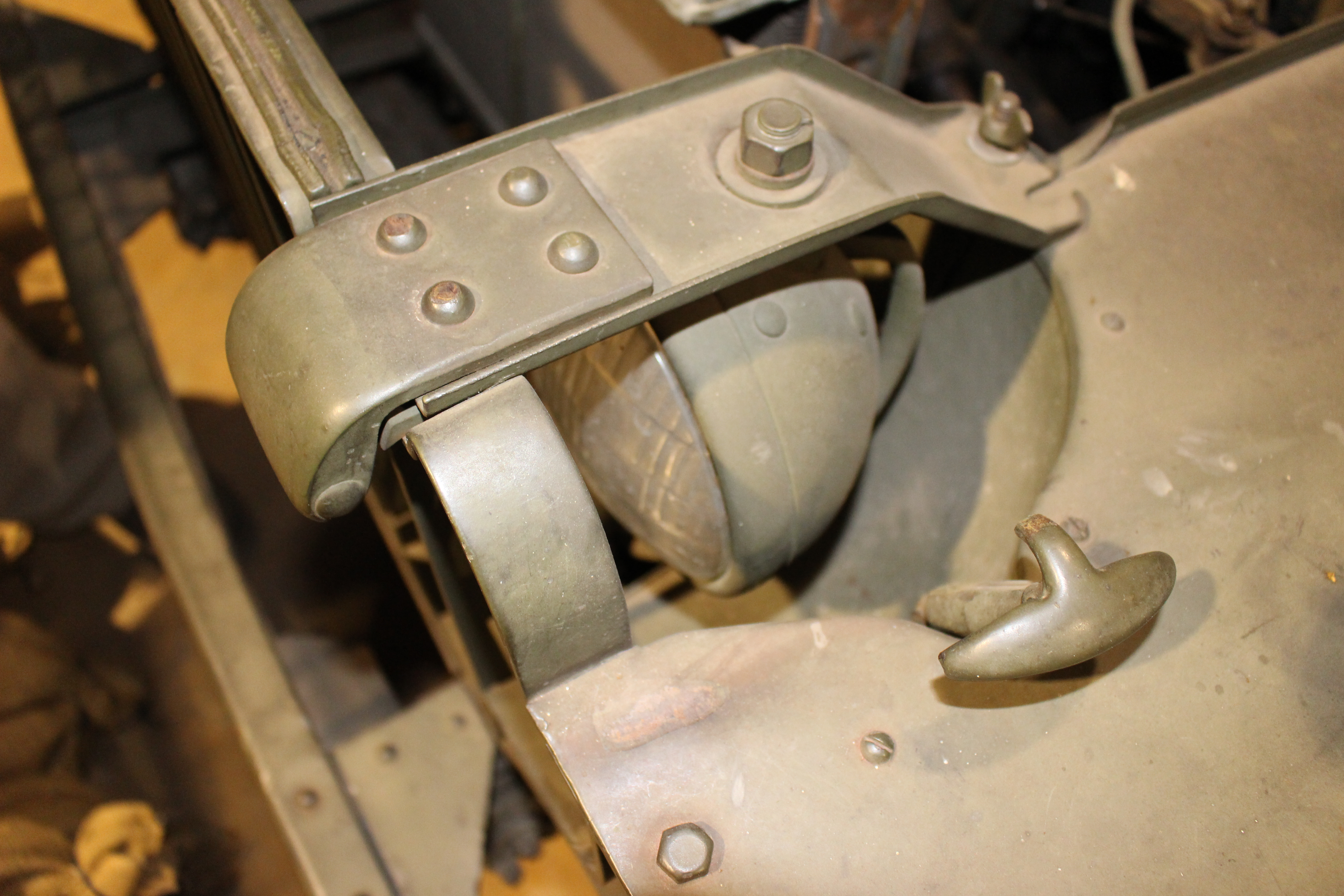
Hinged headlight bracket
