= Alexis de Sakhnoffsky =

Industrial designer

- Born: Алексей Владимирович Сахновский; November 12, 1901; Kiev, Russian Empire (now Kyiv, Ukraine)
- Died: April 27, 1964 (aged 62); Atlanta, Georgia, U.S.
- Occupation: Automotive designer

Alexis de Sakhnoffsky (November 12, 1901 – April 27, 1964, born Алексей Владимирович Сахновский) was an American industrial designer, known principally for his Streamline-style automotive designs.

Sakhnoffsky was born in Kiev, Russian Empire. He was the son of physician and Active State Councillor Vladimir Sakhnoffsky (Sakhnovsky; 1855–1917). Sakhnoffsky's mother was the daughter of Nikola Tereshchenko, a millionaire and sugar industrialist.

In 1919, Sakhnoffsky joined the anti-Bolshevik Volunteer Army. In early 1920 after the Bolshevik revolution, he emigrated from his motherland. At first he lived in Paris, where his mother's aunt lived. Then he emigrated to Switzerland, and by the 1920s had become a well-known designer of European sports cars.

He relocated to North America in 1929 and was employed by the Hayes Body Corporation where he did design work for several Hayes customers, including Auburn, Cord, and American Austin automobiles. The 1929 Cord L-29 he designed for himself (and which was built at Hayes) won the Grand Prize at the 1929 Monaco Concours d'Elegance and the Grand Prix d'Honneur at the 1929 Beaulieu Concours. He went to Packard in the early 1930s, and although he did not stay there for long he helped set the company's design direction for the next several years. Sakhnoffsky later did work for White trucks, among others.

In the early 1950s, Sakhnoffsky teamed up with Preston Tucker (after Tucker's tumultuous acquittal from an SEC trial over the Tucker 48 sedan) on a project funded by investors from Brazil. They began initial designs to build a sports car called the Tucker Carioca. But Sakhnoffsky's travels to Brazil were plagued by fatigue and upon his return to the United States he was diagnosed with lung cancer. He died from pneumonia as a complication of lung cancer in Atlanta, Georgia. The Tucker Carioca was never developed.

Sakhnoffsky also completed numerous other design projects including bicycles, kitchen items, and furniture. Additionally, he served as a technical editor for Esquire magazine from 1934 until the 1960s.
