= American Austin Car Company =

American automobile manufacturer

- Industry: Automobile
- Founded: 23 Feb 1929
- Defunct: 1935
- Fate: Liquidated
- Successor: American Bantam Car Company
- Headquarters: Butler, Pennsylvania,
- Key people: Reuben O. Gill
- Products: Vehicles
- Parent: Austin Motor Company (United Kingdom)

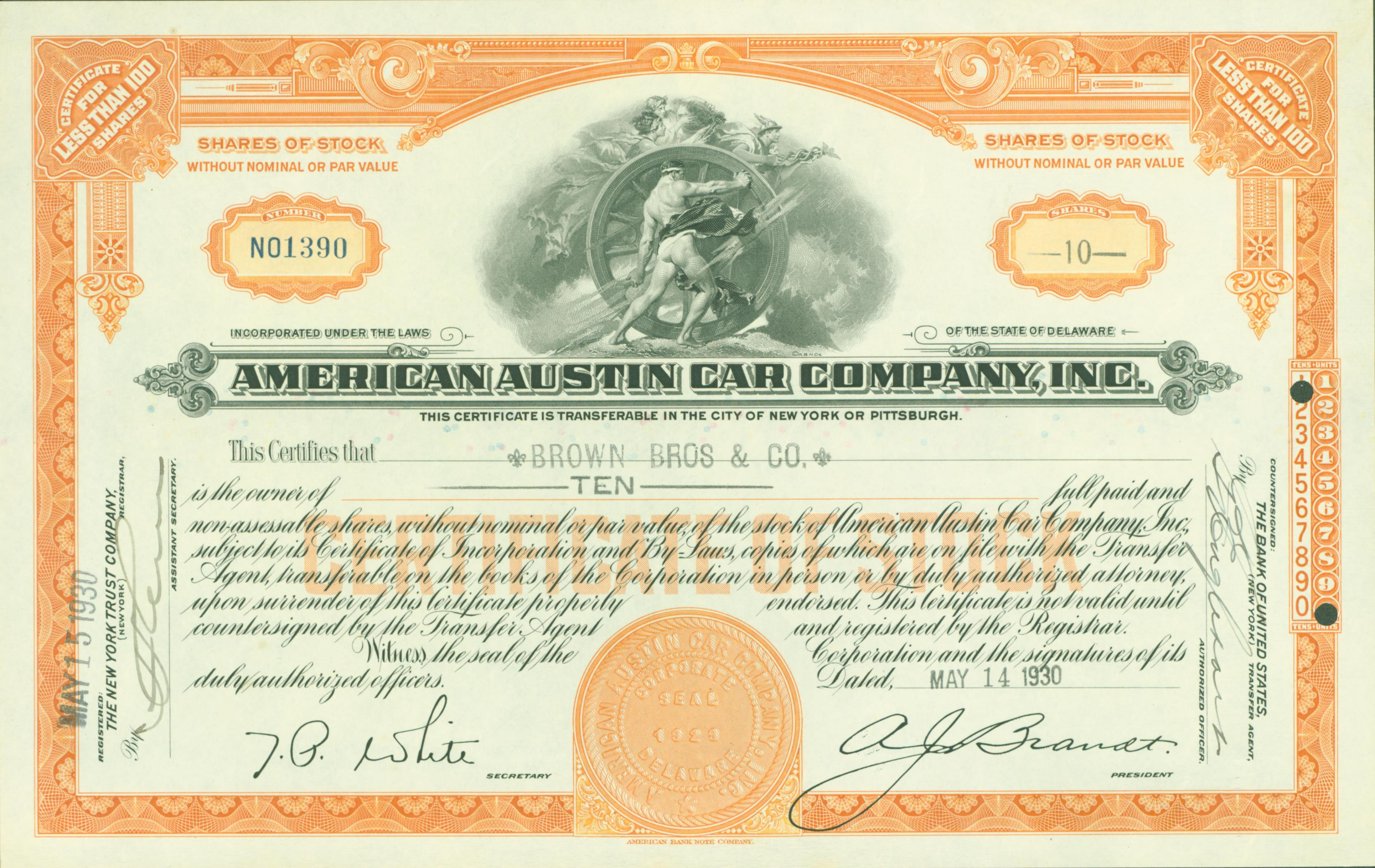
Share of the American Austin Car Company, issued 14 May 1930

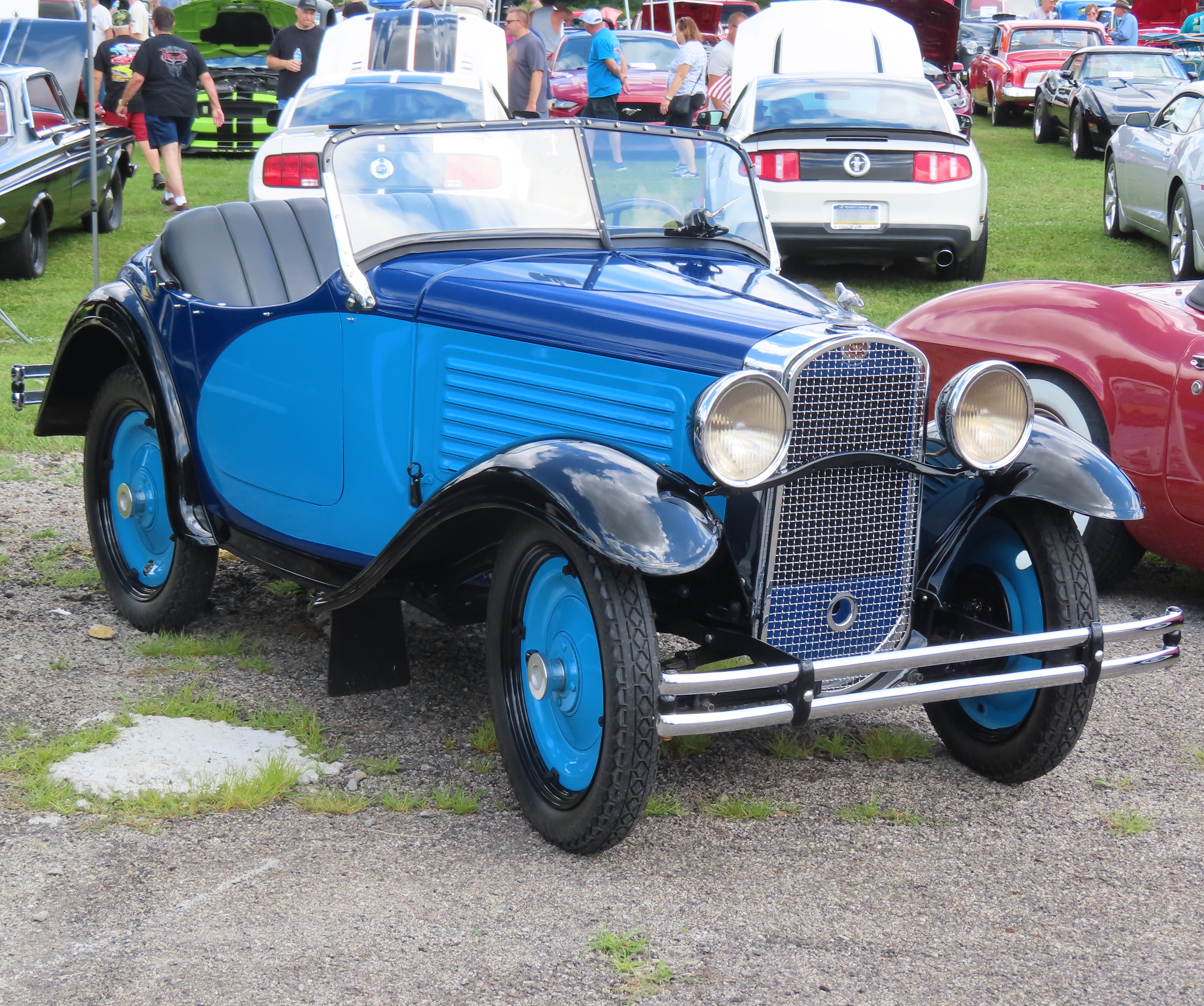
1931 American Austin roadster

The American Austin Car Company Inc. was an American automobile manufacturing corporation incorporated in the state of Delaware. The company was founded on February 23, 1929, and produced motorcars licensed from the British Austin Motor Company from 1930 through 1934, after it had filed for bankruptcy protection. The company was liquidated in 1935 and the assets were acquired by Evans Operations, Inc. and a new company American Bantam Car Company was incorporated in June 1936.

== History ==
American Austin Car Company set up manufacturing operations in Butler, Pennsylvania, in premises that had belonged to the Standard Steel Car Company. Their intention was to assemble and sell in the United States a version of the Austin 7 car, called American Austin. After some initial success the Great Depression set in, and sales fell off to the point that production was suspended. In 1934 the company filed for bankruptcy protection and in 1935 the company was liquidated.

The Austin automobile was designed in the hopes of creating a market for small-car enthusiasts in the United States. The cars had 747 cc (45.6 cu in) inline-four engines, enabling the car to return 40 mpg_{‑US} (48 mpg_{‑imp}; 5.9 L/100 km), and travel 1,000 miles or 1,600 kilometres per 2 US qt (1.7 imp qt; 1.9 L) fill of oil. It was capable of 50 mph (80 km/h) in high gear. Styling resembled small Chevrolets, with Stutz- and Marmon-style horizontal hood louvres. The bodies were designed by Alexis de Sakhnoffsky and made by the Hayes Body Company of Detroit. The coupe was billed as a sedan, and sold for $445, slightly less than a Ford V8 roadster. The Great Depression made the cheaper secondhand cars more appealing, so sales dropped off.

American Austin produced 8,448 cars were sold during 1930, the company's first (and best) year of sales but only 1,279 vehicles were built in 1931. Sales fell off to the point that production was suspended in the spring of 1932. American Austin was reorganized, and Reuben O. Gill was appointed as president and general manager. Gill established a relationship with Roy Evans, owner of a large chain of dealerships in the southeast United States. By August production rose to an average of 600 vehicles per month with 3,846 cars being manufactured in 1932, with 80% of the cars sold to Evans. In 1933 American Austin domestic sales topped out at 4,726 units, still far short of the "180,000 firm orders" American Austin was supposed to have in 1929, before the crash.

In 1934, running out of inventory for metal stamped body parts, American Austin started to produce small scale pickup trucks, making the bodies now in-house. But production slowed down and during the summer American Austin filed a petition in federal court to plan for reorganization. Production of vehicles finally stopped on December 1, 1934. By the end of 1934 about 20,000 American Austin cars had been produced.

On July 19, 1934 American Austin was ordered to show cause why an order for its liquidation should not be granted. The following week the federal court ordered the liquidation of American Austin and appointed Gill as trustee. When Evans heard that American Austin was about to be auctioned off, he quickly sent his good friend and lawyer Bill Ward Jr. to Butler to see if he might negotiate a favorable acquisition. Ward negotiated a deal to acquire the American Austin land, buildings, equipment and inventory for $5,000 cash in addition to assuming $214,099.83 in debt. On August 21, 1935, the liquidating trustee sold the assets of Austin to Roy S. Evans, Martin Tow and William A. Ward, Jr.

The day Evans' bid was accepted, a company called Industrial Improvement Company, of Indianapolis, Indiana, filed a bill of equity to block the sale of American Austin assets to Evans' syndicate. Industrial Improvement had made a competing bid, increasing the total offer by $5,000, but their bid had been rejected. When the presiding judge learned that 80% of the creditors supported Roy Evans' acquisition and had authorized the court to accept only Evans' bid he threw out the challenge and the sale of American Austin's assets was final.

A month after the sale of the assets, the factory was back in operation, now owned by Evans' syndicate and doing business as Evans Operations, Inc.

Beginning in the 1960s, the car gained a following with hot rodders, as well as among drag racers. The 75 in (1,900 mm) wheelbase made it attractive, even compared to the Anglia.

== Gallery ==
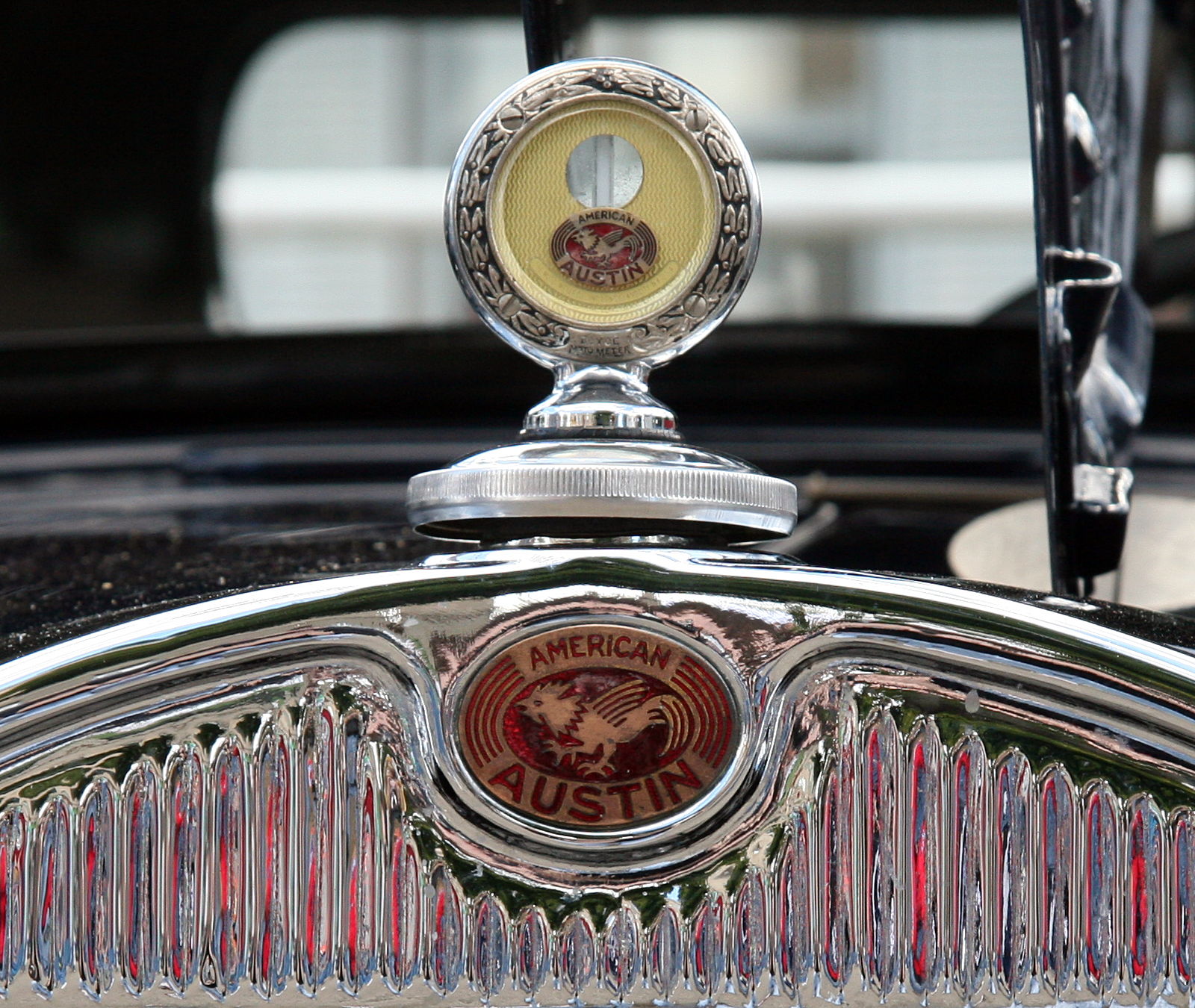
An American Austin hood ornament
