= M5 half-track =

US Military Vehicle

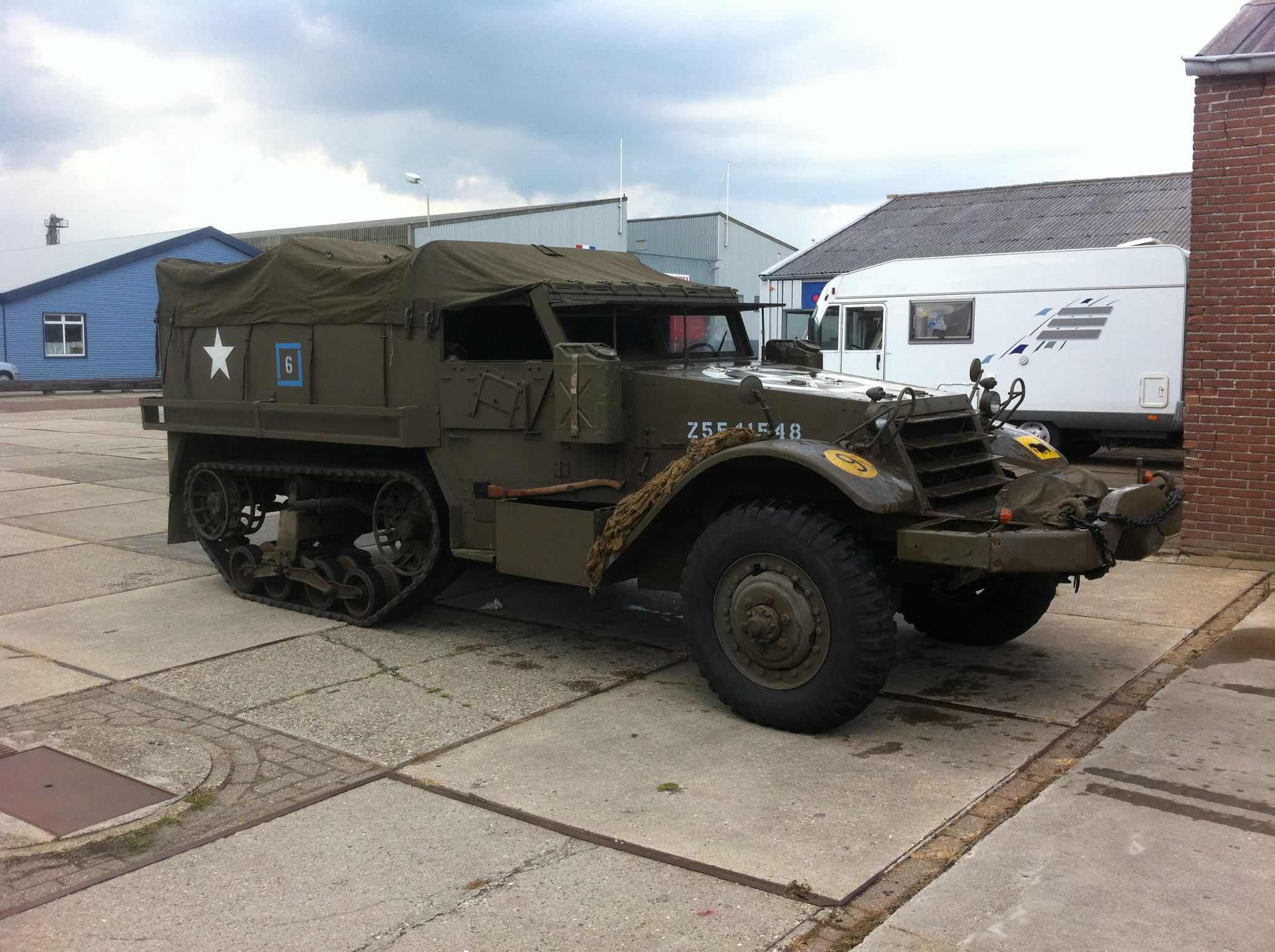
- A preserved M5 half-track
- Type: Half-track armored personnel carrier
- Place of origin: United States

Service history
- In service: 1943 to early-1990s
- Used by: See list of operators
- Wars: World War II; First Indochina War; 1948 Arab-Israeli war; Korean War; Suez Crisis; Six-Day War; Yom Kippur War; 1982 Lebanon War

Production history
- Designer: Ordnance Department
- Designed: 1942
- Manufacturer: International Harvester
- Produced: 1942–1943
- No. built: 7484 (not including M9 or anti-aircraft variants)

Specifications
- Mass: 18,900 lb (8.6 t) (M5), 19,050 lb (8.64 t) (M5A1) loaded
- Length: 20.8 ft (6.3 m)
- Width: 7.3 feet (2.23 m)
- Height: 9 feet (2.74 m) overall
- Crew: 3+10 troops
- Armor: 7.9–15.8 mm (0.31–0.62 in)
- Main armament: 1 × 0.5 in (13 mm) M2 machine gun
- Secondary armament: 2 × 0.3 in (7.6 mm) M1919 machine gun
- Engine: IHC RED-450-B, 451 in^{3} (7,390 cc), 6-cylinder, compression ratio 6.35:1; 142 hp (106 kW)
- Transmission: Constant mesh
- Suspension: Semi-elliptical longitudinal leaf springs (wheels); Vertical volute spring suspension (rear)
- Fuel capacity: 60 US gal (230 L)
- Operational range: 220 mi (350 km)
- Maximum speed: 42 mph (68 km/h)

The M5 half-track (officially the Carrier, Personnel, Half-track, M5) was an American armored personnel carrier in use during World War II. It was developed in 1942 when existing manufacturers of the M2 half-track car, and M3 half-track could not keep up with production demand. International Harvester (IH) had capacity to produce a similar vehicle to the M3, but some differences from the M3 had to be accepted due to different production equipment. IH produced the M5 from December 1942 to October 1943.

Using the same chassis as their M5, IH could produce an equivalent to the M2, which was the M9 half-track. There were also variants of the M13 and M16 MGMCs based on the M5. The M13 and M16 were exported to the United Kingdom and to Soviet Union respectively. The M5 was supplied to Allied nations (the British Commonwealth, France, and the Soviet Union) under Lend-Lease. After WWII, the M5 was leased to many NATO countries. The Israel Defense Forces used it in several wars and developed it into the M3 Mark A and the M3 Mark B.

== Specifications ==
The specifications of the M5 were almost identical to the specifications of the M3 half-track. It was 20.8 feet (6.3 m) long, 7.3 feet (2.23 m) wide, 9 feet (2.74 m) high, and had a gross weight of either 18,900 lb (8.6 t) (M5) or 19,050 lb (8.64 t) (M5A1). It had vertical volute springs for the tracks and semi-elliptical longitudinal leaf springs for the wheels. It was powered by a 142 hp (106 kW) IHC RED-450-B, 451 cubic inch (7,390 cc), 6-cylinder engine, with a compression ratio of 6.35:1. It had a fuel capacity of 60 US gallons (230 L), a range of 220 miles (350 km), and a speed of 42 miles per hour (68 km/h). It had constant mesh transmission, 6.5–13.5 mm (0.26–0.53 in) of armor, one 0.5 in (12.7 mm) M2 machine gun and two 0.3 in (7.6 mm) M1919 machine guns, and crew of three with up to ten passengers. The track was an endless rubber-band track which was made of molded rubber over steel cabling with metal track guides.

== Development ==
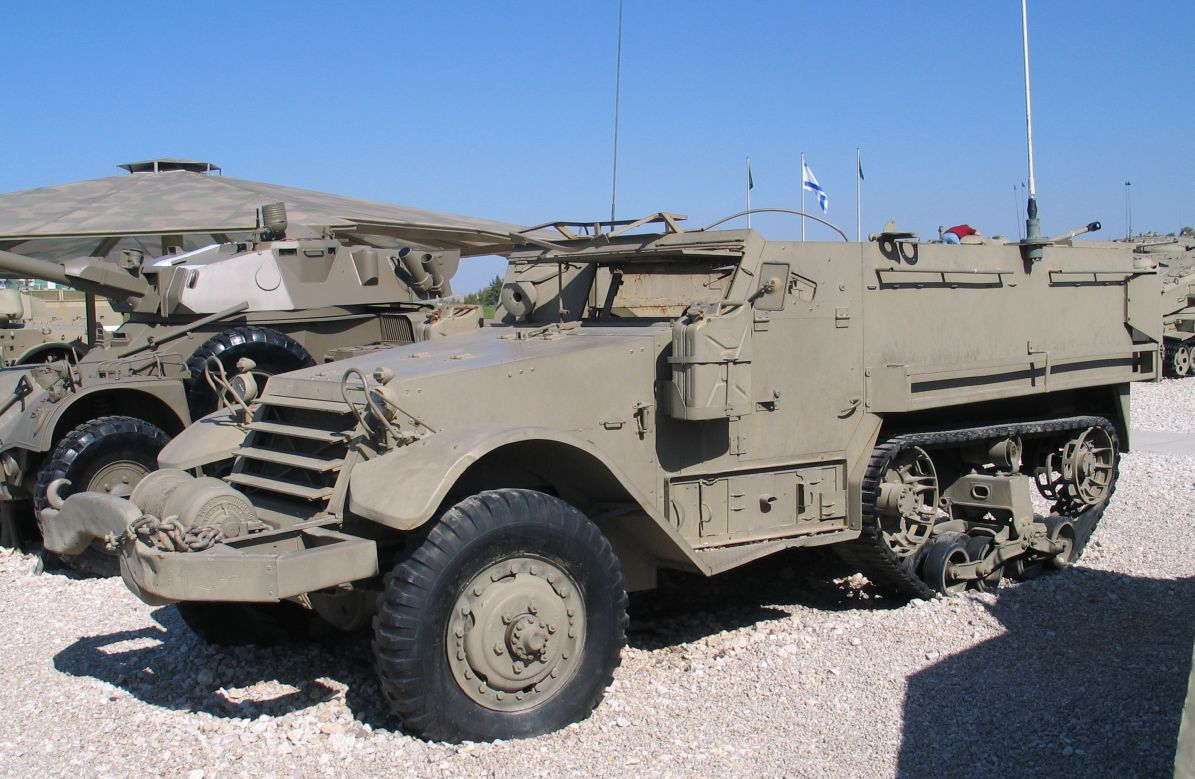
An M5 half-track at the Yad La-Shiryon Museum in Israel

After the attack on Pearl Harbor, the demand for U.S. produced armored vehicles grew and the existing production capacity was stretched by the need to equip the expanding U.S. military as well as its allies. As a result, the war munitions industry in the U.S. rapidly expanded. While the existing manufacturers of M3 half-tracks could not meet the increased demands, International Harvester (IH) could build them, but changes in components and construction were necessary. Prototype vehicles were provided designated as the M3E2 and the M2E5. After testing by General Motors, they were accepted for production under the designations M5 and M9 respectively.

Due to a lack of face-hardened armor, homogeneous armor was used instead. Although thicker at 5/16 inch (7.9 mm) to the M3's 1/4 inch (6.4 mm), it was effectively less protection – armor-piercing rifle-caliber bullets could penetrate it at 300 yards (270 m) rather than 200 yards (180 m) for the M3. At the same time, IH produced a version of the M2 half-track car, the M9 half-track.

== Service history ==
The first production run of the M5 was completed in December 1942. Changes to the demand for half-tracks led to reduced orders from the U.S. Army, and the M5 became "limited standard" in the U.S. military. A total of 7,484 were produced before production was stopped in October 1943. Almost all M5s were sent to U.S. allies for further use. The added weight of the armor reduced the speed to 42 mph (68 km/h) and range was reduced to 125 mi (201 km). The final vehicles were completed in early October 1943.

In the UK, the Universal Carrier already fulfilled the infantry transport role and the M5 was used instead as an artillery tractor for towing the British 6-pounder and 17-pounder guns. Some were also retained in the U.S. for training purposes.

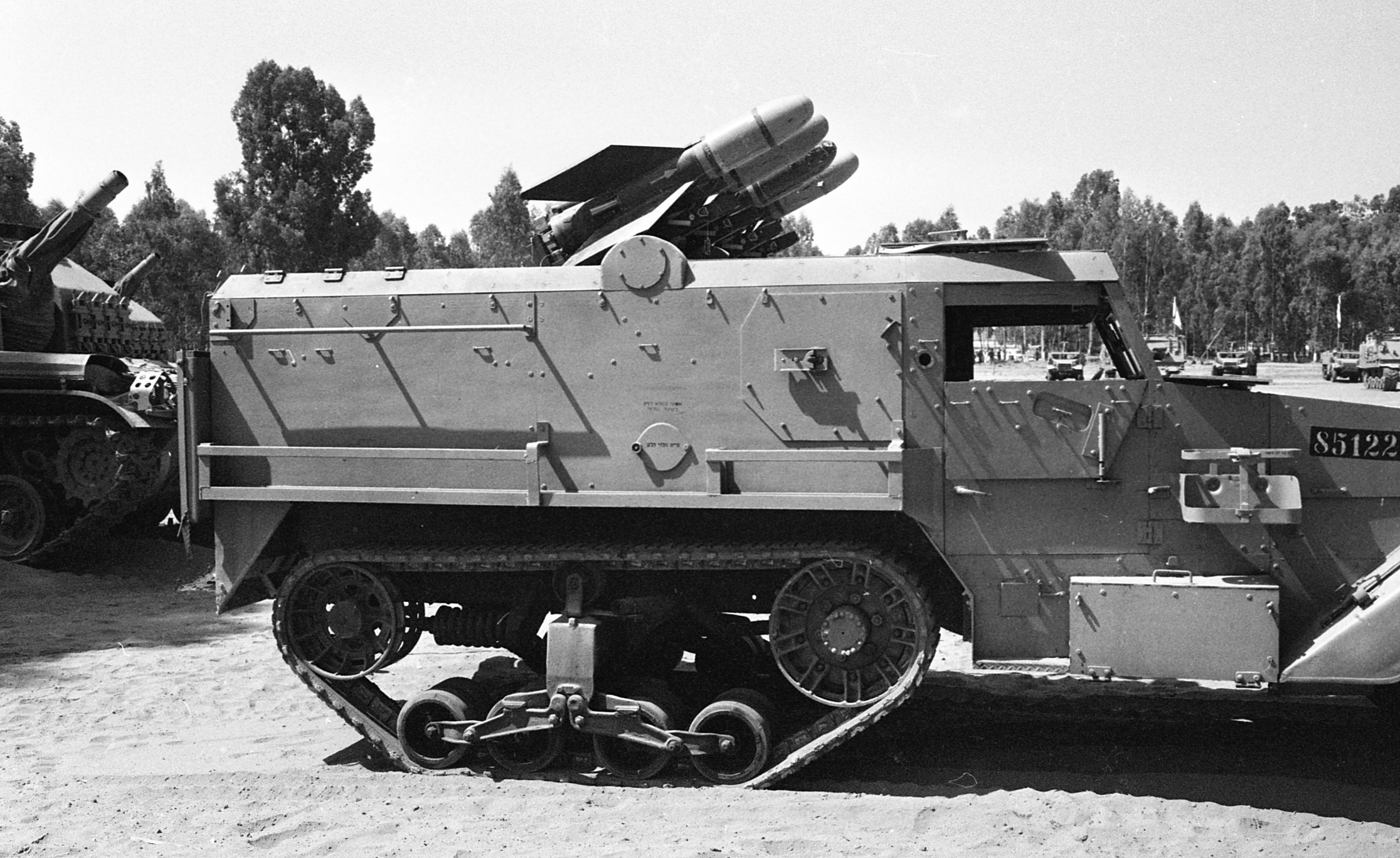
An M5 in Israeli service in 1969, modified to launch SS.11 ATGMs.

The French Far East Expeditionary Corps used M5 half-tracks during the First Indochina War.

The M5 later saw service with the Israeli army in the 1948 Arab-Israeli war. They were commonly painted red to disguise them as agricultural tractors. In 1955, the Israelis used M5s to make the M3 Mark A and the M3 Mark B. The former was an M3 or M5 with a few modifications and the latter was a M5 converted into a command carrier. Regular M5s were simply designated "M3 IHC". It was later used in the Suez Crisis and the Six-Day War. By the Yom Kippur War, the M3/M5 had been replaced by the M113 armored personnel carrier but some were still with service as command vehicle with reserve units during the 1982 Lebanon War.

== Operators ==
During the war, the majority of M5 (and M9) production went to the United Kingdom, which then passed them on to Commonwealth forces or other allies operating with the British Army, such as Free Polish or Free Czech forces. The Soviet Union received supplies directly. In British service, they were used as utility vehicles for Royal Engineers units, or to tow anti-tank guns in motor battalions instead of 15cwt trucks.

After the war, half tracks were provided under the Military Aid Program (MAP).

- Brazil – Received 20 during the war.
- Belgium – Received 20.
- Chile – Received 10.
- ROC – Loaned from the U.S. during the war
- Czechoslovakia – Loaned from Britain during the war.
- France – Received 1,196 during the war
- Israel – Acquired in 1948–49 from Europe, and directly from U.S. after 1949.
- Mali – Aid from France.
- Mexico – Received two.
- Nazi Germany – Captured from the U.S. and U.S.S.R.
- Poland – Loaned from Britain during the war.
- Soviet Union – Received 420 during World War II via Lend-Lease.
- United States – Used for training purposes only.
- United Kingdom
- Yugoslavia – 157 M5/M5A1 received during the Informbiro period

== Variants ==
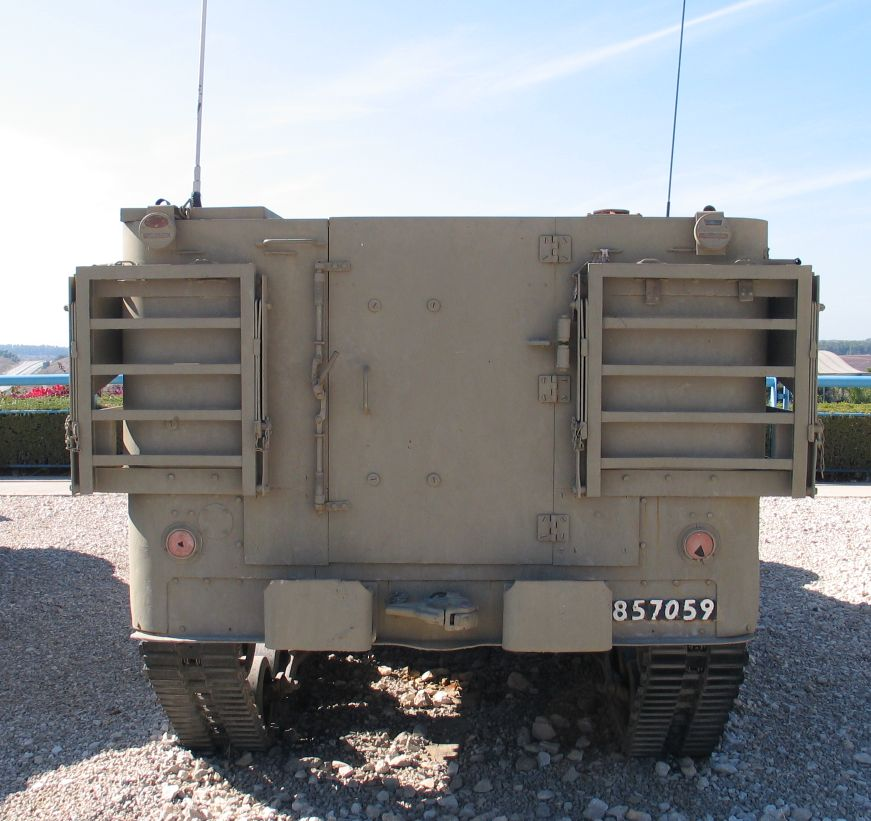
The rear portion of the M5, at an Israeli museum.

- M3E2/M5 – An IH half-track, that was virtually identical to the M3. The only differences was the thicker armor (up to 20 mm), different engine (IHC RED-450-B), and lower range (125 mi (201 km)). This model was mainly supplied to the Soviet Union, the British Commonwealth, and France. A total 4,625 were produced.
- M5A1 – M5 with a M49 machine gun mount. It could fit one 0.5 inch (12.7 mm) M2 Browning heavy machine gun, and two 0.3 inch M1919 Browning machine guns, and 2,859 were produced.
- M5A2 – Similar to the M3A2, the M5A2 was a combination of the M5 and M9 half-tracks. This was a project that was never mass-produced.
- M9 – Same as the M5, stowage arranged as the M2 half-track car, with access to radios from inside (as opposed to outside) and rear doors, plus pedestal machine gun mount, with 2,026 being produced.
- M9A1 – Same as the M9, with ring mount and three machine gun pintles, with 1,407 being produced.
- M14 half-track – A version of the M13 Multiple Gun Motor Carriage, based on the M5. It had two 0.5 in machine guns mounted in a M33 Maxson turret on the rear of the chassis. Several hundred were produced before it was replaced by the M16 MGMC and M17 MGMC, with a total 1,605 were produced.
- M17 half-track – M5 with the same quadruple 0.5 inch machine gun turret as the M16 MGMC. All 1,000 were supplied to the USSR. It saw limited use at end of World War II and was also deployed during the Korean War.
- M3 Mk. A – A modified M5. The only difference was the variety of machine guns were used in place of the M49 mount.
- M3 Mk. B – A M5 modified as a command carrier. It had extra radios and a front winch bumper.

== See also ==
- List of U.S. military vehicles by model number
