= M15 half-track =

M15 Combination Gun Motor Carriage
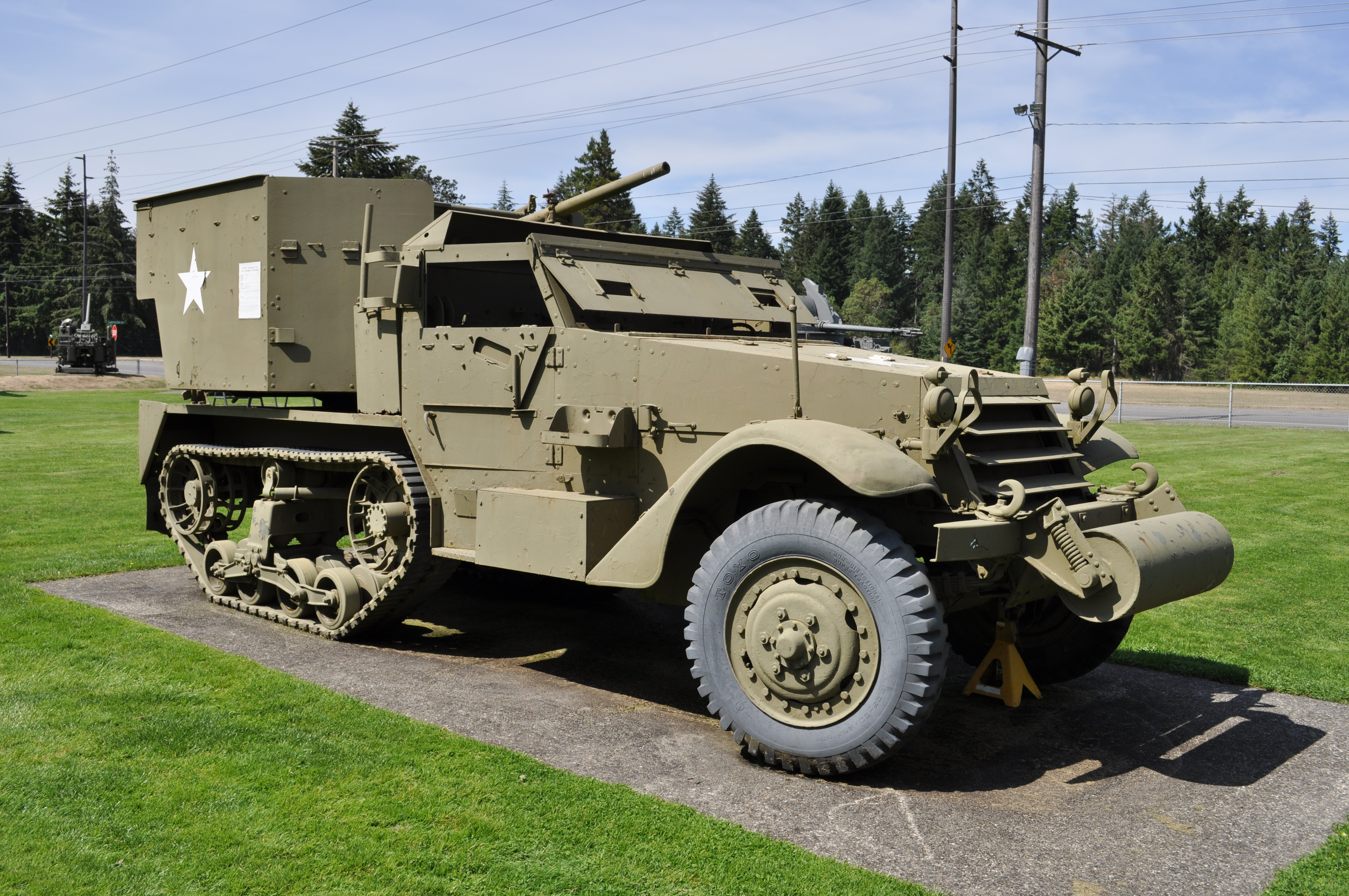
- An M15A1 CGMC displayed at the Fort Lewis Military Museum
- Type: Self-propelled anti-aircraft gun
- Place of origin: United States

Service history
- In service: 1943–53
- Used by: United States
- Wars: World War II; Korean War

Production history
- Designer: United States Army
- Designed: 1940–42
- Manufacturer: Autocar Company
- Produced: 1942–44
- No. built: 2,332

Specifications
- Mass: 10 short tons (9.1 t)
- Length: 20 ft 3 in (6.17 m)
- Width: 7 ft 4 in (2.24 m)
- Height: 7 ft 10 in (2.39 m)
- Crew: 7
- Armor: 0–12 mm (0.00–0.47 in)
- Main armament: M1 37 mm (1.5 in) gun with 2 × .50 cal (12.7 mm (0.50 in)) M2 Browning machine guns
- Engine: White 160AX, 386 in^{3} (6,330 cc) 6-cylinder, gasoline, compression ratio 6.3:1; 128 hp (95 kW)
- Power/weight: 15.8 hp/ton
- Suspension: Half-track, vertical volute springs; front leaf spring
- Fuel capacity: 60 US gal (230 L)
- Operational range: 150 mi (240 km)
- Maximum speed: 41.9 mph (67.4 km/h)

The M15 half-track, officially designated M15 Combination Gun Motor Carriage, was a self-propelled anti-aircraft gun on a half-track chassis used by the United States Army during World War II. It was equipped with one 37 millimeter (1.5 in) M1 autocannon and two water-cooled .50 caliber (12.7 mm) M2 Browning heavy machine guns. Based on the M3 half-track chassis, it was produced by the Autocar Company between July 1942 and February 1944, and served alongside the M16 Multiple Gun Motor Carriage.

The M15 evolved from the T28 project, an outgrowth of a 37 millimeter (1.5 in) gun mounted on an M2 half-track. Initially designated as the T28E1 Combination Gun Motor Carriage (CGMC), it was modified and accepted into service in 1943 as the M15. While conceived as an anti-aircraft weapon, its 37 mm gun was often used as an infantry support weapon during the later stages of World War II. The M15A1 was an improved variant with air-cooled machine guns mounted below the 37 mm gun. The M15 "Special" was an M15 armed with a single Bofors 40 mm gun.

During World War II, the vehicle served the U.S. Army throughout the Mediterranean, European, and Pacific theaters of operations. In the Korean War, the M15 served alongside the M16 providing infantry support.

== Specifications ==
The M15 was based on the M3 half-track chassis, adding a coaxially mounted armament of a fully automatic M1 37 mm (1.5 in) gun and two superior-placed .50-caliber (12.7 mm) M2 Browning machine guns. Manned by a crew of seven, it was 20 feet 3 inches (6.17 m) long, 7 feet 4 inches (2.24 m) wide, and 7 feet 10 inches (2.39 m) high, and had a wheelbase of 135.5 inches (3.44 m). The vehicle's armor was up to 12 mm thick, and the vehicle weighed 10 short tons (9.1 t). The suspension was leaf spring on the front axle and vertical volute spring for the tracks. A 386-cubic inch (6.330 cc) White 160AX, 128-horsepower (95 kW), 6-cylinder gasoline engine gave the M15 a power-to-weight ratio of 15.8 horsepower per ton and a maximum road speed of 41.9 mph (67.4 km/h). Its 60 US gal (230 L) fuel tank provided a range of 150 mi (240 km).

== Development ==
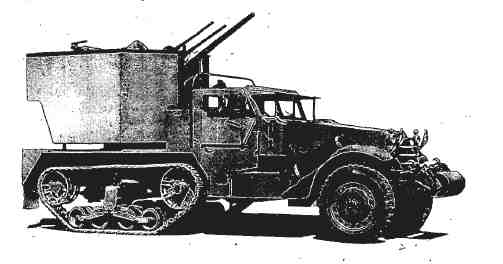
Side view of the M15 half-track

The M15 design developed from the United States Army Coast Artillery Corps' T1A2 Multiple Gun Motor Carriage (MGMC) project, which added a 37-mm gun to an M2 half-track car. It was designated the T28 and tested at the Aberdeen Proving Grounds. The tests were deemed unsuccessful due to heavy recoil, and the project was cancelled in 1942.

=== T28E1 ===
A United States Army Armored Force requirement for a mobile anti-aircraft gun to support the coming North African Campaign resulted in the T28 project being revived soon after its cancellation. The new vehicles used the larger M3 half-track chassis and an M2E1 sight for target spotting, receiving the designation T28E1 Combination Gun Motor Carriage (CGMC).

A total of eighty T28E1s were produced from July to August 1942 by White, all of which had a mount lacking protection for the gun combination and crew. After this initial run the vehicle gained an armored mount and went into production as the M15 CGMC. Some of the T28E1s still in service had their 37 mm guns removed and were converted into M3A1 half-tracks.

Gun crew of an M15 half-track defending Yontan airfield against Japanese air attack, 7 June 1945.

=== M15, M15A1, M15 "Special" ===
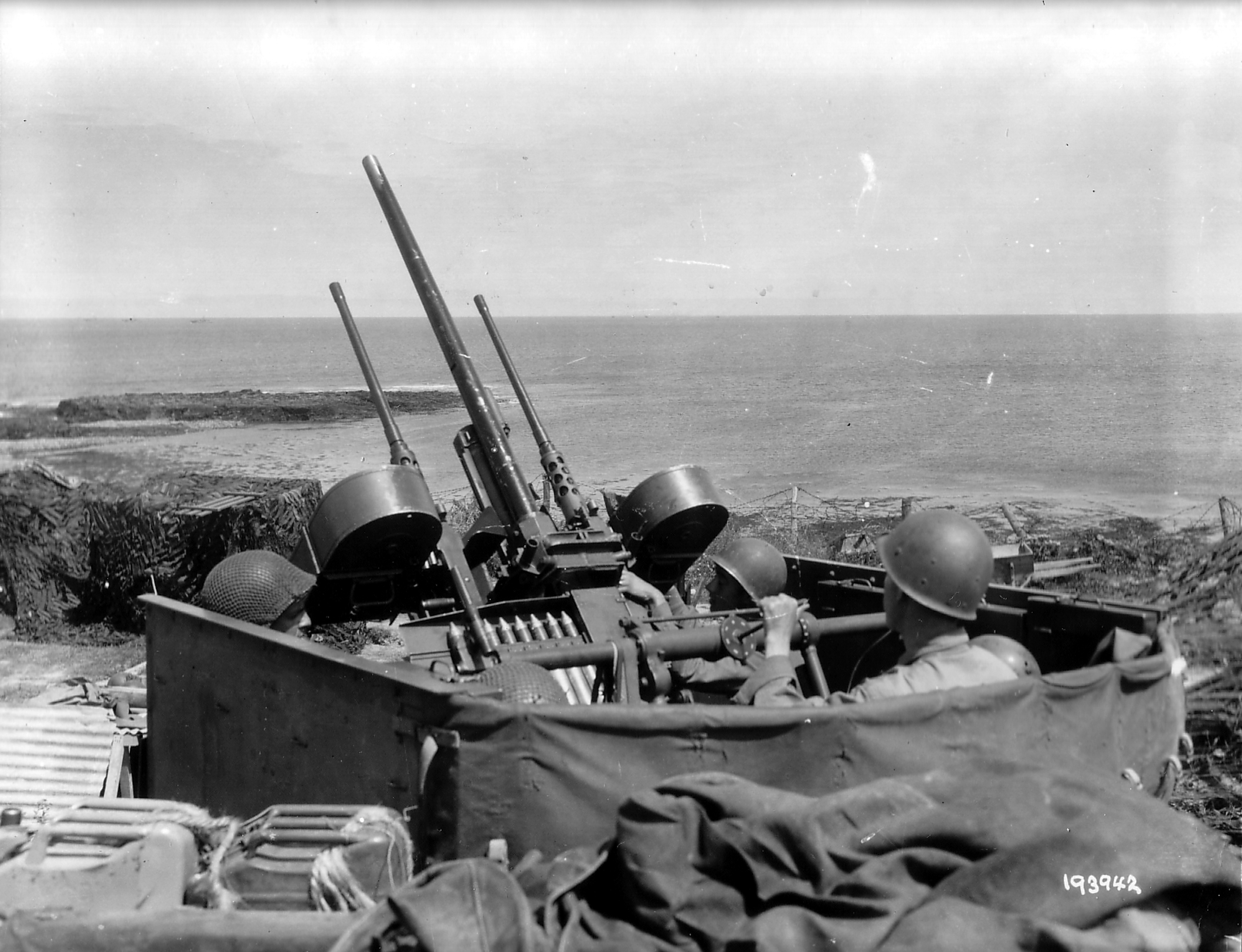
M15A1 half-track in Normandy several days after the D-day landings

The M15 was equipped with the M42 armored weapon mount, with two water-cooled coaxial M2 Browning machine guns above a 37 mm gun. A total of 680 M15s were produced in 1943 by Autocar before the considerable stress this mount placed on the M3 chassis resulted in its replacement with the M54 mount. The new mount reversed weapon placement, used simpler and lighter air-cooled M2 Brownings, and added a M6 sighting system.

The resulting combination of the M54 mount with the M3A1 half-track chassis was designated the M15A1 CGMC. A total of 1,052 were produced in 1943, and a further 600 in 1944. 100 M15s were shipped to the Soviet Union under the Lend-Lease policy. Both the M42 mount and M15 CGMC were classified as obsolete in August 1946.

The M15 "Special" was the unofficial name for an M15 (and probably other CGMCs) adapted in depots in Australia to carry only a single Bofors 40 mm gun. To enhance ground support firepower during the Korean War, depots in Japan were searched for vehicles that could be refurbished for possible combat use. A shortage of 37 mm ammunition and relative abundance of 40 mm ammunition resulted in conversion of some M15s into "T19s", later officially designated model M34.

== Service history ==
The proficiency of this mobile weapon can be attributed to three characteristics: its mobility, enabling it to work well in close support of combat troops in forward areas and to patrol roads over which heavy traffic must travel under constant threat of bombing and strafing; its flexible firepower, combining the volume of caliber .50 with the knocking power of the 37 mm; and the facility which the fire is controlled, by using the tracer stream from the caliber .50 to bring it on target before opening up with the full volume of armament. Numerous cases are cited in which a "mouse trap" effect has been obtained which enemy planes came in much closer on the initial caliber .50 fire than they would on a light cannon and were caught by the 37 mm.

— A U.S. Army report from North Africa

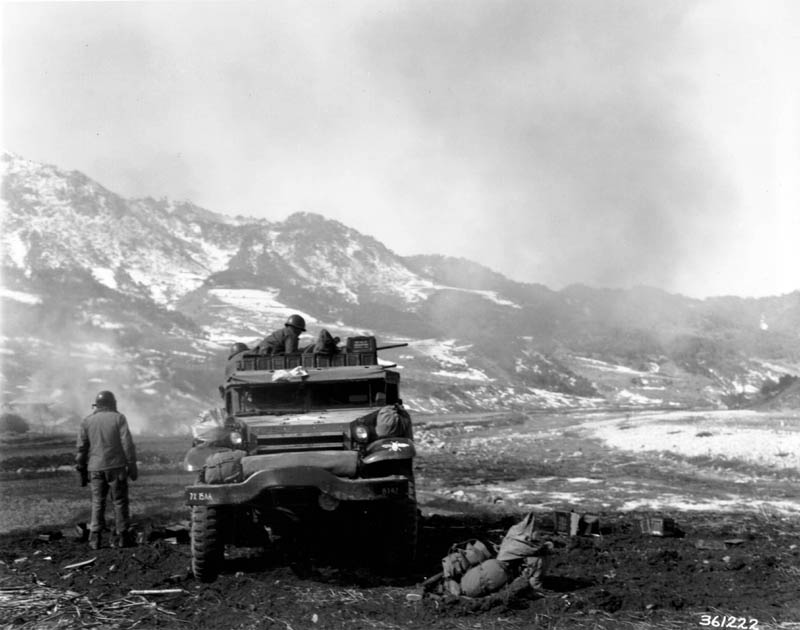
The M16 MGMC operated alongside the M15A1 in World War II and Korea, here in action during the later conflict.

The M15 was first used during Operation Torch, the November 1942 Anglo-American invasion of North Africa. Tracer ammunition from the machine guns was used to bring the main gun onto the target when engaging enemy aircraft. T28E1 crews shot down more than a hundred aircraft during Operation Torch, the Battle of Kasserine Pass, and the Allied Invasion of Sicily, shooting down thirty-nine at Kasserine alone. One T28E1 was captured at Kasserine by the Germans and rebuilt as an equipment and troop carrier to replace vehicles destroyed by Allied aircraft. During the Allied Invasion of Sicily, 78 T28E1s helped provide anti-aircraft fire for the invasion force. They were especially effective against low-flying aircraft, like Stuka dive bombers. T28E1s were used in Italy until the end of the war.

Each US Army armored division usually had the support of an attached anti-aircraft artillery automatic weapons battalion, equipped with thirty-two M15 CGMCs and thirty-two M45 Quadmount-equipped M16 MGMCs. The battalions could also be assigned to antiaircraft artillery groups at the corps and army level. After first seeing action in the Allied invasion of Italy, the M15 and M15A1 served through the rest of the Italian Campaign, the Allied invasion of Normandy, Operation Dragoon in southern France, and throughout the fighting on the Western Front. They were often used in ground support roles, as Allied air superiority left few German aircraft to engage. The vehicles were also used in the Pacific Theater during the campaign to liberate the Philippines and during the Battle of Okinawa. The M15 "Special" was used by the 209th AAA Battalion in the Philippines from 1944 to 1945.

The M15 and M15A1 served in a ground-support role during the Korean War. The M34 (instead of the M15A1, which was then classified as "limited standard") served with several AAA battalions there, including the 76th AAA Battalion and the 140th AAA Battalion. Several M15 "Specials" managed to avoid being scrapped in the post-war period and were also used, along with those converted in Japan. After World War II, many M15s were provided to Japan under the Military Aid Program (MAP). At least 20 were sent to Yugoslavia during the Informbiro period.

== See also ==
- M45 Quadmount
- List of U.S. military vehicles by model number
- List of U.S. military vehicles by supply catalog designation
- Sd.Kfz. 251, equivalent German half-track

== Sources ==
- Berndt, Thomas (1993). Standard Catalog of U.S. Military Vehicles. Iola, WI: Krause Publications. ISBN 0-87341-223-0.
- Berndt, Thomas (1994). American Tanks of World War II. Minneapolis, MN: MBI Publishing Company. ISBN 0-87938-930-3.
- Doyle, David (2011). Standard Catalog of U.S. Military Vehicles (Second ed.). Iola, WI: Krause Publications. ISBN 978-1-4402-2572-7.
- Gander, Terry (2013). The Bofors Gun. Barnsley, UK: Pen and Sword. ISBN 978-1-4738-3680-8.
- Green, Michael; Green, Gladys (2000). Weapons of Patton's Armies. Minneapolis, MN: MBI Publishing Company. ISBN 0-7603-0821-7.
- Hogg, Ian V.; Weeks, John S. (1980). The Illustrated Encyclopedia of Military Vehicles. Englewood Cliffs, NJ: Prentice Hall. ISBN 0-13-450817-3.
- Hunnicutt, R.P. (2001). Half-Track: A History of American Semi-Tracked Vehicles. Novato, CA: Presidio Press. ISBN 0-89141-742-7.
- Hunter, Kenneth E. (1951). The War Against Germany and Italy: Mediterranean And Adjacent Areas. United States Army in World War II. Washington, DC: Government Printing Office. ISBN 0-16-087289-8.
- Ness, Leland S. (2002). Jane's World War II Tanks and Fighting Vehicles. London, UK: HarperCollins. ISBN 0-00-711228-9.
- Rottman, Gordon (2009). World War II US Armored Infantry Tactics. Oxford, UK: Osprey Publishing. ISBN 978-1-78096-083-8.
- Zaloga, Steven J. (1994). M3 Infantry Half-Track 1940–1973. New Vanguard. Oxford, UK: Osprey Publishing. ISBN 1-85532-467-9.

=== Journals ===
- Magazines, Hearst (December 1943). "Hit-Run Ack-Ack Guns Mounted on a Half-Track". Popular Mechanics. 80 (6): 7. (including "cover artwork")
