= M16 Multiple Gun Motor Carriage =

M16 multiple gun motor carriage
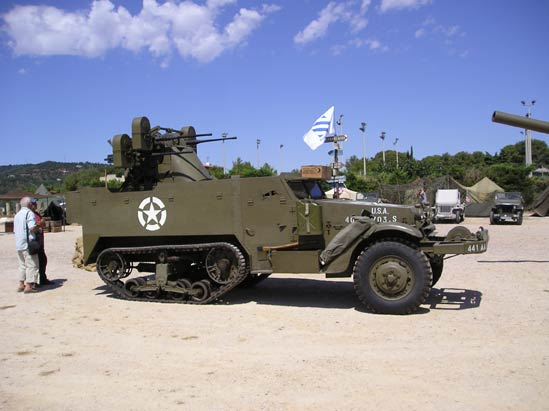
- Place of origin: United States

Service history
- In service: 1943–53
- Used by: See users list
- Wars: World War II, Korean War

Production history
- Designer: White Motor Corporation
- Designed: 1940–42
- Manufacturer: White Motor Corporation
- Produced: 1942–44
- No. built: 3,550 (including ones that were converted from the M13 and T10)

Specifications
- Mass: 9.9 short tons (9 t)
- Length: 21 ft 4 in (6.5 m)
- Width: 7 ft 1 in (2.16 m)
- Height: 7 ft 8 in (2.34 m)
- Crew: 5
- Armor: 12 mm (0.5 in) on sides and front
- Main armament: 4 × 12.7 mm M2 Browning machine guns
- Engine: White 160AX, 386 in^{3} (6,330 cc) 6-cylinder, gasoline, compression ratio 6.3:1, 128 hp (95 kW)
- Power/weight: 15.8 hp/tonne
- Suspension: vertical volute springs; leaf springs for wheels
- Fuel capacity: 60 US gal (230 L)
- Operational range: 175 mi (282 km)
- Maximum speed: 41.7 mph (67.1 km/h)

The M16 multiple gun motor carriage, also known as the M16 half-track, is an American self-propelled anti-aircraft weapon built during World War II. It was equipped with four .50 caliber (12.7 mm) M2 Browning machine guns in an M45 Quadmount. 2700 were produced by White Motor Corporation from May 1943 to March 1944, with 568 M13 MGMCs and 109 T10 half-tracks being converted into M16s as well.

The chassis was derived from the T1E2 chassis, an earlier version of the M13. Based on an M3 half-track chassis, it replaced the M13 MGMC half-track after early 1944. As aircraft became more advanced, the usefulness of the M16 was reduced. In the Korean War, it was relegated primarily to the ground-support role, being put out of service in the U.S. Army in 1958.

Nicknamed the "Meat Chopper", the M16 was famous for its effectiveness against low-flying aircraft and infantry, making it extremely popular with soldiers. It was used by the United States Army, the British Commonwealth, and South Korea. A similar version of the M16, the M17, was based on the M5 half-track and exported via Lend-Lease to the Soviet Union.

== Specifications ==
The specifications of the M16 were similar to those of the M3 half-track. It was 21 ft 4 in (6.5 m) long (with a wheelbase of 135.5 in (3.44 m)), 7 ft 1 in (2.16 m) wide, and 7 ft 8 in (2.34 m) high and weighed 9.9 short tons (9 t). It had suspension consisting of vertical volute spring suspension for the tracks and leaf springs for the wheels.

It was powered by a 128-horsepower (95 kW) White 160AX 386 cubic inch (6,300 cc) 6-cylinder gasoline engine. It had a compression ratio of 6.3:1 and a 60 US gallon (230 L) fuel tank. It could reach a top speed of 41.7 mph (67.1 km/h) and a range of 175 miles (282 km) and a power to weight ratio of 15.8 horsepower per tonne. It had a main armament of four 0.5 in (12.7 mm) machine guns in a M45 Quadmount and 12 millimeters of armor on the front and the sides.

== Development ==
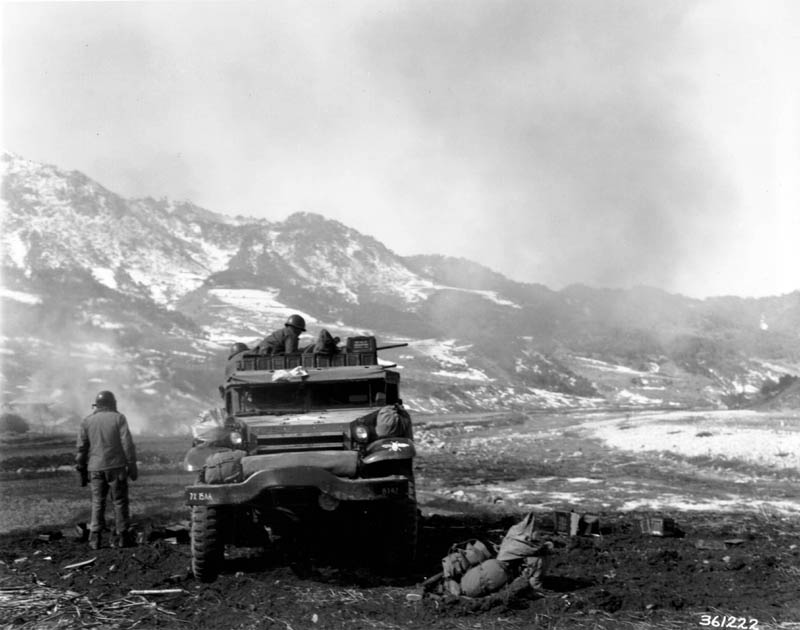
An M16 in March 1951, during the Korean War

The M16 was an improvement on the twin .50 caliber M2 Browning heavy machine gun equipped M13 MGMC and M14 MGMC (built on an M3 and M5 half-track chassis respectively). It was based on an earlier model of the M13 (the T1E2), (Note: The T1E2 featured an M33 Maxson mount on a M2 half-track car chassis, with the only difference with other models being the M33 mount, instead of a Bendix mount.) but the M33 Maxson mount was replaced with the M45 Quadmount and the M2 half-track chassis was replaced by the M3 chassis.

"Weapons Of The Field Artillery" (1953) - Official United States Army artillery training information reel.

This prototype was originally designated as the T61 MGMC, but after trials at Aberdeen it was accepted as the M16 multiple gun motor carriage. A few corrections were made on a pilot vehicle in early 1943 (including the addition of a gun shield) before production started.

A total of 2,877 were produced by the White Motor Corporation during the period from May 1943 to March 1944, while 568 M13s and 109 T10 half-tracks were also converted into M16s. Further production of the M13 and M14 was ceased in favor of production of the M16 and M17 (an M16 built on a M5 half-track chassis).

== Service history ==
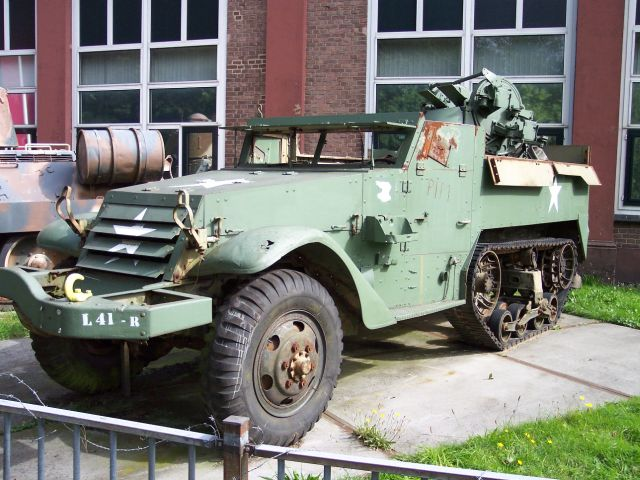
A damaged M16 half-track at a German museum in 2004

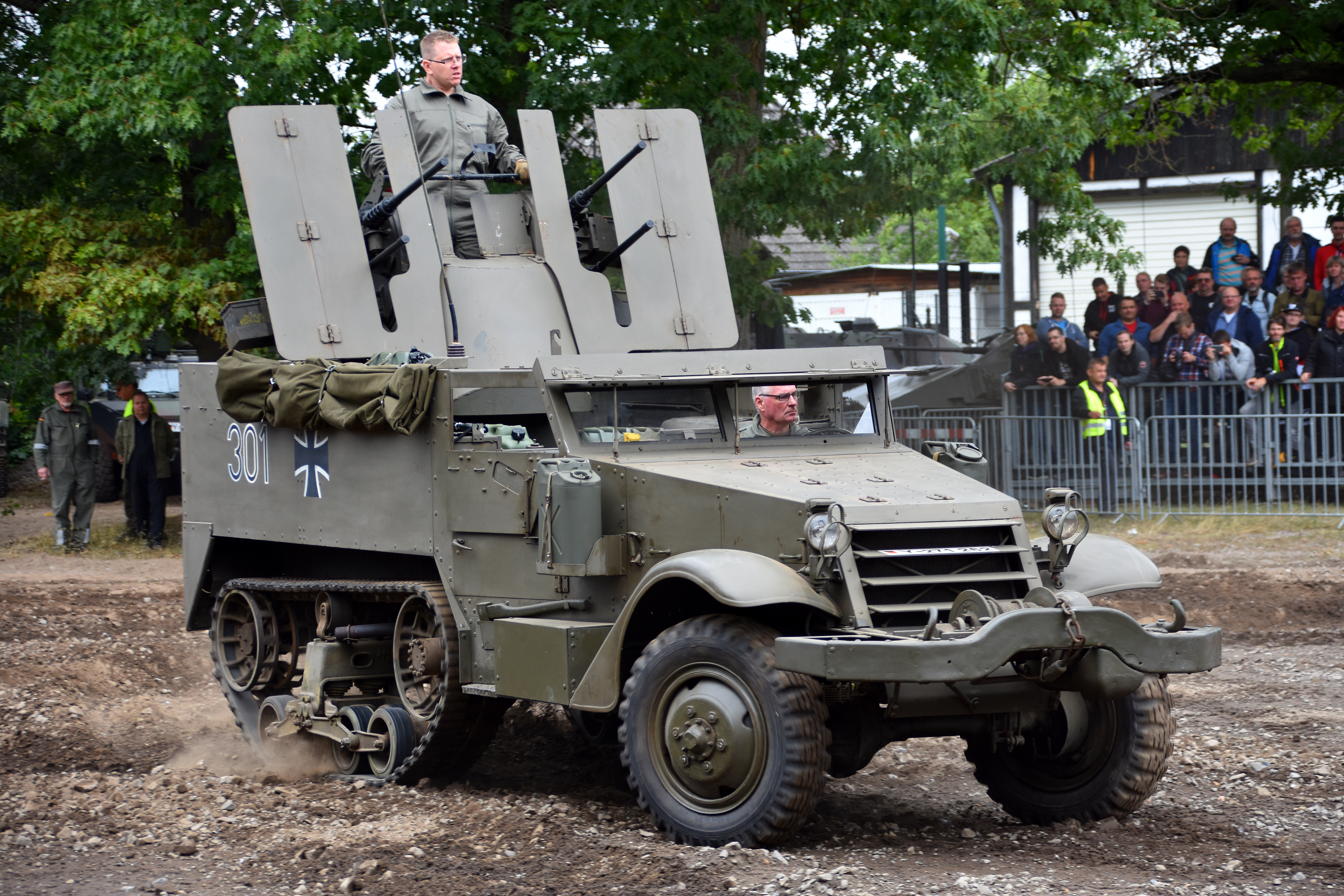
M16A1 from the German Army 'Bundeswehr' at 'Stahl auf der Heide' 2019 - German Tank Museum Munster

The M16 MGMC entered service in early 1944, with the M13 taken out of action soon after. The M16 was nicknamed "The Meat Chopper" for its deadly firepower, and was extremely popular with troops. In addition to its anti-aircraft role, the M16 was used in an infantry support role, frequently accompanied by the M15 half-track. The M17 MGMC primarily served with the Soviet Union as part of Operation Bagration and a few other battles.

The M16 saw service with U.S. forces in the Italian Campaign, and Operation Overlord, the Battle of Arracourt, and the Ardennes Offensive in northern Europe. Small numbers were supplied to the United Kingdom and France under Lend-Lease. The vehicle was also used widely in the Korean War by the South Korean army, the United States Marine Corps, and the U.S. Army.

As aircraft became more advanced over the M16's lifetime, its role as a mobile anti-aircraft weapon became limited, and the newer M19 MGMC was more heavily armed with more powerful and longer-range guns. During the Korean War, it served mainly in the ground-support role, at which it was highly effective. (Note: Most aircraft used during the Korean War went at or close to the speed of sound, making them fast enough to out run a trail of AA fire.) In late 1951, it was declared as "limited standard" and largely taken out of service from the U.S. Army in Korea, although a few examples served until the end of the war. It was declared obsolete by the U.S. Army in 1958.

== Operators ==
- Belgium: Belgian Army – post-war use
- Free France: Free French Forces – Seventy received through the Lend-Lease program
- France - the French Army still had 300 in service in 1984
- Nazi Germany: Wehrmacht – Captured from the U.S.
- Germany: Bundeswehr 1956 - 1962
- Israel: Israel Defense Forces – few units during its early ages
- Japan: Japan Ground Self-Defense Force – Lent by the U.S.
- Netherlands: Royal Netherlands Army – Several bought from war dumps and used in the anti-air units
- Philippines: Philippine Army
- Poland: Polish People's Army M16 used during World war II. M17 variant delivered from USSR in 1945.
- Portugal: Portuguese Army
- South Korea: Republic of Korea Army – 50 vehicles received from the U.S. foreign military aid program.
- USSR: Soviet Army – 1,000 vehicles received through Lend-Lease program
- Thailand: Royal Thai Army – Still using in some anti-air unit
- UK: United Kingdom – Two received through the Lend-Lease program
- USA: United States – United States Army, U.S. Marine Corps

== Variants ==
- M16 – A T1E2 with a M45D quad-mount and a M3 half-track chassis.
- M16A1– An M16 with a M3A1 half-track chassis equipped the M45F Quad-mount.
- M16A2 – M16s with the M45D quad-mount replaced with the M45F Quad-mount.
- M17 MGMC – M5 half-tracks with the M45F quad-mount supplied under Lend Lease to the USSR. A total of 1,000 were produced by International Harvester from December 1943 to March 1944. Up to half of the Soviet Union's air defense forces consisted of M17s.

== See also ==
- List of U.S. military vehicles by model number
- List of U.S. military vehicles by supply catalog designation
