= M13 Multiple Gun Motor Carriage =

M13 multiple gun motor carriage
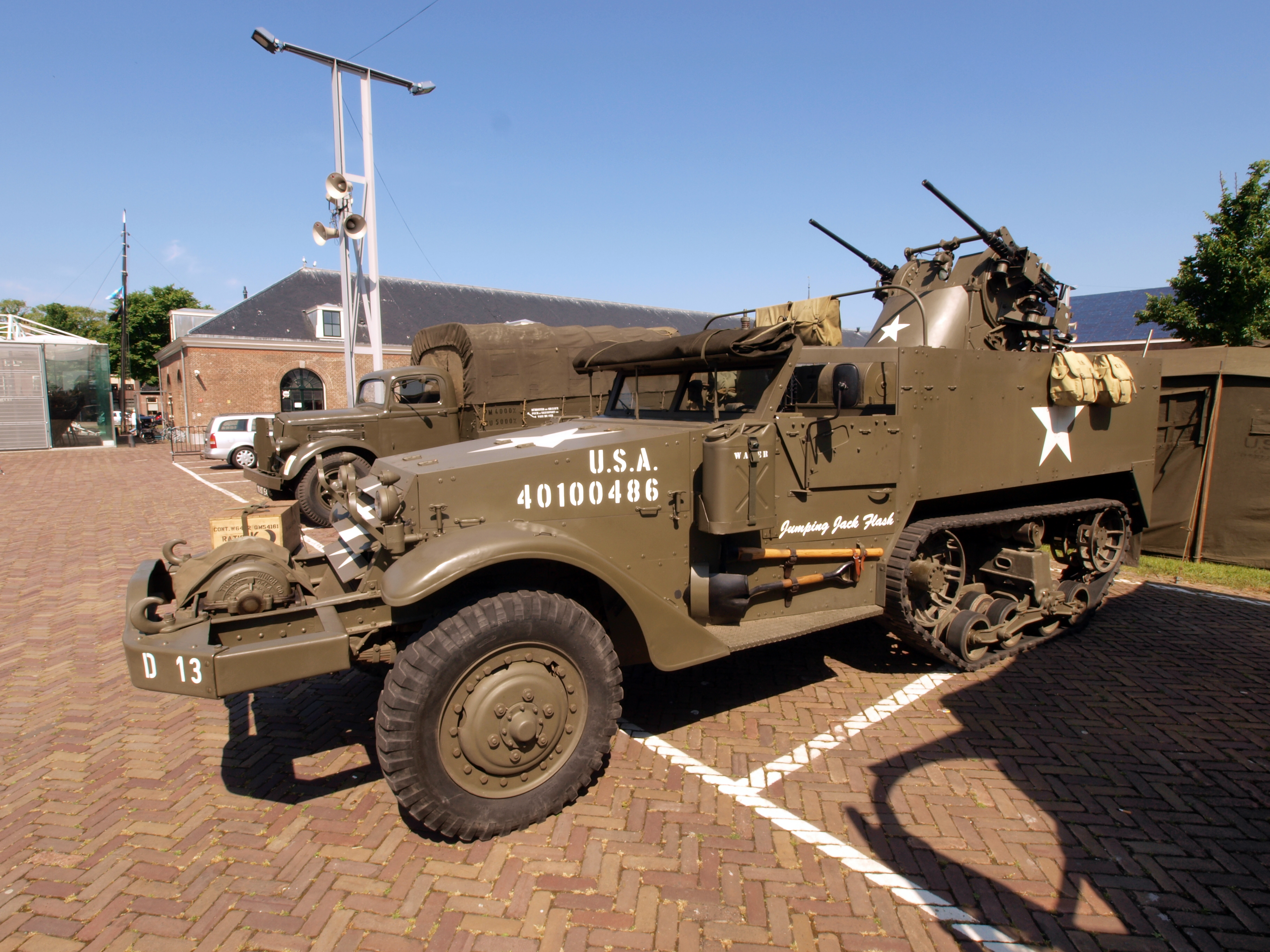
- A restored M13 half-track in a museum in Den Helder
- Type: Self-propelled anti aircraft gun
- Place of origin: United States

Service history
- In service: 1943–44
- Used by: United States
- Wars: World War II

Production history
- Designer: White Motor Corporation
- Designed: 1940–42
- Manufacturer: White Motor Corporation
- Produced: 1942–43
- No. built: 1,103

Specifications
- Length: 21 ft 4 in (6.50 m)
- Width: 7 ft 1 in (2.16 m)
- Height: 7 ft 8 in (2.34 m)
- Crew: 5 (commander, driver, gunner, and two ammunition loaders)
- Armor: 8 to 12.7 mm (0.31 to 0.50 in)
- Main armament: 2 × 0.5 in (12.7 mm) M2 Browning machine guns in a Maxson M33 turret mount
- Engine: White 160AX, 386 in^{3} (6,330 cc), 6-cylinder, gasoline engine, compression ratio 6.3:1, 128 hp (95 kW)
- Power/weight: 15.8 hp/ton
- Suspension: Half-track, vertical volute spring for track, bogies for wheels.
- Fuel capacity: 60 US gal (50 imp gal; 230 L)
- Operational range: 175 mi (282 km)
- Maximum speed: 45 mph (72 km/h)

The M13 multiple gun motor carriage (MGMC), otherwise known as the M13 half-track, was a self-propelled anti-aircraft gun used by the U.S. Army during World War II that was armed with two .50 caliber M2HB heavy-barrel Browning machine guns. Developed in response to a requirement for a mobile anti-aircraft (AA) vehicle, the vehicle was produced by the White Motor Corporation between July 1942 and May 1943. The only time it was ever used in combat was when the Americans landed at Anzio in January 1944. It was replaced by the more heavily armed M16 multiple gun motor carriage in April 1944.

The M13 evolved from a series of several unsuccessful prototypes that were trialed from 1940 to 1942. Of these, the T1E4 was selected and given the official name of the M13 MGMC, before being placed into production. Half of the M13s produced were converted into M16s on the production lines.

== Specifications ==
The M13 half-track was 21 feet 4 inches (6.50 m) long, 7 feet 1 inch (2.16 m) wide, and 7 feet 8 inches (2.34 m) high with a wheelbase of 135.5 inches (3.44 m). It had bogie suspension for the wheels and vertical volute springs for the tracks. It had a 60 US gal (50 imp gal; 230 L) fuel capacity and a range of 175 miles (282 km). The vehicle was powered by a six-cylinder White 160AX, 128 horsepower (95 kW), 386 cubic inches (6,325 cc) gasoline engine, with a compression ratio of 6.3:1. It had a power-to-weight ratio of 15.8 horsepower per short ton (17.7 hp/LT; 17.4 hp/t) and weighed nine short tons (8.0 long tons; 8.2 t). The armor across most of the vehicle was 0.25 inches (6.35 mm) thick with a 0.5 inches (12.7 mm) thick windscreen visor. The vehicle was armed with two 0.5 inch M2 Browning heavy machine guns placed on an M33 Maxson mount. The two machine guns were fired remotely and powered by a small electrical motor near the back of the turret. The guns were aimed with a Mark 9 reflector sight. Each vehicle had a crew of five (commander, driver, gunner, and two ammunition loaders).

== Development ==
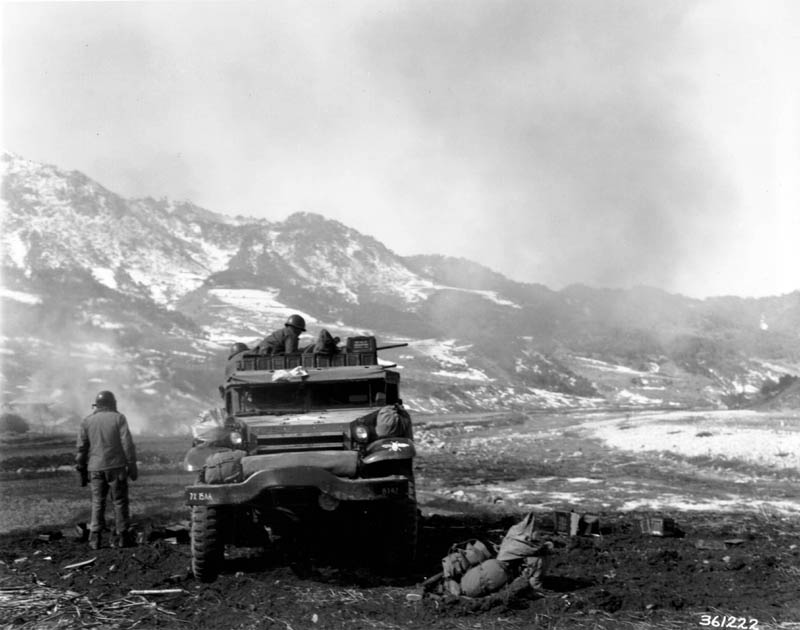
The M16 multiple gun motor carriage, the successor to the M13.

=== Early experiments ===
In October 1940, development began to produce a vehicle in response to a long-standing requirement for an anti-aircraft vehicle to protect the U.S. Army's mechanized troop convoys from aerial attack. The first vehicle produced in the development of a half-track with an anti-aircraft armament was the T1, which had two M2 machine guns on a Bendix machine gun mount—as used on jeeps—on a 4×4 truck. The T1E1 had a power-operated Bendix mount, and the T1E2 a Maxson mount. The T1E3 had an electro-dynamic Glenn L. Martin Company aircraft-type turret. Evaluation of these test vehicles led to the T1E2 design being preferred. The T1E2 became the M16 half-track by replacing the M33 with the M45 mount and the M2 half-track chassis with the M3 half-track chassis.

=== T1E4 and M13 ===
The next stage of development was to use the T1E2 configuration on the longer chassis of the M3 half-track, since it could store more ammunition. This vehicle, originally designated as the T1E4, was accepted into production as the M13 multiple gun motor carriage on 27 July 1942. A total of 1,103 examples of this variant were produced from 27 July 1942 to 15 May 1943. Half of them (583) were converted into M16s by White Motor Corporation before reaching the army. Deliveries began in late 1943.

== Service history ==
The M13 served at the landing at Anzio with the VI Corps of the Fifth United States Army in January 1944. It was used as an anti-aircraft weapon during the initial landing and then later as a ground support weapon to repel heavy German panzer attacks on the beachhead. It was replaced three months later by the M16 multiple gun motor carriage in April 1944. Only 139 examples were deployed overseas by the U.S. Army.

Ten were transferred to the United Kingdom under Lend-Lease.

== Prototypes ==
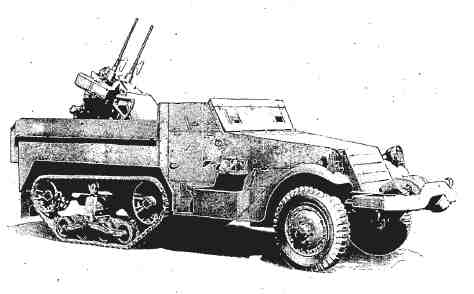
The M13 multiple gun motor carriage.

- T1 – This variant used two M2 Browning heavy machine guns on a Bendix mount on a 4×4 truck. This model, like most of the others, was a prototype. It was tested in June–July 1941 at the Aberdeen Proving Grounds, but was rejected because of the "excessive dispersion of ammunition".
- T1E1 – Another prototype that used the Bendix mount on a M2 half-track car. It was cancelled in April 1942.
- T1E2 – This variant was essentially the same as the T1E1 except the Bendix mount was replaced with the M33 Maxson mount. After the M33 was replaced with the M45 Quadmount it was accepted as the M16 half-track.
- T1E3 – A T1E1 with a Martin turret designed for use on bombers.

== Derivatives ==
- T1E4/M13 – The Martin turret was replaced by the M33 and was based on the M3 half-track. It was accepted as the M13 half-track in July 1942. A total of 139 examples of this variant saw action at Anzio as a ground support weapon used to repel heavy German attacks. It was replaced by the M16 in April 1944.
- M14 half-track – This variant had the same armament as the M13 but used the slightly different M5 half-track chassis built by International Harvester for the Lend-Lease Program. The M14 was mostly supplied to Britain, where they were converted back to regular half-tracks. A total of 1602 were produced by International Harvester.

== See also ==
- List of U.S. military vehicles by model number
- List of U.S. military vehicles by supply catalog designation
