= M45 quad mount =

American machine gun mount

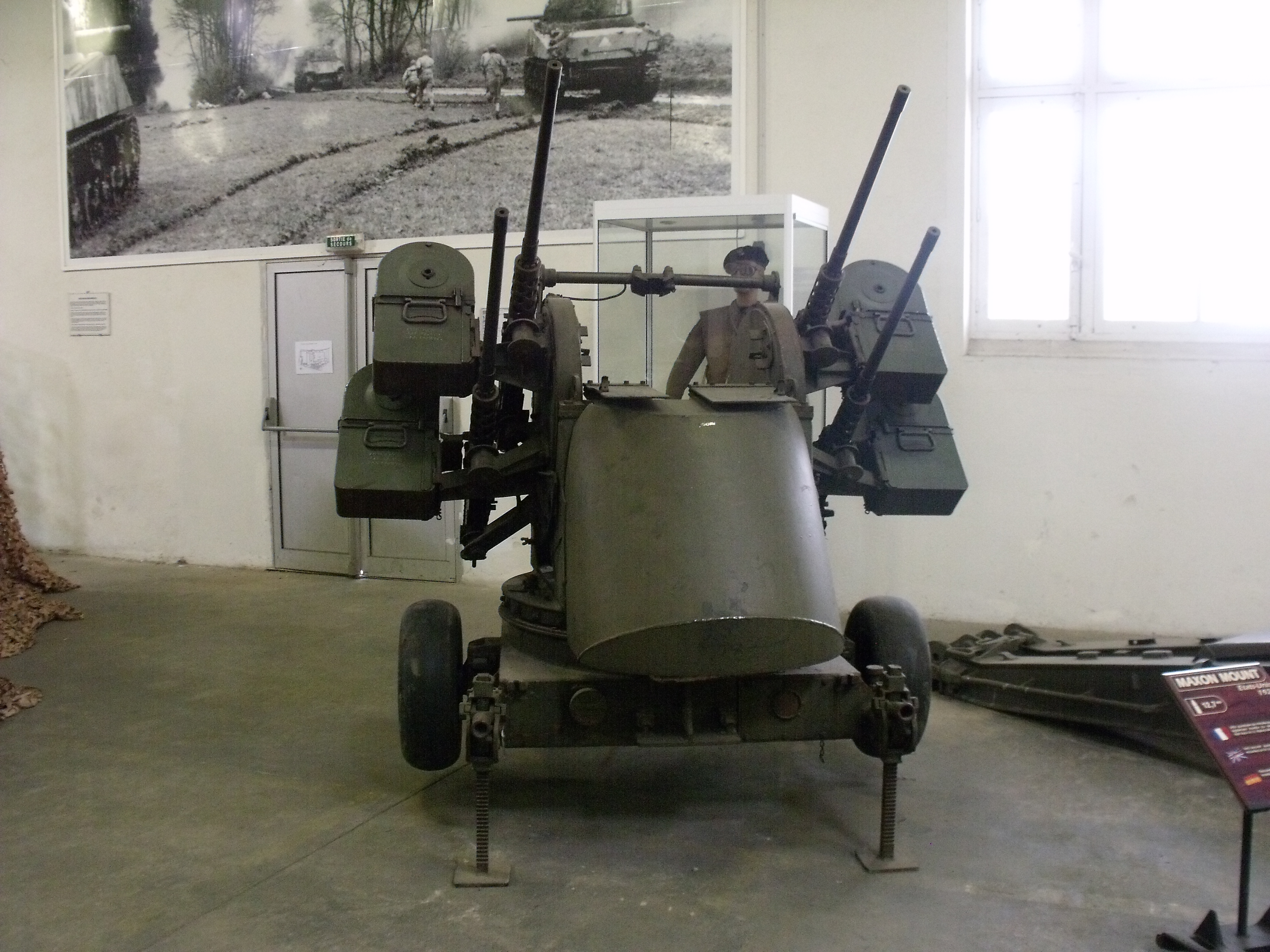
- M45 on an M20 trailer in the Musée des Blindés
- Type: Anti-aircraft gun, heavy machine gun
- Place of origin: United States

Service history
- Wars: World War II; First Indochina War; Korean War; Vietnam War; Portuguese Colonial War; Indo-Pakistani War of 1965; Lebanese Civil War; 1978 South Lebanon conflict Nicaraguan Revolution; Paquisha War; 1982 Lebanon War; Sino-Vietnamese War; Third Indochina War; Salvadoran Civil War

Specifications
- Mass: 2,396 lb (1,087 kg)
- Barrel length: 5 ft 3 in (1.6 m) L/50
- Shell: .50 BMG (12.7×99mm NATO)
- Shell weight: 21 oz (.6 kg)
- Caliber: 0.50 in (12.7 mm)
- Action: Short recoil-operated
- Elevation: -5° to +90°
- Traverse: 360°
- Rate of fire: 575 x 4 = 2,300 rpm
- Muzzle velocity: 2,900 ft/s (890 m/s)
- Effective firing range: 4,900 ft (1.5 km) (effective AA); 15,000 ft (4.5 km) (maximum AA)
- Maximum firing range: 1.1 mi (1.8 km) (horizontal); 1.6 mi (2.5 km) (maximum)
- Feed system: Belt-fed (M2 or M9 links)

The M45 quad mount is a towed anti-aircraft gun consisting of four .50 caliber M2 Browning machine guns mounted in pairs on either side of an armored open-top gunner's compartment with electrical laying. It was developed by the W. L. Maxson Corporation to replace the earlier M33 twin mount (also from Maxson). Although designed as an anti-aircraft weapon, it was also used against ground targets, where it earned the nicknames "meat chopper" and "Krautmower". Introduced in 1944, it saw service as late as the Vietnam War.

== History ==
In order to develop a mobile anti-aircraft weapon, several 0.5 inch (12.7mm) twin machine gun mounts were tested on the chassis of the M2 half-track including Bendix, Martin Aircraft Company, and Maxson. The Maxson M33 turret mount was preferred and—on the larger M3 half-track (T1E2)—was accepted for service in 1942 as the M13 Multiple Gun Motor Carriage. The mount was also used on the similar M5 half track as the M14 Multiple Gun Motor Carriage.

Experimentally, the quad mount was also tested in 1942 on a M3 light tank in place of the tank's turret but the project was terminated.

Even as production of the two MGMC vehicles was underway, there was work to increase the firepower. Re-working the M33 to take four machine guns produced the M45 mounting.

The M45 quad mount was the principal weapon (along with the 37 mm gun) of highly mobile anti-aircraft artillery battalions deployed in the European Theater during World War II. These battalions provided invaluable air defense to much larger units, particularly field artillery. The M45 quad mount units served as a very strong deterrent to strafing runs by enemy warplanes as, in addition to their gross firepower, its quartet of Browning M2HB "heavy barrel" .50 caliber guns were capable of being "tuned" to converge upon a single point at distances which could be reset while in use. Multiple-gun mounts were developed for the M2 Browning because the M2's rate of fire (450–550 rounds per minute) for a single gun was too low for anti-aircraft use.

The M45 found use throughout the war as a land-based weapon, particularly during the Battle of the Bulge. Although the Allies achieved air supremacy by the invasion of Normandy in June 1944, German attack runs were still a threat. German Jabo fighter-bombers could approach and attack at low altitude and then quickly retreat to avoid Allied fighters. The Luftwaffe also mustered a large number of planes for Operation Bodenplatte that took place on New Year's Day 1945.

It was also tested by the US Navy as a solution for the Kamikaze attacks that started in late 1944. Two Essex class aircraft carriers received six mounts each for operational testing starting with CV-16 Lexington in May 1945. The guns were too light and ineffective against the high speeds that the diving Kamikaze aircraft possessed.

The M45 quad mount was ineffective against the new, fast-flying planes of the Jet Age. However, it was used against infantry targets in US post-war service. In Vietnam they were pressed into service to defend bases and to ride escort convoys along Viet Cong roads.

The French Army also used M45s in combat. M45 Quad Mounts were placed in trucks to deal with ambushes and four M45s were used during the Battle of Dien Bien Phu.

=== TCM-20 ===
The TCM-20 was a postwar Israeli development of the M45 mount, equipped with two 20mm Hispano-Suiza HS.404 cannons in lieu of machine guns. In frontline Israeli service, it was replaced by the M163 Vulcan Air Defense System in the 1970s, but some reserve units still used TCM-20s into the 1980s. The weapon was also exported to several third-world countries.

== Mountings ==
During World War II, the M45 turret was mounted on two specific systems; the M16 Multiple Gun Motor Carriage and the M51 Multiple Machine Gun Carriage. When mounted on the M20 trailer, it was known as the M55 Machine Gun Trailer Mount, but this system had not finished testing before the cessation of hostilities. M51s were withdrawn from service by the end of World War II in favor of the M55.

During the Korean War, the M55 and M16 saw extensive combat, and lessons learned in Korea led to the conversion of an additional 1200 M3 halftracks into the M16A1 variant by adding an M45 turret. These can be identified by the lack of fold-down armor and rear troop door on the crew compartment and were often fitted with the roller front bumper instead of the winch bumper fitted to all M16s. In 1954 an additional modification was made to roughly 700 M16 MGMCs, adding the rear troop door and bolting the fold-down armor in the up position. This modification became known as the M16A2 MGMC.

The M55 received a new, more powerful generator in the 1960s and served through the Vietnam War, usually mounted in the back of an M35 2.5 ton or M54 5-ton gun trucks.

== Operation ==
The M45 is operated by two loaders and one gunner. The mount is capable of traversing a full 360 degrees around, with an angle elevation between -10 and +90 degrees. Traverse and elevation are electrically driven, powered by two rechargeable 6-volt batteries. All four guns could be fired at once, but standard practice was to alternate between firing the upper and lower pair of guns, allowing one pair to cool while the other was in use. This allowed for longer periods of action as overheating of the gun barrels was lessened.

The "tombstone" model M2 ammunition chests held 200 rounds each—with one ammunition chest on an M45 system holding ten times as many rounds as each of the four twenty-round 20mm magazines of the German Flakvierling system held (and which, on the German ordnance system, had to be changed every six seconds on each gun of the quartet to ensure its own top 800 rpm "combined" firing rate), with each M2 ammo chest weighing 89 pounds each when full.

== Gallery ==
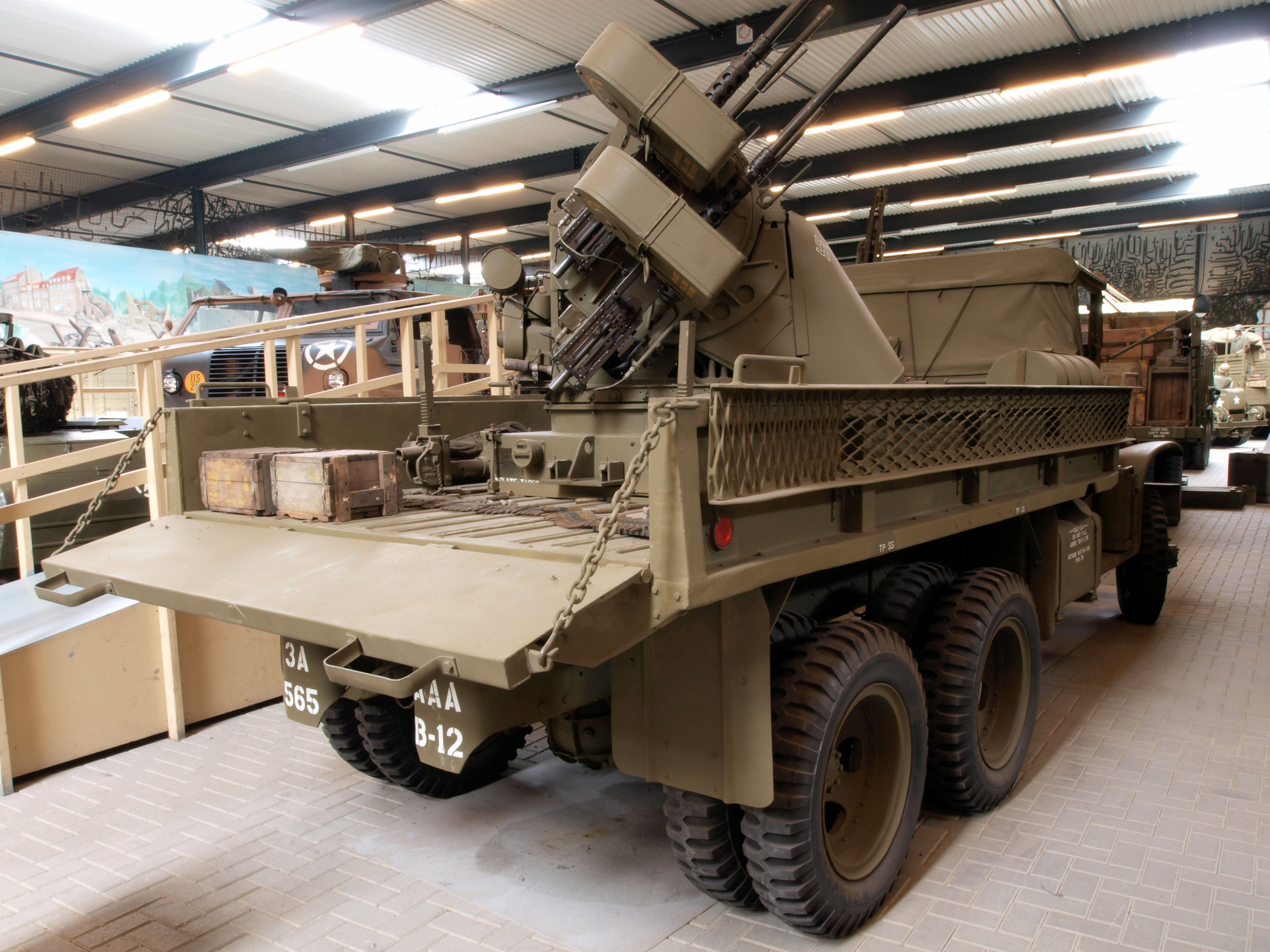
CCKW-353-B2 gun truck with M45 on M20 trailer in bed. This configuration did not see combat in World War II as it was still in testing by the cessation of hostilities

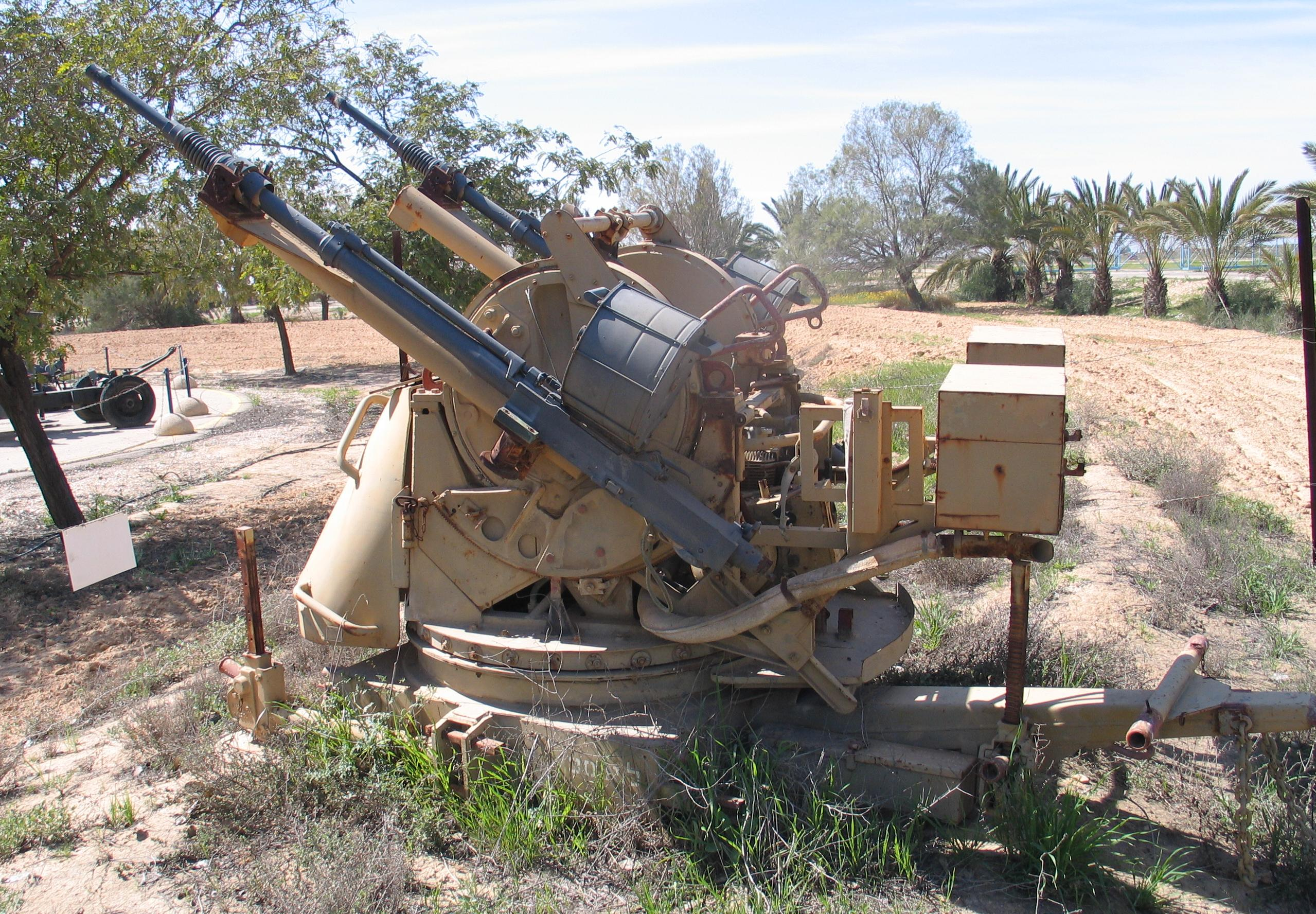
Israeli TCM-20, Israeli Air Force Museum, equipped with a pair of 20mm Hispano-Suiza HS.404 cannon

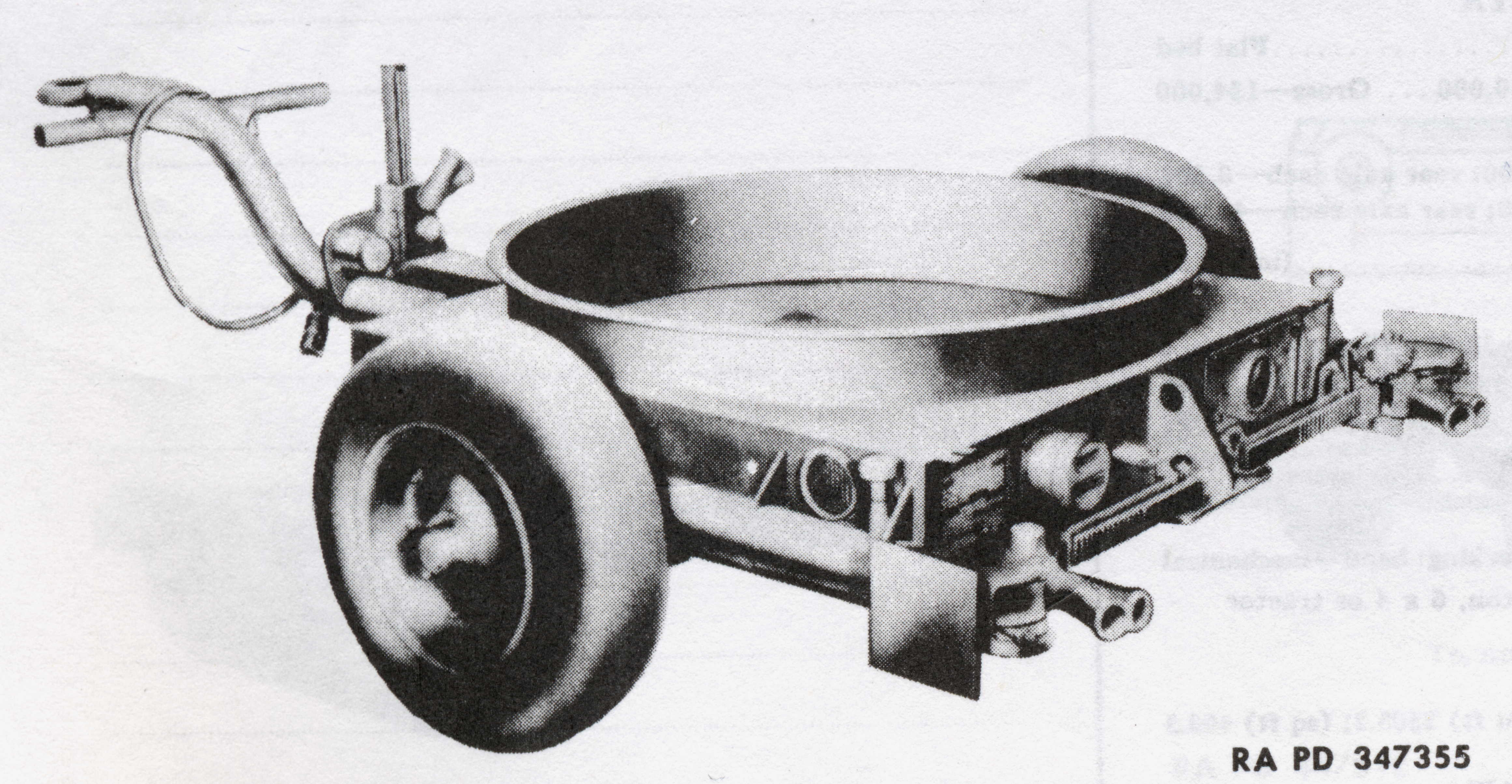
M20 trailer mount, 1947

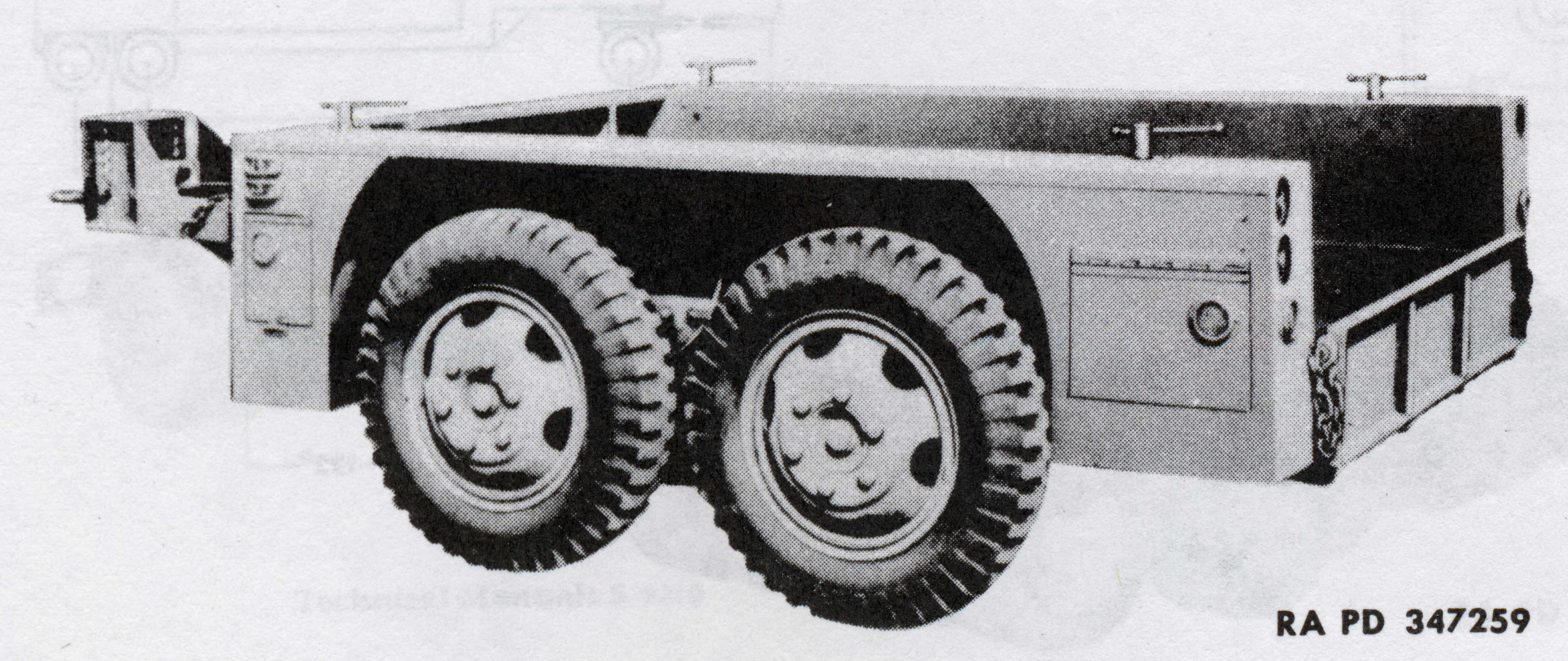
M17 trailer mount, 1947

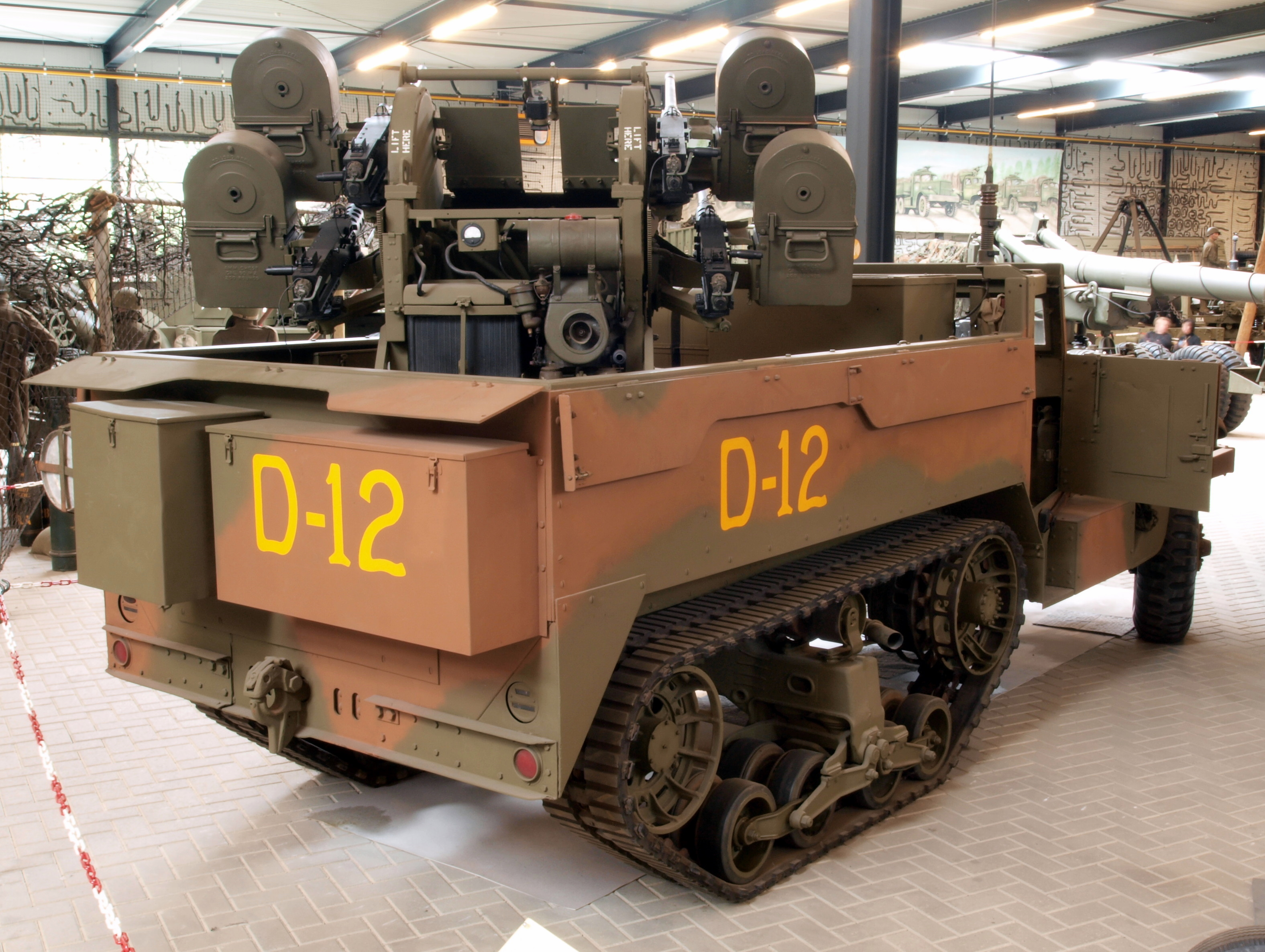
M16 MGMC

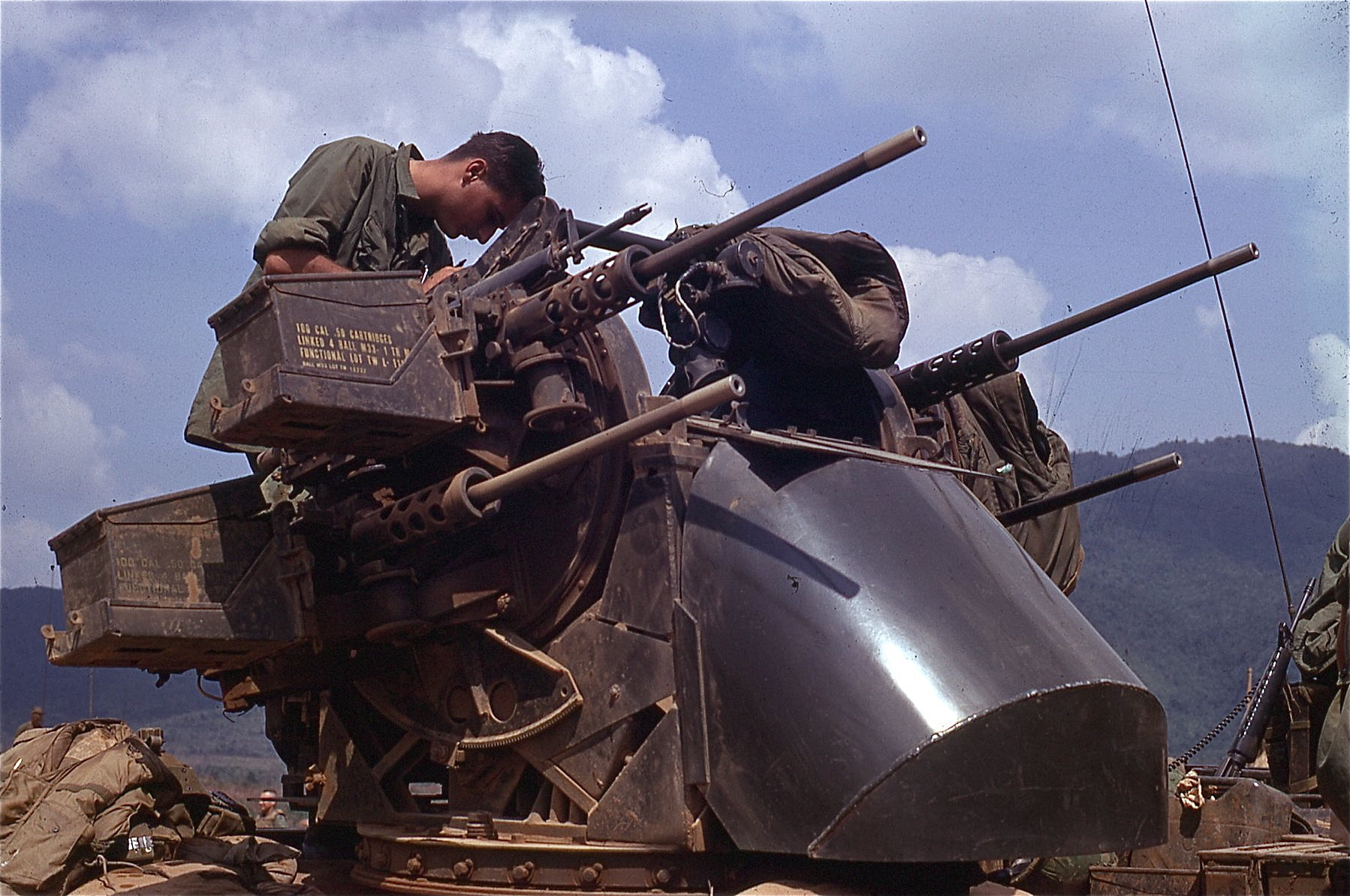
Quad mount used for convoy security along Route 9, Vietnam 1968

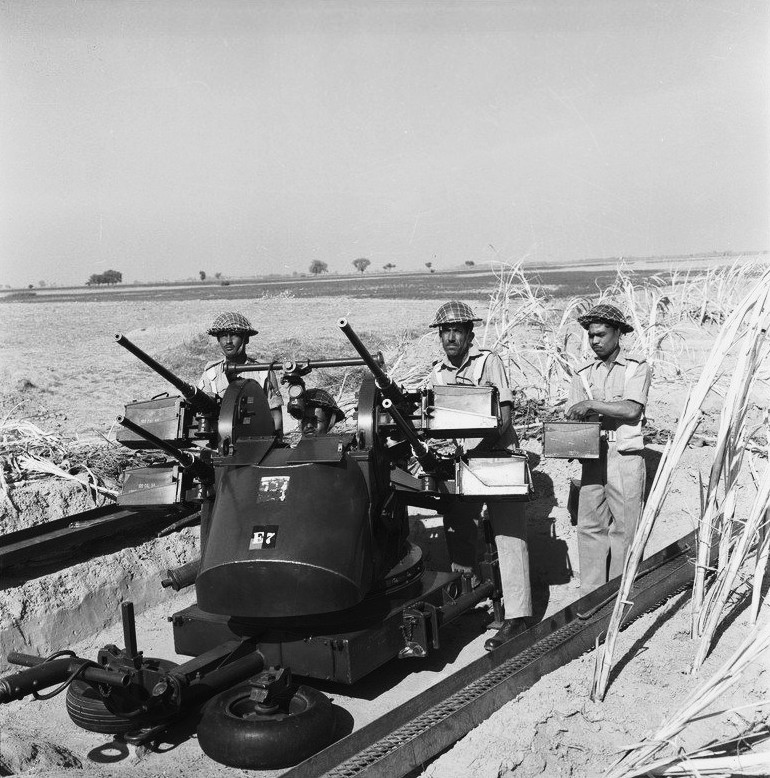
Pakistani soldiers operating an M45 quad mount during the 1965 conflict with India

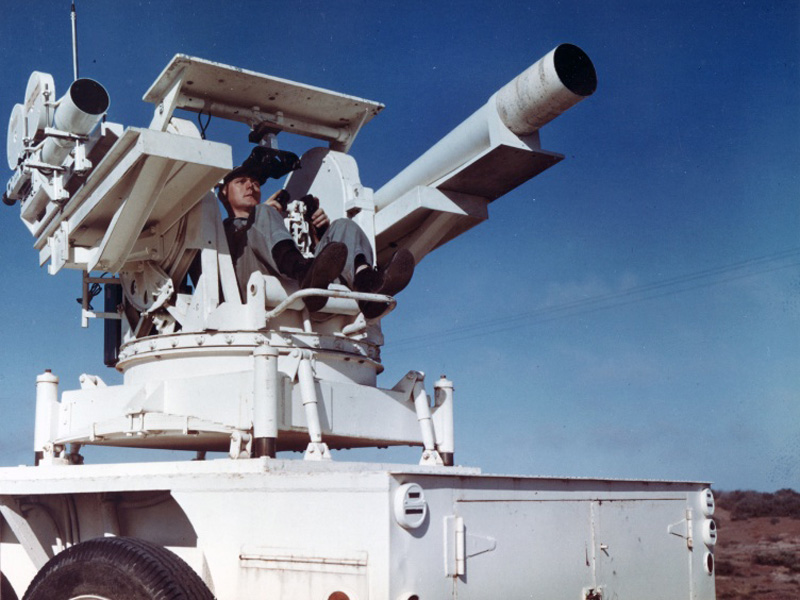
Photographer on an M45 repurposed as camera mount at Lookout Mountain Air Force Station

== Operators ==
- Belgium: Belgian Army
- Colombia: M45 units mounted on M8 Greyhound armoured cars by the Colombian Army, used as counter-insurgency weapons against guerrilla ambushes in the Colombian mountains.
- Ecuador
- El Salvador: TCM-20
- Denmark
- France
- Haiti: TCM-20, 6 units
- Israel: TCM-20
- Italy
- Japan: Japan Ground Self-Defense Force
- Jordan
- Mexico: 84 M45 units in service with the Mexican Army.
- Netherlands: Royal Netherlands Army
- Nicaragua: National Guard of Nicaragua
- Taiwan (Republic of China)
- Thailand: Royal Thai Army
- South Korea: Republic of Korea Army
- South Vietnam: Vietnamese National Army, Army of the Republic of Vietnam
- Turkey
- Pakistan
- Philippines: Philippine Army
- Portugal: M45 in service with the Portuguese Army as the Metralhadora Quádrupla AA 12,7 mm m/953.
- United States
- West Germany: Bundeswehr (1956–1962)
- Vietnam

== See also ==
- List of U.S. military vehicles by supply catalog designation
- DTM-4
- Flakvierling 38, quadruple 20 mm autocannon-based weapon system mountable onto a Sd.Kfz. 7/1 half-track, as just one example
- Wirbelwind, quad-barrel 2 cm Flakvierling 38.
- ZPU-4, quadruple 14.5mm heavy machine gun-based weapon system mountable onto technicals, cargo trucks, and APCs.
- M42 Duster, dual 40mm autocannon, post war SPAA operational until 1988.
