= M9 half-track =

US military vehicle

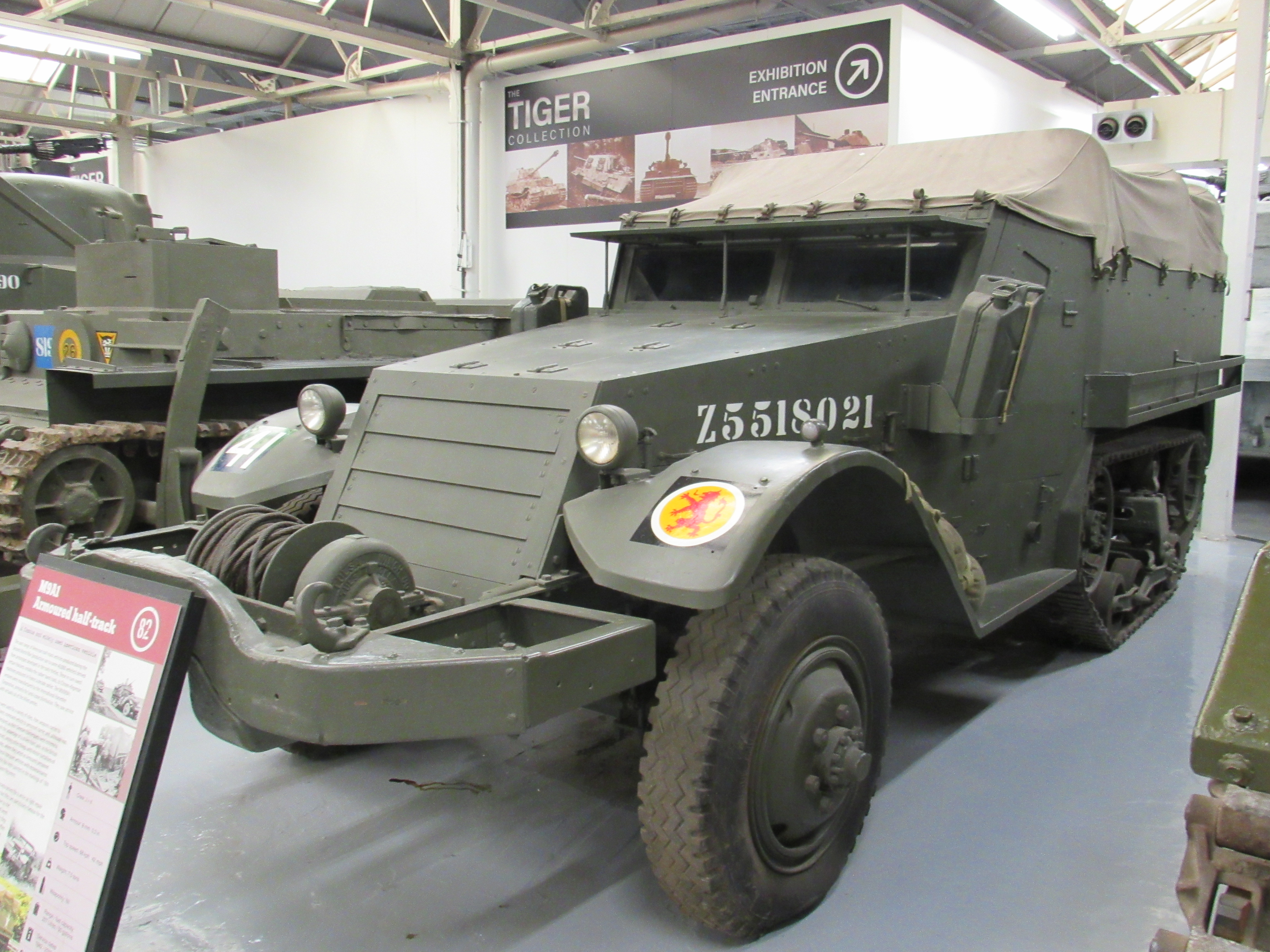
- Preserved M9A1 half-track
- Type: Half-track armored personnel carrier
- Place of origin: United States

Service history
- In service: 1943–present
- Used by: See users list
- Wars: World War II; Arab-Israeli War of 1948; Korean War; Suez Crisis; Vietnam War; Indo-Pakistani War; Six-Day War; Yom Kippur War; Lebanese Civil War

Production history
- Designer: International Harvester
- Designed: 1940–1941
- Manufacturer: International Harvester
- Produced: 1942–1944
- No. built: 3,500

Specifications
- Mass: 9.3 short tons (8.4 t)
- Length: 20 ft 7 in (6.28 m) wheelbase 135.5 in (3.44 m)
- Width: 7 ft 3 in (2.22 m)
- Height: 7 ft 5 in (2.26 m)
- Crew: 3
- Passengers: 10 troops
- Armor: 8–16 mm (0.31–0.63 in)
- Main armament: 1 × 0.50 inch (12.7 mm) M2 Browning machine gun
- Secondary armament: 2 × 0.30 inch (7.62 mm) M1919 Browning machine guns
- Engine: IHC RED-450-B; 141 hp (105 kW)
- Suspension: wheels at front single bogie vertical volute spring tracks at rear
- Fuel capacity: 60 US gal (230 L)
- Operational range: 125 mi (201 km)
- Maximum speed: 42 mph (68 km/h)

The M9 half-track was a half-track produced by International Harvester in the United States during World War II for lend-lease supply to the Allies. It was designed to provide a similar vehicle to the M2 half-track car. It had the same body and chassis as the M5 half-track (also built by International Harvester for lend-lease) but had the same stowage and radio fit as the M2 half-track.

The M9 served for a significant length of time. 3500 were produced by the end of World War II. It was used during World War II, the Arab-Israeli War of 1948, the Korean War, the Suez Crisis, the Vietnam War, the Six-Day War, and the Yom Kippur War. It had been used by eleven countries by the end of its service.

== Development ==
The United States adopted half-tracks in large numbers as they could be built more quickly and cheaply by civilian vehicle producers than vehicles from the established armored vehicle manufacturers. The M2 half-track car had first been intended as an artillery tractor, but was also used for carrying the machine gun squads of armored infantry regiments and for reconnaissance units until faster and better-armed M8 Greyhound armored cars were available.

In order to supply U.S. allies, much more production was required than was possible through the firms producing the M2 (and the larger M3 half-track). International Harvester (IH) could produce half-tracks, but some differences had to be accepted due to different manufacturing methods and components. This led to IH producing for lend-lease the M5 half-track and M9 as equivalents for the M3 and M2 respectively.

== Design ==
The M9 used the same chassis and mechanical components as the M5. It was laid out to provide similar stowage, access to the radios from the inside, rear doors, and a pedestal machine gun mount as with the M2. The M9A1 variant of the M9 matched the improvements made to the M2, M3, and M5, changing to ring mount machine gun mount and three pintle machine gun mounts.

As with the M5, due to the lack of face-hardened armor, homogenous armor was used. Although thicker, it gave less protection and could be penetrated by armor-piercing rifle bullets from 300 yards (270 m) rather than 200 yards (180 m). The armor also made the vehicle heavier, though the performance was essentially similar.

== Service history ==
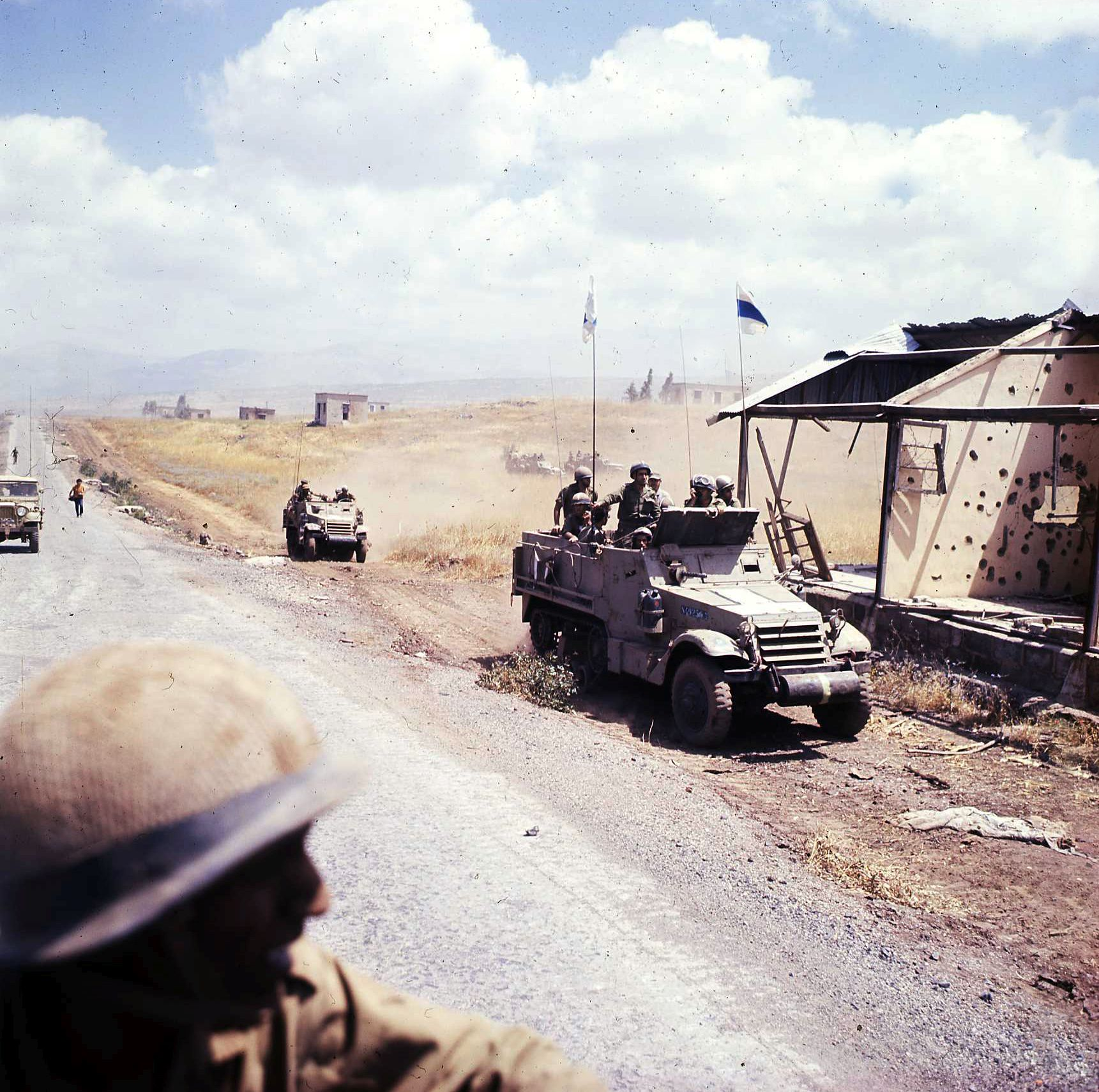
Israeli halftracks in the Golan Heights during the Six-Days War in 1967.

The M9 started production in August 1942, at IH. The M9 and M9A1 were manufactured en masse and 2,026 were produced in total. According to American military historian and defense specialist Steven Zaloga, 2,026 M9s and 1,407 M9A1s were produced in 1943.

The M9 was used in World War II, the Arab-Israeli War of 1948, the Korean War, the Indo-Pakistani War, the Suez Crisis, and many other conflicts. The production of M9s was leased to other countries, like most other IH half-tracks produced in World War II. This M9A1 was leased to both the Soviet Union and the United Kingdom, with the latter providing it to other countries in the British Commonwealth.

== Operators ==
The M9 was used by many countries but not the United States, as there was sufficient M2 and M3 production for U.S. needs. The UK leased some half-tracks to Free France and other governments-in-exile. The Soviet Union received them directly. Following World War II, the second-hand market was a source of supply for some countries, including Israel. M9 half-tracks were provided by the U.S. under the Military Aid Program to the following countries:

- Brazil
- Canada
- Republic of China
- Czechoslovakia
- France – including 603 M9/M9A1 half-tracks from the US Army
- Israel
- Japan
- Pakistan
- Peru
- Poland
- Soviet Union – 413 M9s received from the US under Lend-Lease
- United Kingdom

== See also ==
- List of U.S. military vehicles by model number
- List of U.S. military vehicles by supply catalog designation
