= 37 mm gun M1 =

37 mm gun M1A2 on carriage M3
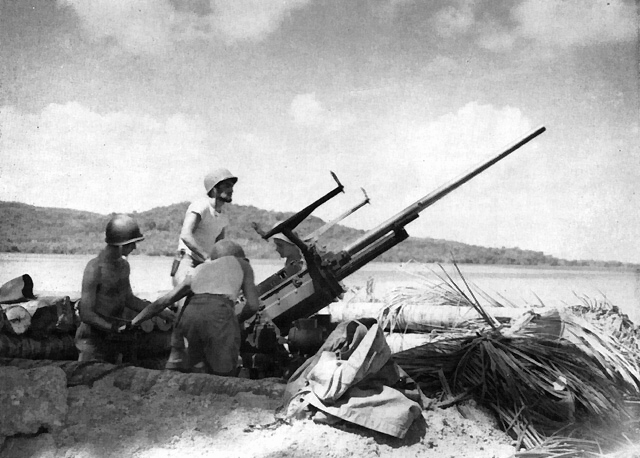
- 37 mm antiaircraft gun in the Solomon Islands.
- Type: Anti-aircraft autocannon
- Place of origin: United States

Service history
- Used by: USA
- Wars: World War II; Rhodesian Bush War

Production history
- Designer: John M. Browning and the Colt company
- Produced: 1939–July 1943
- No. built: At least 7,278

Specifications
- Mass: 2,780 kg (6,130 lb)
- Barrel length: bore: 2 m (6.56 ft) / 54 calibers
- Width: 1.7 m (5 ft 7 in)
- Height: 1.8 m (5 ft 11 in)
- Shell: Fixed QF 37×223mmSR
- Shell weight: .61 kg (1 lb 6 oz)
- Caliber: 37 mm (1.45 in)
- Breech: vertical block
- Carriage: four-wheeled trailer
- Elevation: -5° to + 90°
- Traverse: 360°
- Rate of fire: 120 rounds per minute
- Muzzle velocity: 792 m/s (2,598 ft/s)
- Effective firing range: 3,200 m (3,499 yds)
- Maximum firing range: 8,275 m (9,049 yds)

The 37 mm gun M1 was an anti-aircraft autocannon developed in the United States. It was used by the US Army in World War II.

The gun was produced in a towed variant, or mounted along with two M2 machine guns on the M2/M3 half-track, resulting in the T28/T28E1/M15/M15A1 series of multiple gun motor carriages.

In early World War II, each Army Anti-Aircraft Artillery (AAA) Auto-Weapons battalion was authorized a total of thirty-two 37 mm guns in its four firing batteries, plus other weapons.

During World War II, the 37 mm gun M1 was deployed in coast defense anti-motor torpedo boat batteries (AMTB) alongside 90 mm guns, usually four 90 mm and two 37 mm guns per battery. Some AMTB batteries consisted of four 37 mm guns, but most sources have little information on these batteries. In the later part of the war, the 37 mm gun was typically replaced by the 40 mm Bofors gun M1.

== Components ==
One or two gun units were coupled to the M5 gun director using the M1 remote control system. The system was powered by the M5 generating unit. If the remote system was inoperative, the M5 sighting system was used, but it was only usable up to 25 degrees of elevation.

== Ammunition ==
The M1 utilized fixed ammunition. Projectiles were fitted with a 37×223mmSR cartridge case.

Available ammunition
Type	Model	Weight (round/projectile)	Filler	Muzzle velocity	Range horizontal/vertical
APC-T	APC-T M59A1 Shot	1.44/0.87 kg (3.17/1.91 lbs)	-	625 m/s (2,050 ft/s)	5,290/3,660 m (17,355/12,007 ft)
HE-T	HE-T SD M54 Shell	1.21/0.61 kg (2.66/1.34 lbs)		792 m/s (2,598 ft/s)	8,275/5,760 m (27,149/18,897 ft)

Armor penetration table
Ammunition / Distance	457 m (500 yds)	914 m (1000 yds)	1,371 m (1,500 yds)	1,828 m (2,000 yds)
APC-T M59A1 Shot (homogeneous armor, meet angle 30°)	23 mm (.90 in)	18 mm (.70 in)	15 mm (.59 in)	13 mm (.51 in)
APC-T M59A1 Shot (face-hardened armor, meet angle 30°)	25 mm (.98 in)	18 mm (.70 in)	15 mm (.59 in)	13 mm (.51 in)

== Variants ==
- The 37 mm M9 autocannon was a derivative of the M1A2 anti-aircraft gun. It had a 74 in (1.9 m) barrel, weighed 405 lb (184 kg) (the barrel alone weighing 120 pounds), had a muzzle velocity of 3,000 ft/s (910 m/s), and had a rate of fire of 150 rounds per minute. It was used on PT boats around 1944 in the Pacific theater during World War II, replacing the M4 autocannon.

== Comparison of anti-aircraft guns ==
Country	Gun model	RPM	Projectile weight
United States	37 mm gun M1	120	.61 kg (1.3 lb)
Nazi Germany	3.7 cm SK C/30	30	.74 kg (1.6 lb)
France	Canon de 37 mm Modèle 1925	15-21	.72 kg (1.6 lb)
Italy	Cannone-Mitragliera da 37/54 (Breda)	60-120	.82 kg (1.8 lb)
Nazi Germany	3.7 cm Flak 18/36/37/43	150	.64 kg (1.4 lb)
Soviet Union	37 mm automatic air defense gun M1939 (61-K)	80	.73 kg (1.6 lb)
United Kingdom	QF 2-pounder naval gun	115	.91 kg (2.0 lb)
Sweden	Bofors 40 mm gun	120	.9 kg (2.0 lb)

== See also ==
- List of U.S. Army weapons by supply catalog designation
- Kerrison Predictor
