= Limited standard =

Military logistics term

Limited standard was a term used by the United States Army during World War II. The term was applied to equipment, such as the M22 Locust, which met certain standards set by the United States Ordnance Department but did not reach the standards required by the Department for the equipment to be issued to combat units.
