= Vertical volute spring suspension =

Type of vehicle suspension system

The vertical volute spring suspension system is a type of vehicle suspension system that uses volute springs to compensate for surface irregularities. This type of the suspension system was mainly fitted on US and Italian tanks and armored fighting vehicles starting from throughout the 1930s up until after the end of the Second World War in 1945.

== Principle ==
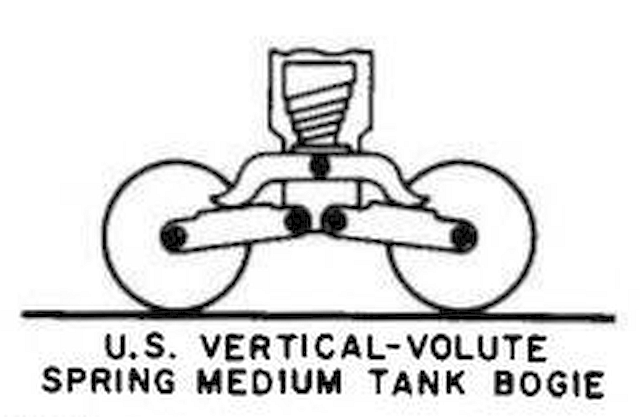
U.S. Vertical volute spring suspension (AMCP 706-355)

The horizontal arms connected to the road wheels are cranks that drive the vertical arm up and down. The vertical arm connects to the volute spring in the box-shaped area above.

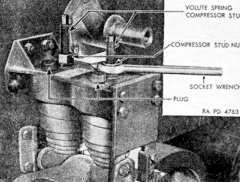
The vertical volute-springs of the American Stuart tank.

== Development ==
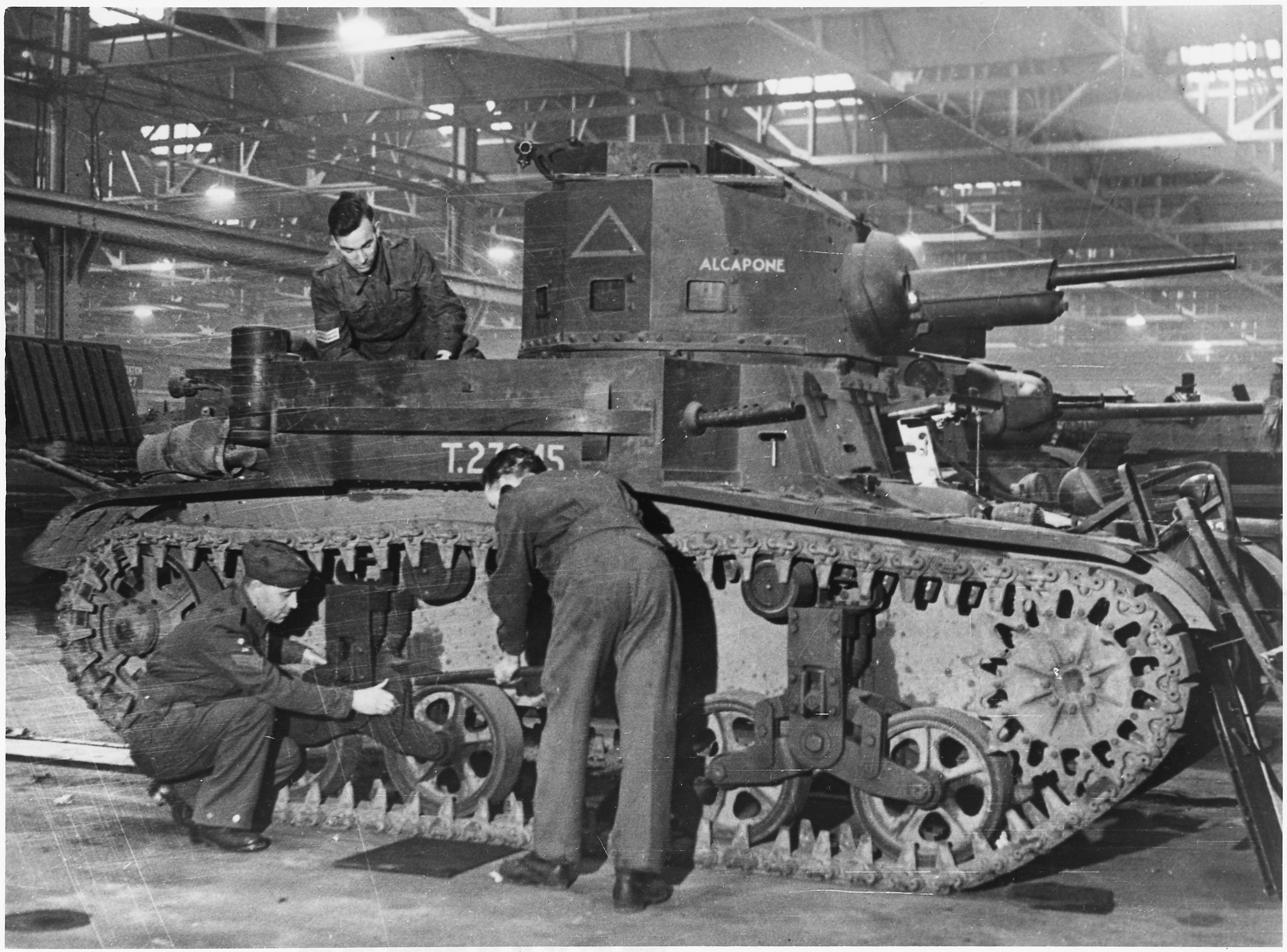
An American M2 Light Tank using the vertical volute spring system. The springs are just visible behind the rectangular covers.

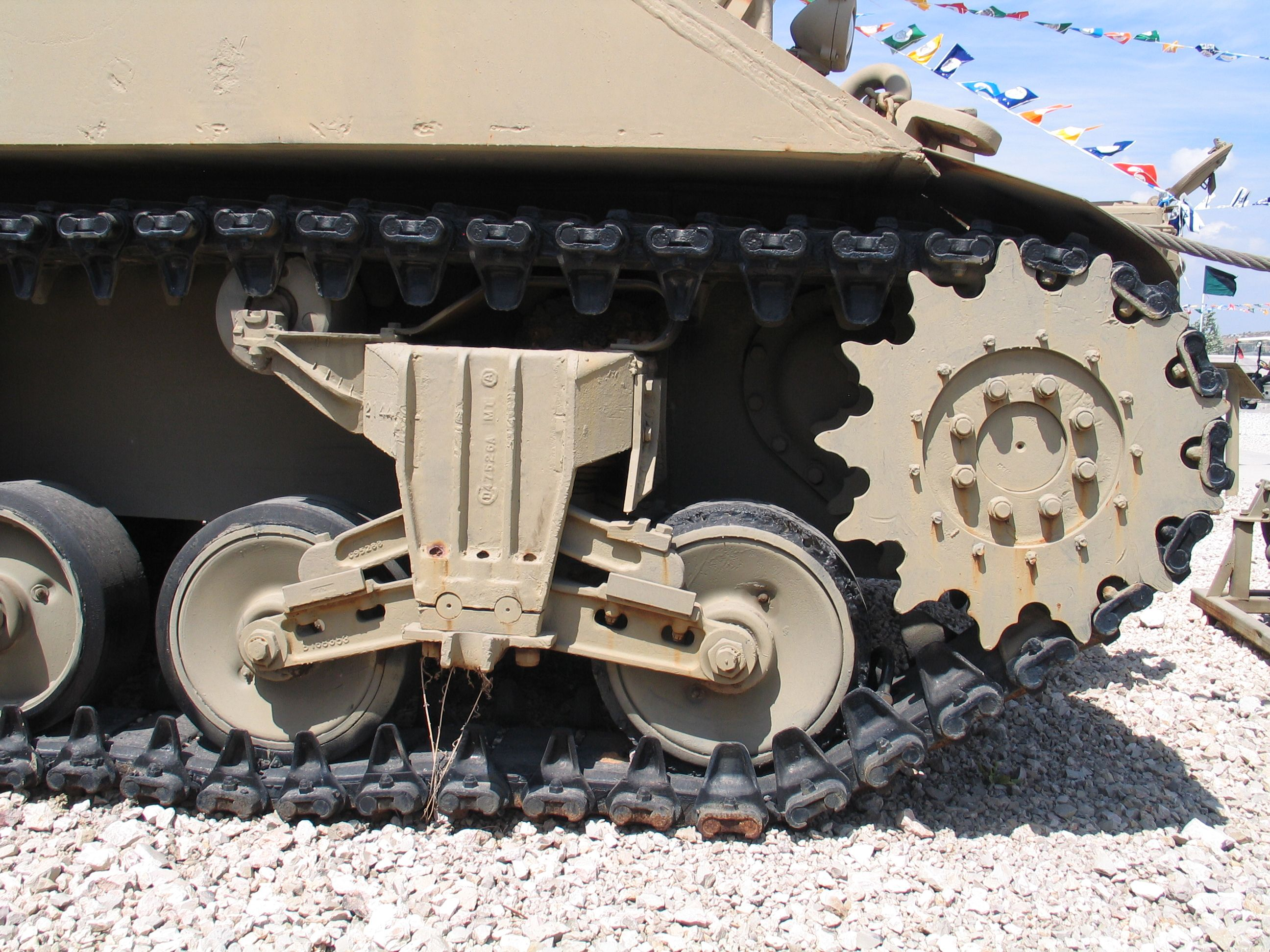
The VVSS system of an M32 Tank Recovery Vehicle (ARV) on display at the Yad La-Shiryon military museum in Latrun in Israel.

During the 1930s, many innovations in the components of light tanks would make US tanks considerably more reliable. These included rubber-bushed tracks, rear mounted radial engines and the vertical volute spring suspension.

A volute spring is a compression spring in the form of a cone (a volute). Under compression, the coils slide over each other, affording a long travel. The result is more stable and powerful than any leaf, coil, or torsion bar spring in the same volume. Mounted vertically in a road wheel bogie for a pair of road wheels on a tank made a very compact unit.

The suspension was developed in 1933 by Harry Knox, better known for his Knox Automobile Company, and was first tested on the T2E1 light tank prototype in 1934.

The Rock Island Arsenal produced a small tank for the cavalry that used vertical volute spring suspension instead of leaf spring suspension. Standardized as the M1 Combat Car, it entered service with the US Army in 1937. The design was used in the M2 light tank and subsequent Stuart tank series. Design features of the Stuart were scaled up for use in the first M2 medium tanks, which would evolve into the more successful M3 Lee and M4 Sherman, all using the VVSS.

== Replacement ==
Battle experience showed that the service life of the original vertical volute spring suspension (VVSS) of the late model M4 was shortening due to the tank's increasing combat weight with larger guns and heavier armor. Beginning in mid-1944, M4A3 models of the Sherman adopted a newly developed Horizontal Volute Spring Suspension (HVSS).

=== Horizontal volute spring suspension ===
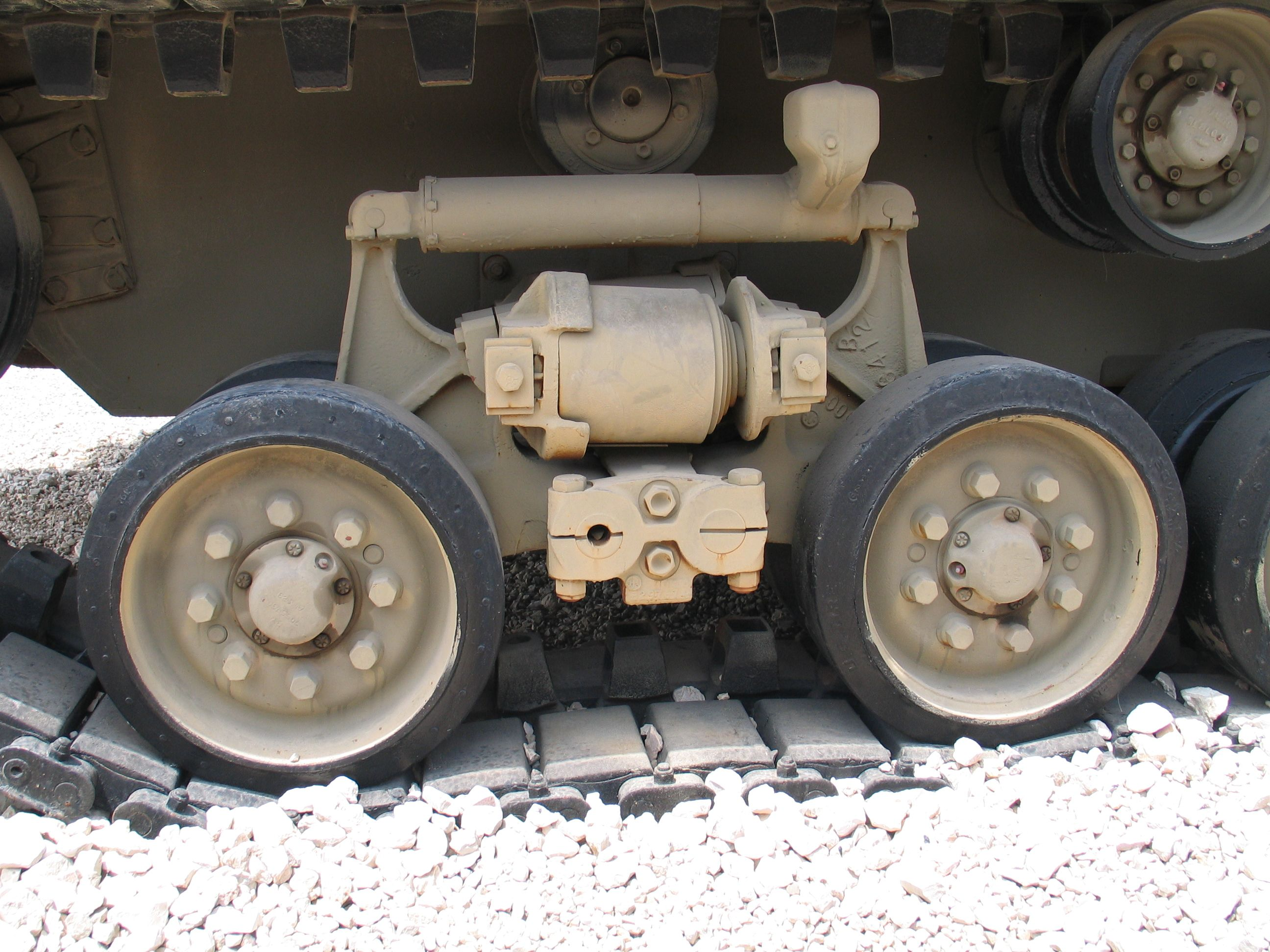
The HVSS system of an Israeli M51 Super Sherman tank.

This type of a suspension system involved springing the pair of dual-mounted road wheels on each bogie against each other with a volute spring. First tried by Harry Knox on the Light Tank T6 project in 1938, it was essentially a version of the British Horstmann suspension that replaced the Horstmann's coil spring with a pair of volute springs.

When the horizontally-affixed volute springs were placed in compression by either the front or the rear bogie wheel arm, the pressure from the load was transmitted onto the opposite arm, thus helping to maintain tension on the tracks. Compared to the VVSS system, which it replaced on the M4, the HVSS system was heavier and stronger and allowed the changing of individual wheels aside from increasing wheel travel space.

== See also ==
- Christie suspension – Suspension system used in early tanks
- Horstmann suspension – Type of tracked vehicle suspension
- Torsion bar suspension – Vehicle suspension that uses a torsion bar
- Continuous track – System of vehicle propulsion

== Bibliography ==
- United States Army Materiel Command (1963). "Chapter 11: The Suspension System". The Automotive Assembly: Research and Development of Materiel. Vol. 3. U.S. Government Printing Office.
- Xu, Guoying; Xue, Dabing; Wang, Tao (2017). Development and main research status of tracked vehicle suspension system (PDF). Advances in Engineering Research. Vol. 138. Academy of Armored Force Engineering.
- Merhof, Wolfgang; Hackbarth, Ernst-Michael (2015). Fahrmechanik der Kettenfahrzeuge (Driving mechanics of tracked vehicles) (PDF). Universität der Bundeswehr, Universitätsbibliothek. ISBN 978-3-943207-13-2.
