= M2 half-track car =

M2 half-track
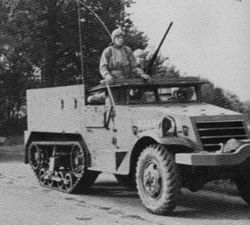
- US
- Type: Half-track artillery tractor/reconnaissance vehicle
- Place of origin: United States

Service history
- Used by: See Former operators
- Wars: World War II; First Indochina War; Cambodian Civil War; Nicaraguan Revolution

Production history
- Designer: Firestone Defense Division

Specifications
- Mass: 9 metric tons
- Length: 5.96 m (19 ft 7 in)
- Width: 2.2 m (7 ft 3 in)
- Height: 2.26 m (7 ft 5 in)
- Crew: 2
- Passengers: 7
- Armor: 6–12 mm
- Main armament: 0.5 inch M2 Browning heavy machine gun
- Secondary armament: 14 mines, 10 hand grenades
- Engine: 386 cu in (6.33 L) White 160AX inline six 148 hp (110 kW; 150 PS)
- Suspension: Wheeled front axle, rear track
- Operational range: 220 mi (350 km) (average)
- Maximum speed: 45 mph (72 km/h)

The M2 half-track car was an armored half-track produced by the United States during World War II. Its design drew upon half-tracks imported from France in the 1930s, employing standard components supplied by U.S. truck manufacturers to speed production and reduce costs. The concept was designed, and the pilot models manufactured by the Firestone Tire and Rubber Company (before the prototype was officially labeled M2.) Production by the White Motor Company began in 1940 and was expanded to include Autocar.

The M2 was initially intended for use as an artillery tractor, but also found use with reconnaissance units. International Harvester Company built the M9 half-track, a variant of their M5 half track, to fulfill the same purpose. It saw wide use in World War II, chiefly by the United States, but also by its allies. A few legacy units were used in the Nicaraguan Revolution.

== History ==
The concept of a half-track vehicle had been evaluated by the US Army Ordnance Department using Citroën-Kégresse vehicles.

The Cavalry branch of the US Army found that their wheeled armored scout cars had trouble in wet terrain due to their high ground pressure.

In 1938, the White Motor Company took the Timken rear bogie assembly from a T9 half-track truck and added it to an M3 scout car, creating the T7 half-track car. This vehicle was significantly underpowered. When a further requirement came down from US Army artillery units in 1939 for a prime mover to be used as an artillery tractor, a vehicle with an uprated engine was developed, which was designated the half-track scout car T14.

By 1940, the vehicle had been standardized as the M2 half-track car. The M2 design was recognized as having the potential for use by mechanized infantry, which spawned the larger-bodied M3 half-track. Both the M2 and M3 were ordered into production in late 1940, with M2 contracts let to Autocar, White and Diamond T. The first vehicles were received by the Army in 1941.

The M2 was supplied to armored artillery units as the prime mover and ammunition carrier for the 105mm howitzer, and to armored infantry units for carrying machine gun squads. It was also issued to armored reconnaissance units as an interim solution until more specialized vehicles could be fielded.

Between 1942 and 1943, both the M2 and M3 would receive a number of modifications to the drive train, engine, and stowage, among other upgrades.

Total production of M2 and derivatives by White was about 13,500 units. To meet the needs of Lend-Lease to the Allies, the International Harvester Company produced 3,500 units of the M9. The M9 was the same as the IH-produced M5 but with different internal stowage and apart from using IH mechanical components the M9 was longer than the M2.

== Use ==
The first M2s were fielded in 1941, and would be used in the Philippines, North Africa, and Europe by the U.S. Army, and around the Pacific by the Marines. About 800 M2 and M9 half-tracks were sent to the Soviet Union. Many remaining vehicles initially destined for Lend-Lease were transferred to other U.S. allies, primarily in South America. These vehicles often received a number of upgrades designed at extending service life. The Nicaraguan National Guard received 10 M2s in 1942, which saw heavy action during the 1978-79 Nicaraguan Revolution. The Argentine Army retired its last upgraded M9 in 2006 and donated them to Bolivia.

In 1947, the Finnish heavy vehicle producer Vanajan Autotehdas bought 425 M2 half-track vehicles from the Western Allied surplus stocks located in France and Germany. The vehicles were delivered without armor. Some 359 units were converted into field and forest clearing vehicles, some were scrapped for parts and 60 units were equipped with conventional rear axles and converted into 4×4 or 4×2 trucks. They were badged as Vanaja VaWh. The last units were sold in 1952.

== Former operators ==
- Argentina
- Belgium
- Brazil
- Cambodia
- Chile
- Czechoslovakia
- Finland
- France - used during the First Indochina War
- Greece
- Israel
- Mexico
- Netherlands
- Nicaragua – 10 M2s in service with the National Guard of Nicaragua in 1979.
- Paraguay – 23 still in service.
- Philippines
- Poland
- Portugal
- South Vietnam
- Soviet Union
- United Kingdom
- United States

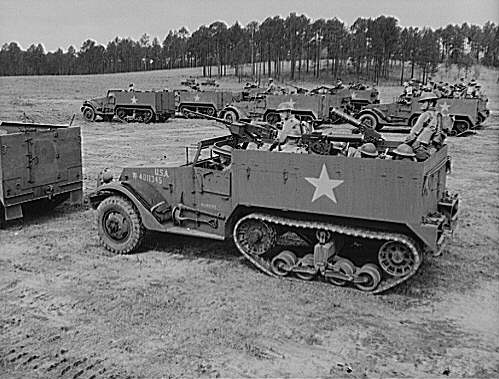
M2 at Fort Benning, Georgia, 1942. Note the shorter hull compared to the M3s (left and background) and hinged doors of ammunition compartments in the side armor.

== Variants ==
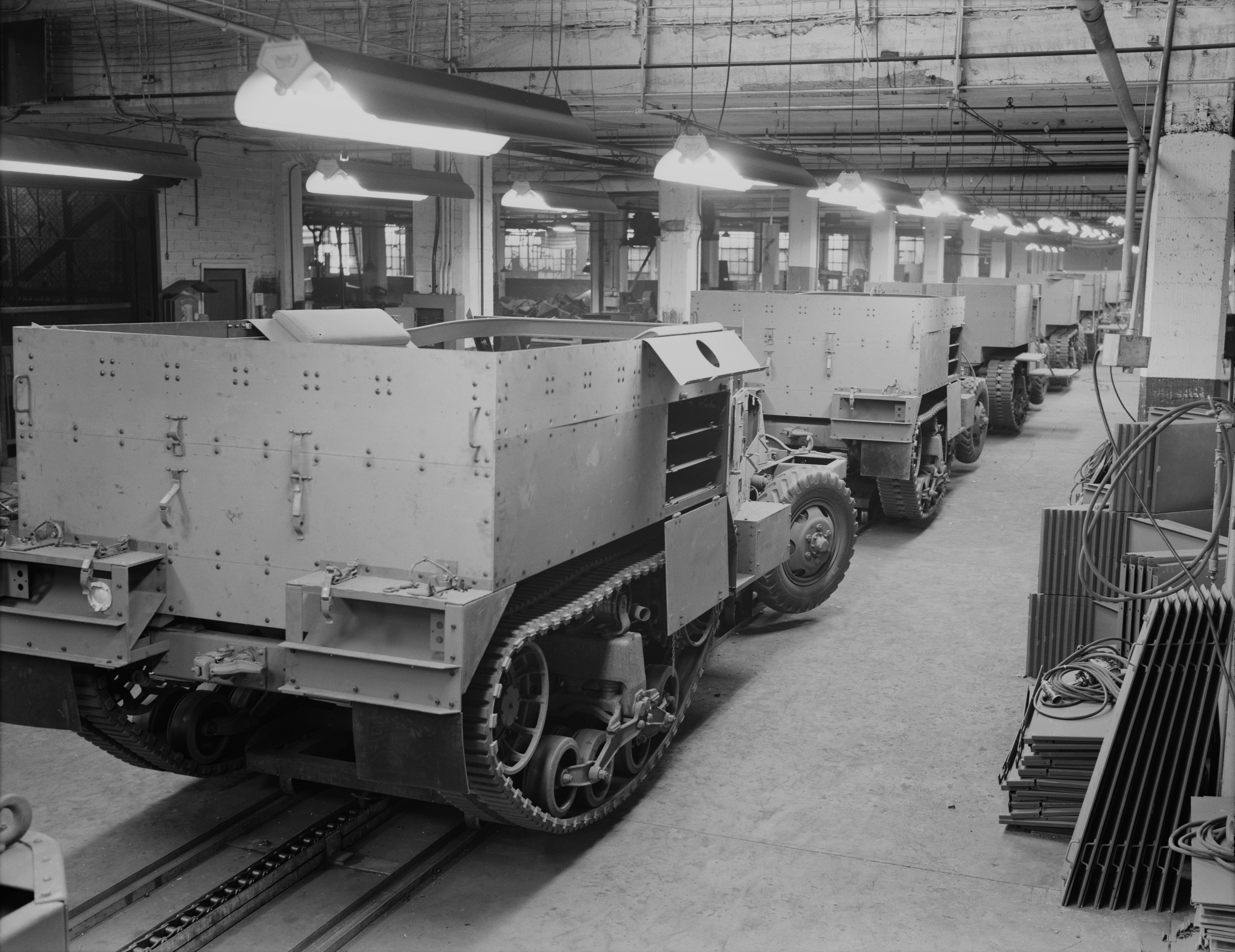
Partly finished M2s travel along an assembly line.

=== Prime mover/scout vehicle ===
M2
White half-track with White 160AX engine. Fitted with a skate rail mount, featuring an M2HB machine gun.
M2E6/M2A1
Any vehicle with the improved M49 machine gun ring mount over the right hand front seat. Three fixed pintle mounts for 0.30 machine guns were often fitted at the unit level in the field.

M9
International Harvester built half-track, developed to complement the M2 for Lend-Lease, but using the large hull of the M5. Also, it did not feature the rear access doors, and is outwardly very similar to the M5, but with a different internal configuration. The M9A1 was an M9 with the M49 machine gun mount and a rear door.

=== Self-propelled guns ===
M4/M4A1 81mm MMC
M2 based motor mortar carriage equipped with the 81 mm M1 mortar. The mortar was intended to be fired dismounted from the vehicle, but could be fired in an emergency to the rear from a base inside the vehicle. The A1 modification allowed the weapon to be fixed facing forward and fired from within the vehicle.
M2 w/ M3 37 mm
Mechanized infantry units in the US Army were supposed to receive the M6 gun motor carriage, based on Dodge light trucks. With the overall failure in combat of these vehicles, some units removed the M3 37 mm guns and their assemblies and mounted them on M2 half-track cars.

=== Anti-aircraft variants ===
Multiple gun motor carriage T1E1
M2 based mobile anti-aircraft gun featuring an open rear with a Bendix mount featuring two .50 inch (12.7 mm) M2 machine guns. The Bendix mount proved to be unsatisfactory. Prototype only.
MGMC T1E2
As T1E1 with Maxson M33 mount in the place of the Bendix mount. The M33 mount also featured two .50 inch M2 machine guns. Would be developed into the M3 based T1E4. The T1E2 was rebuilt as the T61 with Maxson quad turret.
MGMC T1E3
M2 fitted with a partial hard top and a Martin turret, identical to that used on the Boeing B-17 Flying Fortress. Proved to be overcomplicated and was ill-suited to the space available in the M2. Prototype only.
T28 CGMC
M2 based combination gun motor carriage with a single 37 mm gun M1A2 autocannon flanked by two .50 inch M2 machine guns. The side armor was removed in order to make room for the mount. The project was canceled in 1942 but then revived the same year, when a decision was made to use the longer M3 half-track personnel carrier chassis for the subsequent T28E1

== See also ==
- List of U.S. military vehicles by supply catalog designation
- List of U.S. military vehicles by model number
