= M3 half-track =

US military vehicle

Carrier, Personnel, Half-track, M3
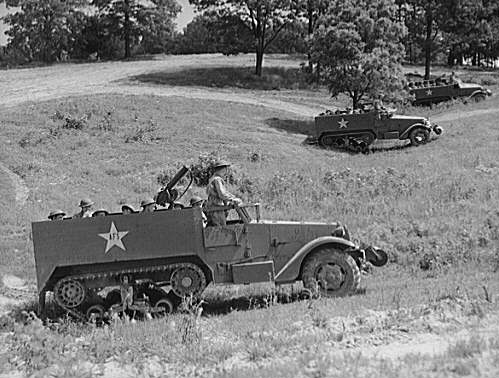
- Three M3 half-tracks at Fort Knox
- Type: Half-track armored personnel carrier
- Place of origin: United States

Service history
- Wars: World War II; Chinese Civil War; 1948 Arab–Israeli War; Greek Civil War; Korean War; First Indochina War; Costa Rican Civil War; Vietnam War; Laotian Civil War; Algerian War; Cambodian Civil War; Suez Crisis; 1958 Lebanon crisis Six-Day War; 1973 Arab–Israeli War; Lebanese Civil War; Salvadoran Civil War; Nicaraguan Revolution

Production history
- Designed: 1940–1941
- Manufacturer: Autocar; Diamond T White Motor Company
- Unit cost: $10,310
- Produced: 1941-1945
- No. built: 53,000 (including variants)

Specifications
- Mass: 17,650 pounds (8.01 t) (M3), 18,425 pounds (8.357 t) (M3A1)
- Length: 20 ft 3 in (6.17 m) with roller
- Width: 7 ft 3.5 in (2.223 m)
- Height: 7 ft 5 in (2.26 m)
- Crew: 1
- Passengers: 12
- Armor: 6–12 mm (0.25–0.50 in)
- Main armament: .30 caliber Browning M1919A4 machine gun (M3, M3A1),.50 caliber Browning M2HB machine gun (M3A1)
- Engine: White 160AX; 148 hp (110 kW) at 3,000 rpm
- Power/weight: 18.5 hp/metric ton (M3), 17.7 hp/metric ton (M3A1)
- Transmission: Spicer 3461 constant mesh
- Suspension: Front: semi-elliptic longitudinal leaf spring Rear: Vertical volute spring
- Fuel capacity: 60 US gallons (230 litres)
- Operational range: 200 mi (320 km)
- Maximum speed: 45 mph (72 km/h) on road

The M3 half-track is an American armored personnel carrier half-track widely used by the Allies during World War II and in the Cold War. Derived from the M2 half-track car, the M3 was extensively produced, with about 15,000 standard M3s and more than 38,000 variant units manufactured.

The M3 was extensively modified with several dozen variant designs produced for different purposes. During World War II, the M3 and its variants were supplied to the U.S. Army and Marines, as well as British Commonwealth and Soviet Red Army forces, serving on all major fronts throughout the war. The M3 and its variants were produced by many manufacturers including Diamond T, White Motor Company, and Autocar. They were adapted for a wide variety of uses, such as a self-propelled anti-aircraft weapon or self-propelled artillery. Although initially unpopular due to its lack of significant armor or a roof to protect the passengers and crew from shrapnel, it was used by most of the Allies during the war.

In the Cold War era, the vehicle was used by a variety of state and non-state operators in conflicts in South America, the Middle East, Africa, and Asia, remaining in service until as late as the mid-1990s.

== Specifications ==
The M3 half-track was 20 ft 3 in (6.17 m) long, 7 ft 3.5 in (2.223 m) wide, 7 ft 5 in (2.26 m) high and had a gross weight of either 17,650 pounds (8.01 t) (M3) or 18,425 pounds (8.357 t) (M3A1). The wheelbase was 135.5 in (3.44 m) long. The suspension consists of a leaf spring for the two front wheels, while the rear treads had vertical volute springs. With a fuel capacity of 60 US gallons (230 L), the M3 could carry its crew (one driver) and a squad of 12 soldiers 220 miles (350 km) before refueling, while protecting them from small arms with light armor (6–12 mm of armor). The vehicle was powered by a 148 hp (110 kW) White 160AX, 386 in^{3} (6,330 cc), 6-cylinder gasoline engine.

== Design ==
The design, which used many commercial components to improve reliability and the rate of production, was standardized in 1940 and built by the Autocar Company, Diamond T Motor Company, and the White Motor Company. With a White 160AX engine, the M3 was driven through a manual constant-mesh (non-synchromesh) transmission with four forward and one reverse gear, as well as a two-speed transfer case. Braking was hydraulic assisted while steering was manual. Onboard electronics run on a 12-volt system. The vehicle uses two tracks made of molded rubber over steel cabling with metal track guides.

Infantry rifles were held in brackets behind the seats while ammunition and rations were generally stored underneath. In 1942, the vehicles were fitted with small racks for land mines on the outside of the hull, just above the tracks. In combat, many squads found it necessary to stow additional rations, rucksacks and other crew stowage on the outside of the vehicle. Luggage racks were often added in the field, and later vehicles were fitted with rear-mounted racks for this purpose.

Early vehicles had a pintle mount just behind the front seats that mounted a .50-caliber (12.7 mm) M2 Browning machine gun. The later M3A1 adopted a raised, armored "pulpit" mount for the .50-caliber machine gun over the front passenger seat, and additional mounts for .30-caliber (7.62 mm) machine guns along the sides of the passenger compartment. Many M3s were later converted to M3A1s. The vehicle body was fully armored, with an adjustable armored shutter for the engine radiator, and adjustable bulletproof panels with vision slits for the windshield, driver windows, and passenger windows.

== Development ==
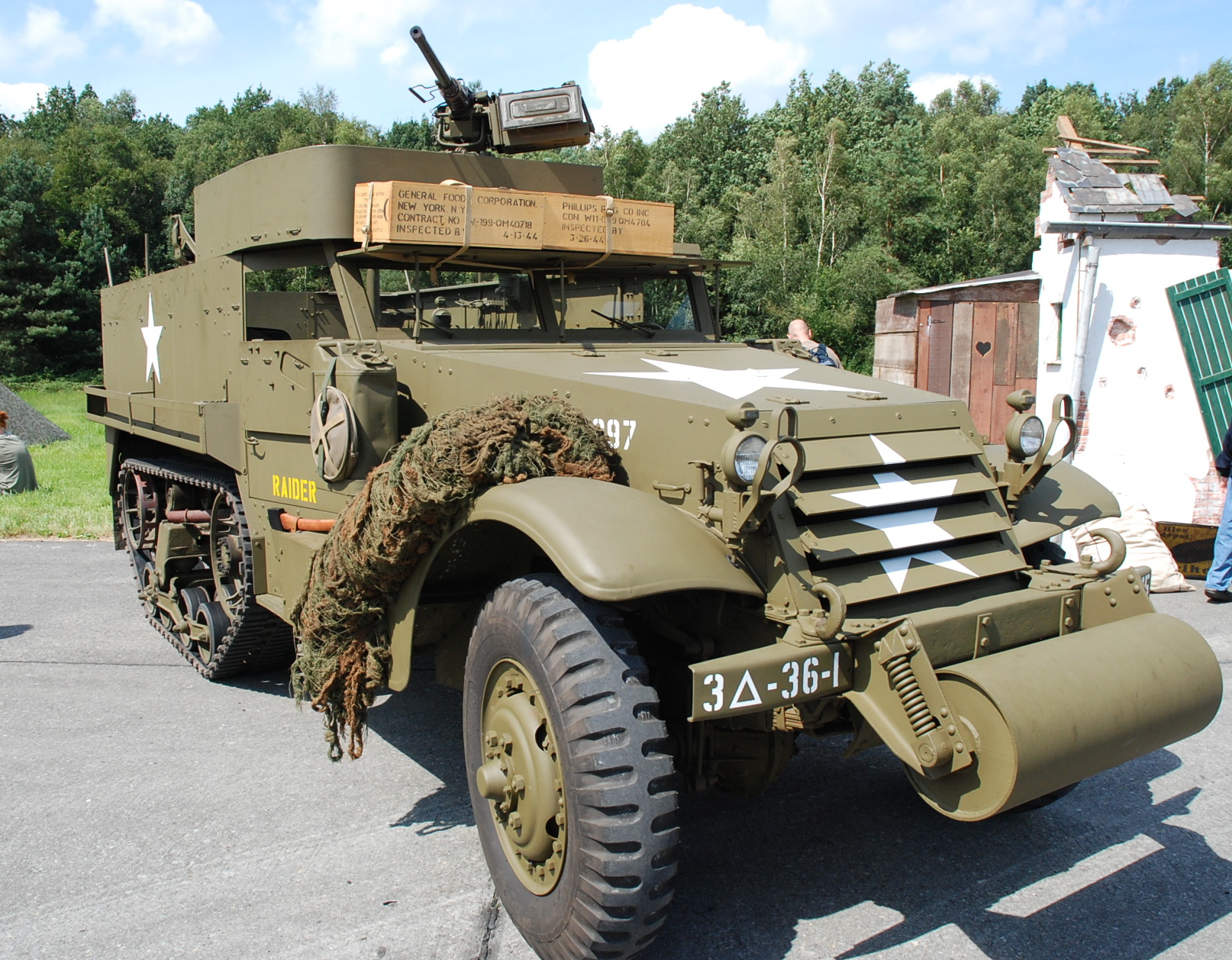
On display in Ursel (Northwest of Ghent), Belgium

The development of an armored half-track began with ordnance directive OCM 14188 to convert an M3 Scout Car into a half-track. The prototype was built at Rock Island Arsenal with help from White Motor Company and was designated the T7. It had the same chassis and engine as the M3, but had larger front wheels and a shorter front clip. The armor consisted of 1/4-inch thick hardened armor plate, and it was armed with two M1919 machine guns and one M2 Browning machine gun operated by a crew of eight. Tests at Aberdeen Proving Ground in 1938 demonstrated unsatisfactory performance due to the front-wheel drive. The T7 was converted back into a scout car and returned to the Army.

Throughout 1939 and 1940, the M2 half-track car was prototyped and developed by the Army at Aberdeen Proving Grounds. The M3 was developed as a larger version of the M2 equipped with two M1919 machine guns and an M2 Browning machine gun for combat usage. The M3 also added a rear door and five additional seats in the rear. The M3 was tested at Aberdeen Proving Grounds in the summer of 1941 and was accepted into service soon after.

== Service history ==
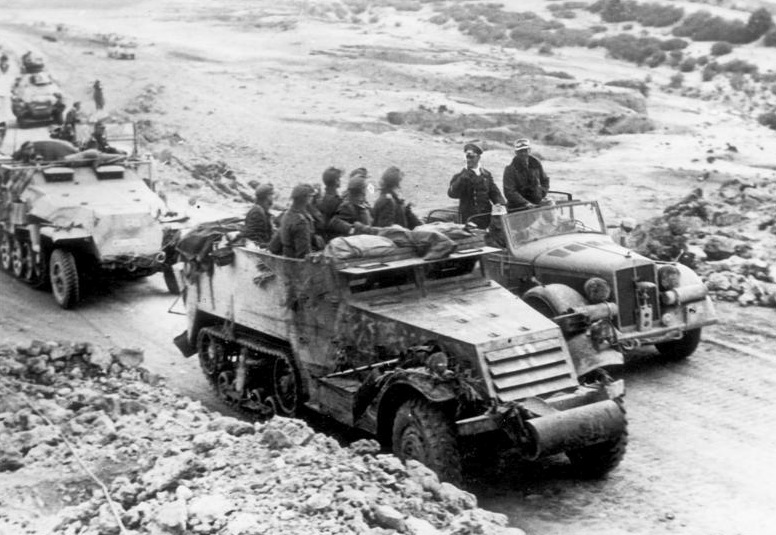
Rommel in Tunisia speaking with troops riding a captured American built M3 half-track during Battle of Kasserine Pass.

In US service, it was intended that the M3 would be issued to armored infantry regiments. It was also quickly put into action with the Provisional Tank Group when the Japanese Army began their invasion of the Philippines. At first, there were multiple complaints due to several mechanical difficulties. These were rectified by the Ordnance Department after receiving field reports from the Philippines. The M3s first use in its intended role was during Operation Torch. Each armored division had 433 M2s or M3s, 200 in the armored regiments and 233 in the armored infantry regiment.

The half-tracks were initially unpopular and nicknamed "Purple Heart boxes" (a grim reference to the US Army decoration for combat wounds) by American troops. The chief complaints centered on the complete lack of overhead protection from artillery shells bursting overhead and that the armor was inadequate against machine gun fire. Omar Bradley quoted in his report about half-tracks that it was "a competent and dependable contrivance. Its bad name resulted from the inexperience of our troops who attempted to use it for too many things". Another major issue with the M3 was its fixed rear idler, which often broke on rough terrain. Commanders in North Africa bought parts to build spring-loaded rear idlers that could handle the rough terrain, which the Ordnance Department then approved as an official fix. In 1943, the M3 served in Sicily and Italy and received positive reports of it in action. It operated in Operation Overlord and served in Europe for the remainder of the war.

The vehicle was generally considered very mechanically reliable, although there were two major complaints: the vehicle had a wide turning radius and lacked power steering, the latter especially evident when using narrow European streets. The unique design of the track, made up of steel bands with a rubber contact surface vulcanized to them, made replacement difficult; if the track became damaged or the steel bands stretched out, the entire track had to be replaced. A track with replaceable blocks was suggested as an alternative.

Total production of the M3 and its variants ran to nearly 54,000 vehicles. To supply the Allied nations, International Harvester produced several thousand of a very similar vehicle, the M5 half-track, for Lend-Lease.

== Variants ==
=== Armored personnel carriers ===
- M3 – White and Autocar half-track with White 386 in^{3} (6,330 cc) 160AX engine. Fitted with either an M32 anti-aircraft machine gun mount or a pedestal mount, both featuring an M2HB machine gun.
  - M3A1 – A M3 with the improved M49 machine gun ring mount over the right hand front seat. Between 1942 and 1943 all M3 half-tracks (standard and A1s) were continually upgraded. These improvements included a number of drive train, engine, and stowage improvements.
  - T29/M3A2 – Developed in 1943 to combine features such that existing M2 and M3 production could be switched to a common vehicle. The need for additional half-tracks was not as large as predicted, and the M3A2 was never built.
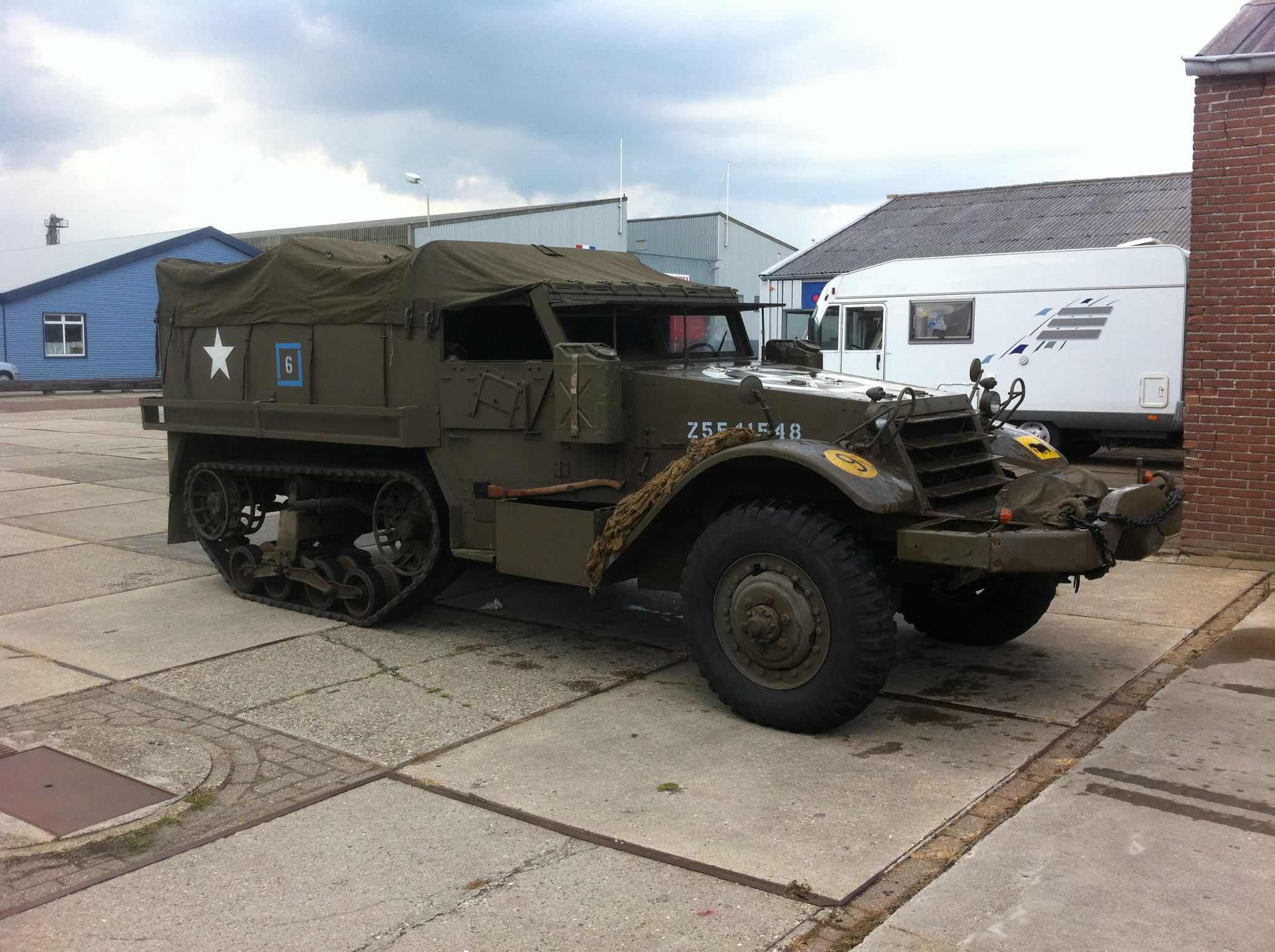
- The M5 personnel carrier
  M3E2/M5 half-track – International Harvester half-track, externally largely identical to the M3, but with 450 in^{3} (7,400 cc), IHC RED-450-B engine, different drive train and fuel and electrical system. The chassis, bogies, track, idler and drive sprockets, wheels, winches, transfer case, rollers, and machine gun mount are interchangeable with the M3. The M5 was heavier than the M3, due in part to heavier armor. The body of the vehicle was welded, rather than bolted. The M5 was primarily built for Lend-Lease to the European allies.
  - M5A1 – Similar to the M3A1, the M5A1 was an M5 with the M49 machine gun mount. It could fit one .50-caliber (12.7 mm) and two .30-caliber (30.06) machine guns. The IHC models had a slightly lower top speed (only 42 mph (68 km/h)) and lower range (125 mi (201 km)).
  - T31/M5A2 – Similar in principle to the M3A2, the M5A2 was a vehicle developed by the US Ordnance Department to combine the production of the M5 and M9 into a single vehicle. As with the M3A2, the project was never needed, and was never produced.
  - M9 half-track – Same body as the M5, but with stowage arranged as in the M2 half-track car, access to radios from inside (as opposed to outside) and rear doors, plus an pedestal MG mount.
  - M9A1 – Same as M9, with ring mount and three MG pintles.

=== Self-propelled guns ===
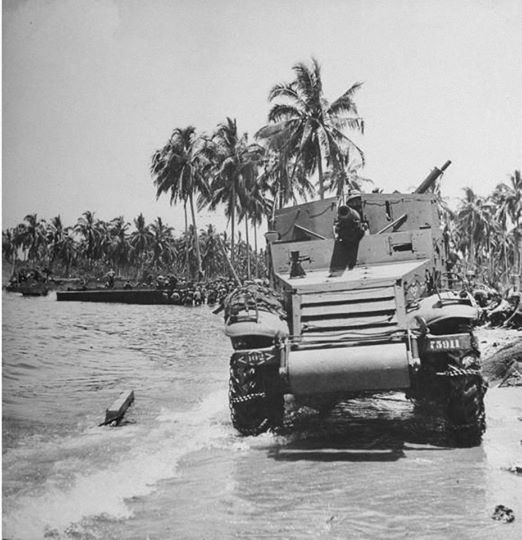
A M3 GMC on the Bougainville Island, in the Solomon Islands, November 1943

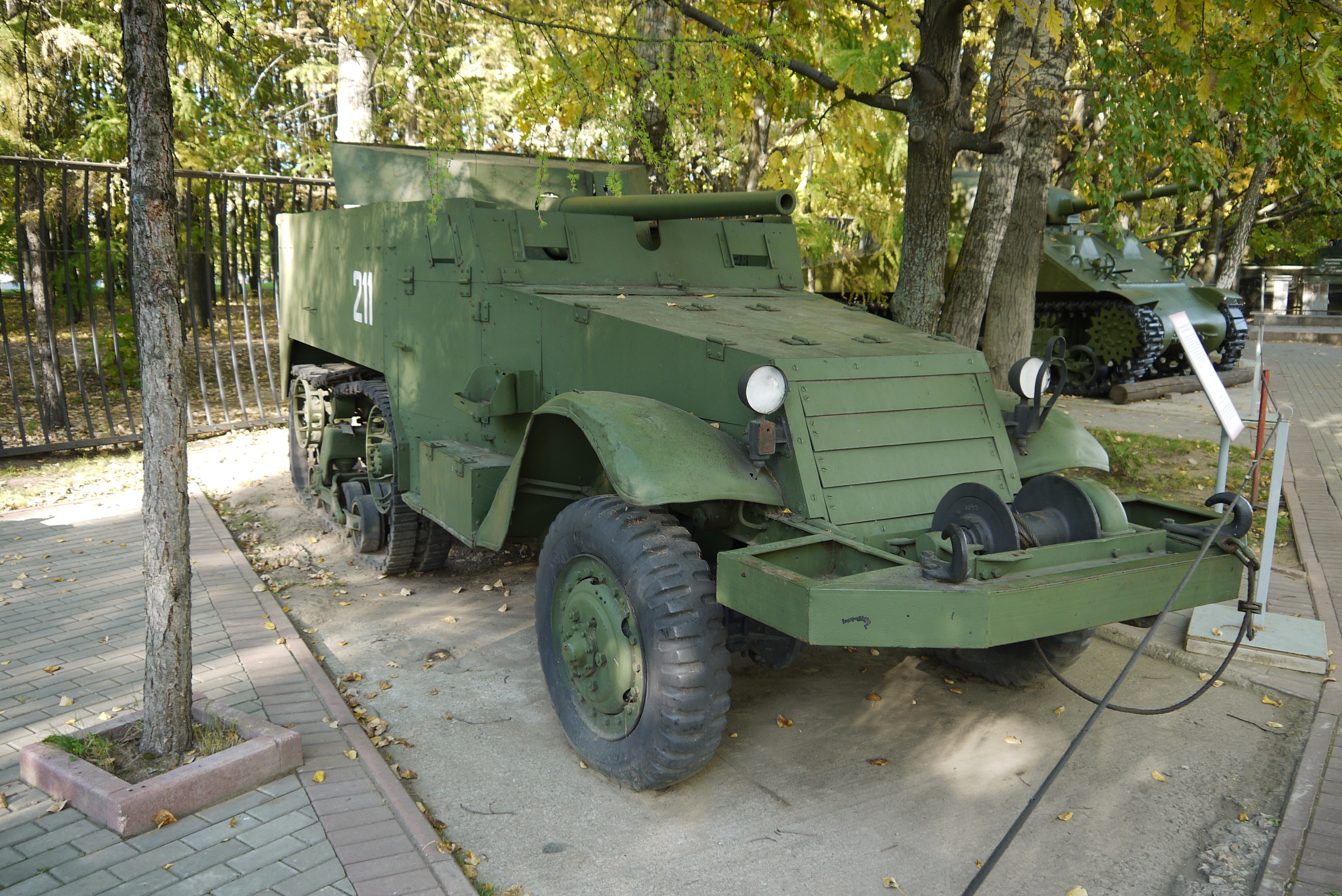
A T48 57 mm GMC / SU-57 in the Museum of the Great Patriotic War, Poklonnaya Hill Victory Park

- T12/M3 75 mm GMC – M3 based gun motor carriage equipped with the M1897A5 75 mm gun. Also fitted with the M2A3 gun carriage and shield.
  - M3A1 75 mm GMC – The M2A2 gun carriage was substituted for the A3, as stocks of the former were exhausted. Later variants featured a purpose-built gun shield (59 rounds).
- T19 105 mm HMC – M3 based howitzer motor carriage equipped with the M2A1 105 mm howitzer (8 rounds).
- T19/M21 81 mm MMC – M3-based mortar motor carriage equipped with the M1 mortar (81 mm) (97 rounds), designed to allow the mortar to be fired from within the vehicle.
- T21 – M3 based mortar carrier fitted with a 4.2 inch mortar. Never adopted.
  - T21E1 – The T21's mortar could only fire rearward as with the M2 based M4 MMC. The T21E1 reoriented to the mortar to fire forward.
- T30 75 mm HMC – M3 based howitzer motor carriage equipped with the M1A1 75 mm howitzer in a simple box mount (60 rounds). Used by the US Army. Also provided to the Free French Army, later used in Indochina.
- T38 105 mm HMC – M3 based howitzer motor carriage equipped with the M3 105 mm howitzer. Cancelled with the success of the T19 105 mm HMC.
- T48 gun motor carriage – M3 based gun motor carriage equipped with the M1 57 mm gun, an American copy of the British QF 6 pounder anti-tank gun. A total of 962 T48s were produced during the war. Of these, 60 were supplied under lend lease to Britain, and 650 to the USSR who designated it SU-57 (99 rounds). A total of 31 were converted into M3A1s, while one entered service with the U.S. Army.

=== Anti-aircraft variants ===
- T1E4/M13 half-track – M3 based multiple gun motor carriage equipped with the Maxson M33 mount with two M2HB machine guns (5,000 rounds). The T1E4 prototypes had the hull sides removed for ease of working with the mount. These were reintroduced on production M13s. This was a development of previous T1s that had all been based on the M2 half-track car.
  - M14 half-track – M13 MGMC variant, based on the M5 chassis. Supplied under lend-lease to Britain (5,000 rounds).

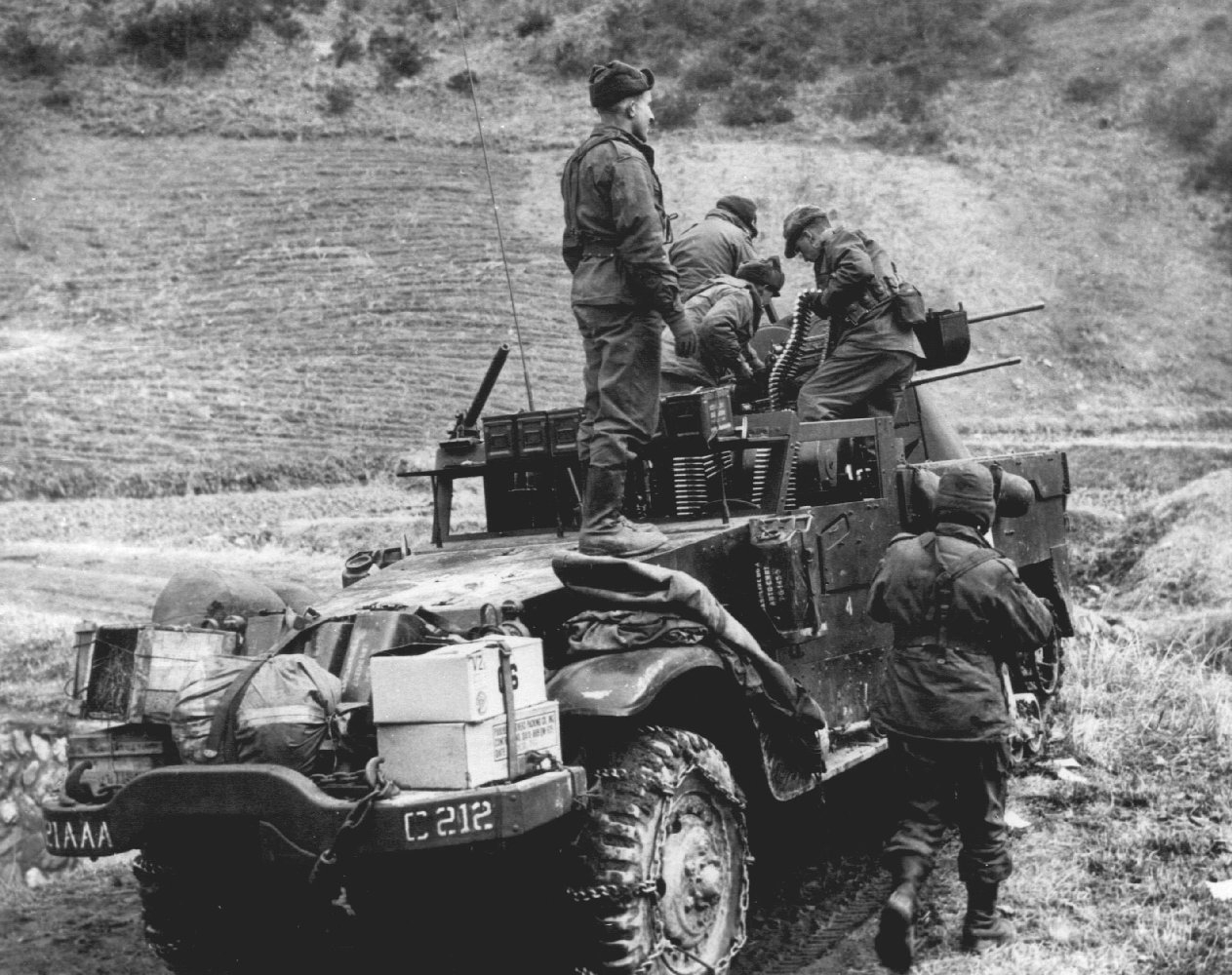
An M16 MGMC in action in Korea, 1953

- M16 half-track – M3 based multiple gun motor carriage equipped with the Maxson M45 Quadmount (specifically the M45D) with four M2HB machine guns (5,000 rounds).
  - M16A1 MGMC – Standard M3 personnel carriers converted to multiple gun motor carriages by removing rear seats and installing a Maxson M45 mount (more specifically the M45F, which featured folding "bat wing" gun shields on both sides of the mount over the machine guns). These vehicles are easily identified by the lack of the folding armored hull panels found on purpose-built M16s.
  - M16A2 MGMC – M16s converted to add the improvements of the M16A1 and with the addition of a rear door to the hull compartment. For existing M16s, this essentially meant a replacement of the M45D mount for the M45F mount.
  - M17 half-track – M16 MGMC variant with the M5 chassis. Sent under lend-lease to USSR (5,000 rounds).
- T58 – Similar to the M16/M17, the T58 featured the Maxon quad-mount fitted to a special electric powered turret. Prototype only.
- T28E1 CGMC – M3 based combination gun motor carriage equipped with one M1A2 37 mm autocannon (240 rounds) flanked by 2 M2WC machine guns (3,400 rounds). The original T28 was built on the M2 half-track car chassis. Prototype only.
  - M15 half-track – T28E1 variant, equipped with an armored superstructure on the turreted mount to provide crew protection, and switched to M2HB machine guns.
  - M15A1 CGMC – Reorganization of the weapons, with the M2HB machine guns being fitted under the M1A2 37 mm autocannon instead of above.
- T10E1 – Variant to test the feasibility of mounting US made copies of the Hispano-Suiza HS.404 20 mm cannon on modified Maxson mounts. All were later rebuilt as M16s. The original T10 was based on the M2 half-track car chassis.

==== 40 mm experiments ====
Various attempts were made to mate the 40 mm Bofors L/50 gun to the M3 chassis. In most cases the weapon's recoil was too severe or the mounting too heavy, and the attempts were finally stopped with the adoption of the M19 MGMC on the M24 light tank chassis.

- T54/E1 – Tested in 1942, the gun mount quickly proved to be unstable when fired, and the improved T54E1, which also added a circular armored shield and rear armor to the vehicle, could not fix the inherent problem. Prototype only.
- T59 – A development of the T54/E1, fitted with outriggers to help stabilize the vehicle during sustained firing. Still proved to be too unstable for anti-aircraft use. Prototype only.
  - T59E1 – T59 fitted with the T17 fire control system. Prototype only.
- T60/E1 – Similar to the T54 and the T59, but featured two .50 caliber M2 machine guns flanking the 40 mm cannon (the mounting's designation was T65). The T60E1 featured an armor configuration similar to that of the T54E1. Suffered from the same stability issues as previous attempts. Prototype only.
- T68 – Perhaps the most radical of the experiments, the T68 featured two 40 mm cannons, one mounted on top of the other, plus a stabilizer on top of the two guns. The recoil force proved to be too much for the mount, and the idea was abandoned. Prototype only.
- M15 "Special" – Field conversions by US Army depots in Australia of standard M3s, not M15s, fitted with turreted 40 mm Bofors L/50 guns. These were the only successful mating of this weapon to the M3 chassis, and were used more for direct fire support than for anti-aircraft purposes.
- M34 – Like the M15 "Special" above, 102 M15s were converted to M34s in Japan in 1951. The M34 mounted a single 40 mm Bofors gun in place of the M15's combination gun mount. This was due primarily to a shortage of 37 mm ammunition, which was no longer manufactured. M34s served with at least two AAA (automatic weapons) battalions (the 26th and 140th) in the Korean War.

=== Post-war Israeli variants ===
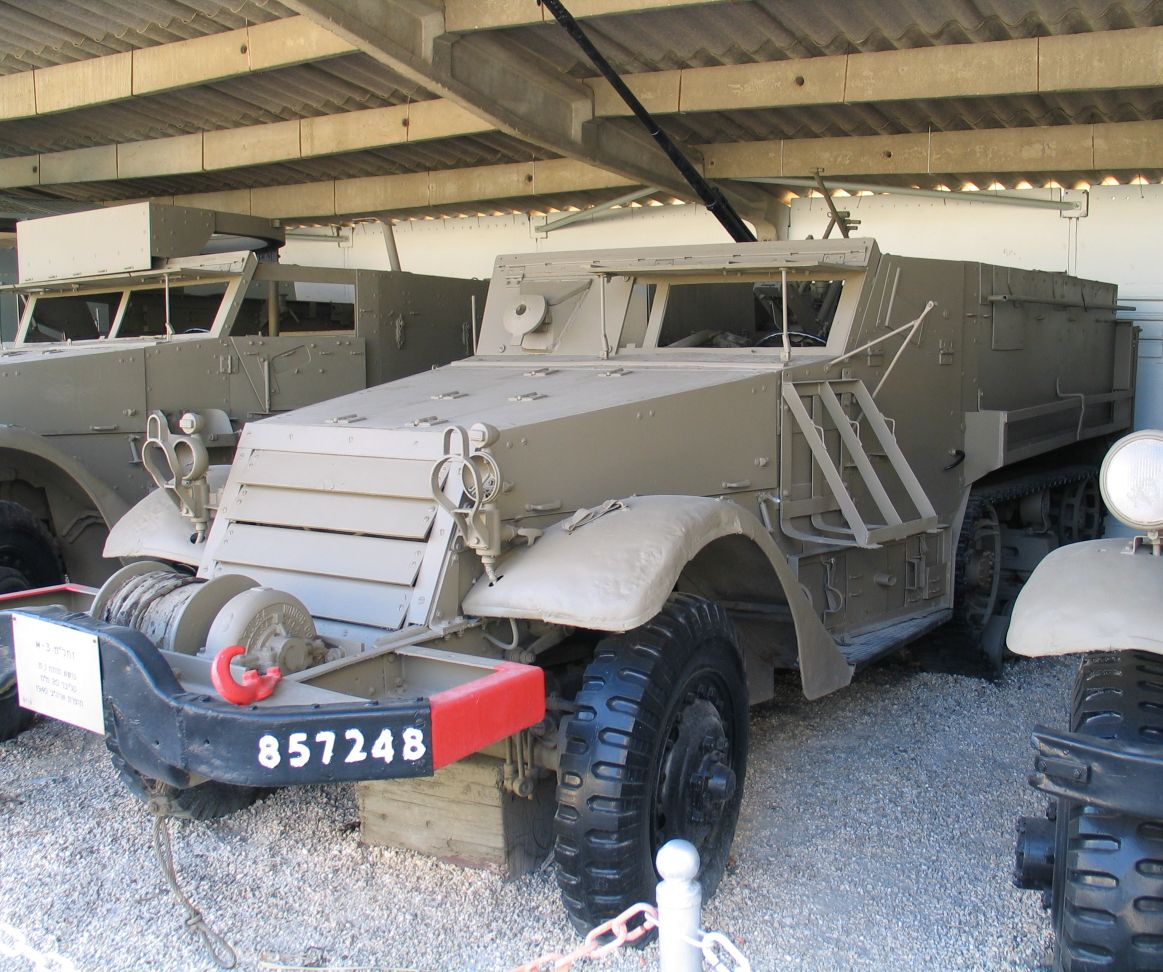
An Israeli modified M3 half-track, armed with a 20 mm cannon

- M3 Mk. A (M3 Degem Alef) – M5 APC. Israeli half-tracks were all designated M3, even M2/M9 variants and known as the Zakhlam or "half-catepillar" (זחל״ם) in Hebrew for its hybrid propulsion. The Mk. A APCs were generally identified as IHC M5s because of their RED-450 engines. While the M49 mount was retained, various machine guns were used.
- M3 Mk. B (M3 Degem Bet) – M5 converted as a command carrier with extra radios and a front winch bumper. Mk. Bs featured M2HB machine guns.
- M3 Mk. C (M3 Degem Gimel) – Similar to M21 MMC, an M3 type (assumed from the common use of the White 160AX engine) Half-track with an M1 81 mm Mortar. Development began in 1950. A prototype underwent trials in December 1951. First vehicles were issued to units in September 1953.
- M3 Mk. D (M3 Degem Dalet) – Another M3 based mortar carrier, fitted with the 120 mm Soltam mortar. Development began in 1952. Entered service in 1960.
- M3 Mk. E (M3 Degem He) - M3 fitted with Krupp 75 mm gun. A single prototype was built in May 1951 and underwent trials in July 1951 and August 1953. By 1955, the IDF Artillery Corps lost interest in the project.
- M3 Mk. F (M3 Degem Waw) - A proposed configuration of M3 with two 20 mm anti-aircraft cannons. The project was abandoned in 1952 after a preliminary check.
- M3 TCM-20 – M3/M5 half-tracks fitted with the Israeli TCM-20 armament turret with two 20 mm Hispano-Suiza HS.404 cannon fitted to old Maxson turrets. The right-hand vision port was often replaced with a ball mount for a machine gun. They proved to be very effective in fighting anti-tank missile teams; their cannons forced the teams to take cover or suppressed them so they could not use their missiles accurately.

== Operators ==
- Argentina (ex-British surplus M3s)
- Austria – Bundesheer
- Belgium – Belgian Army
- Brazil – Brazilian Expeditionary Force
- Cambodia – Royal Cambodian Army
- Cameroon
- Canada – Canadian Army
- Chile
- China – National Revolutionary Army
- Czechoslovakia
- Denmark – Danish Army
- Dominican Republic – Dominican Army: 16 still in service in 1994.
- El Salvador – Salvadoran Army: 5 in service in 1988.
- France – French Army
- Germany – The German Wehrmacht used captured vehicles in North Africa and on the Western front during World War II.
- West Germany – West German Bundeswehr
- Greece – Greek Army
- Israel – Israel Defense Forces (IDF)
- Italy – Italian Army
- India – Indian Army
- Japan – GSDF
- South Korea
- Kingdom of Laos – Royal Lao Army
- Liberia
- Madagascar
- Mali – Malian Army
- Mexico
- Morocco
- Netherlands
- New Zealand
- Nicaragua
- Norway
- Pakistan – Pakistani Army
- Paraguay – Paraguayan Army
- Peru – Peruvian Army
- Philippines – Philippine Army and Philippine Constabulary
- Portugal – Portuguese Army
- Poland
- Senegal
- Soviet Union – Soviet Army
- Togo
- Turkey – Turkish Army
- United Kingdom – British Army
- United States – United States Army
- South Vietnam – Army of the Republic of Vietnam
- Vietnam – People's Army of Vietnam
- Yugoslavia – Yugoslav People's Army
- Zaire – Forces Armées Zaïroises, used into the 1980s

=== Non-state former operators ===
- Kataeb Regulatory Forces (KRF) – supplied by Israel.
- Tigers Militia – supplied by Israel.
- Lebanese Forces – Inherited from the KRF and the Tigers Militia.
- People's Liberation Army (Lebanon) (PLA) – captured from the Lebanese Forces.
- South Lebanon Army (SLA) – supplied by Israel.
- Amal Movement – captured from the SLA.
- Hezbollah – captured from the SLA.

== See also ==
- List of U.S. military vehicles by supply catalog designation
- List of U.S. military vehicles by model number
- Sd.Kfz. 251
