= T19 Howitzer Motor Carriage =

T19 howitzer motor carriage
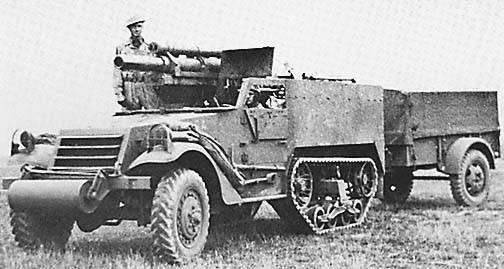
- A T19 howitzer motor carriage
- Type: Self-propelled gun
- Place of origin: United States

Service history
- In service: 1942–45
- Used by: United States
- Wars: World War II

Production history
- Designer: Ordnance Department
- Designed: 1941
- Manufacturer: Diamond T
- Produced: January – April 1942
- No. built: 324

Specifications
- Mass: 9.54 short tons (8.65 t)
- Length: 20 ft 2 in (6.15 m)
- Width: 7 ft 3.5 in (2.223 m)
- Height: 7 ft 8 in (2.34 m)
- Crew: 6
- Armor: Howitzer shield: 0.25 in (6.4 mm); Windshield: 0.50 in (13 mm); Sides and rear: 0.25 in (6.4 mm)
- Main armament: M2A1 105 mm Howitzer (8 rounds)
- Secondary armament: .50 cal (12.7 mm) M2 Browning machine gun
- Engine: White 160AX, 386 in^{3} (6,330 cc), 6-cylinder, gasoline, compression ratio 6.3:1; 147 hp (110 kW)
- Power/weight: 14.7 hp/ton
- Suspension: Front: semi-elliptical longitudinal leaf spring rear: single vertical volute spring bogie
- Fuel capacity: 60 US gal (230 L)
- Operational range: 200 mi (320 km)
- Maximum speed: 45 mph (72 km/h)

The T19 howitzer motor carriage (HMC) was a 105 mm (4.1 in) howitzer mounted on a M3 Half-track chassis. It saw service during World War II with the U.S. Army. Its secondary armament consisted of an air-cooled .50 in (13 mm) M2 machine gun for local defense. It was produced by Diamond T between January 1942 and April 1942.

It principally served in the North African Campaign, although some served in the Allied invasion of Sicily and the subsequent Italian Campaign, and even as late as the invasion of southern France in 1944.

== Specifications ==
The T19 howitzer gun motor carriage is an artillery purpose M3 Half-track, with a howitzer emplaced on the tracked portion of the frame. It was 20 ft 2 in long, 7 ft 3.5 in wide, 7 ft 8 in high, with a weight of 9.54 short tons. The suspension consisted of semi-elliptical longitudinal leaf springs for the wheels and vertical volute springs for the tracks. It was powered by a White 160AX, 147 hp, 386 in^{3}, six-cylinder gasoline engine with a compression ratio of 6.3:1. It was capable of a maximum road speed of 45 mph. The power-to-weight ratio was 14.7 hp/ton.

The vehicle was operated by a crew of six. Maximum armor was only 0.5 inch at the windshield and 0.25 inches everywhere else. The armament consisted of one 105 mm M2A1 howitzer (equipped with eight rounds of ammunition) with a single .50 caliber (12.7 mm) M2 Browning machine gun (equipped with 300 rounds of ammunition) for local defense.

== Development ==
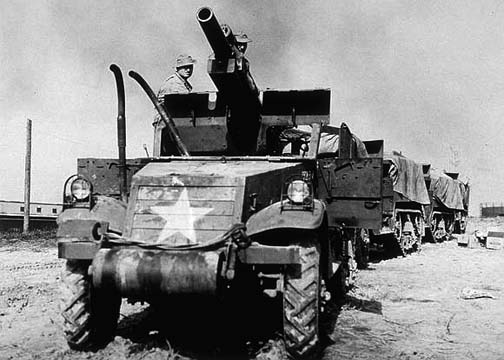
A T19 near Newport News, Virginia

In the autumn of 1941, when the Armored Force expanded, an urgent need for self-propelled artillery arose. Although a full-track chassis was preferred, the situation required the use of whatever vehicles were immediately available. The M3 Half-track was selected to carry a 105 mm M2A1 howitzer. Although this design had originally been suggested in September 1941, it had not been taken up. However, the urgency of the requirement resulted in the approval by the Adjutant General and the construction of a prototype was authorized by OCM 17391, dated 31 October 1941; the new vehicle designated as the 105 mm howitzer motor carriage T19.

As with other American self-propelled guns produced during the early World War II period, the prototype was assembled and tested at the Aberdeen Proving Ground. The M2 recoil mechanism and other parts of the M2 howitzer carriage were used in the vehicle mounting. After several tests, the gun carriage proved fragile on bumpy terrain. The problem was corrected by reinforcing the frame, and redesigning the howitzer mount. Demountable headlights were recommended because of the muzzle blast, although they were not available for early production models. Early models had no shield for the howitzer either, but a foldable shield was added during testing. The gun faced forward, like many other half-track models. The total traverse was 40 degrees and the elevation was from −5 to +35 degrees. The armored windshield cover was remounted so it could fold onto the hood. After further testing, it was accepted for production.

After the design was accepted, a prototype was shipped to Diamond T as a guide for production. The first production vehicle was delivered to the US Army in January 1942. A total of 324 T19s had been made by the time production ended in April 1942.

Production of T19
Month	T19
January 1942	1
February 1942	38
March 1942	136
April 1942	149
Total	324

== Service history ==
The T19 first served in the Tunisia Campaign in North Africa in 1942–43. It was employed mainly in most battalions' headquarters platoons, and the "cannon companies" of infantry divisions. (Note: A "cannon company" was a unit included in most infantry divisions, which normally consisted of six T30 HMCs and two T19s.) The T19 was soon replaced in armored divisions by the M7 Priest, a 105 mm howitzer on a fully tracked chassis.

It served with only a few units in Sicily and Italy. On one occasion, the cannon company of the 16th Infantry Regiment halted a German tank attack by destroying six tanks, for the loss of one T19. That unit was later awarded the Presidential Unit Citation. A few served as late as 1945 in southern France. It was finally declared obsolete in July 1945. That month, the contractor Brown & McLaughlin converted 90 T19s back into standard M3A1 Half-tracks.

== See also ==
- List of U.S. military vehicles by supply catalog designation
