= M3 howitzer =

105 mm Howitzer M3
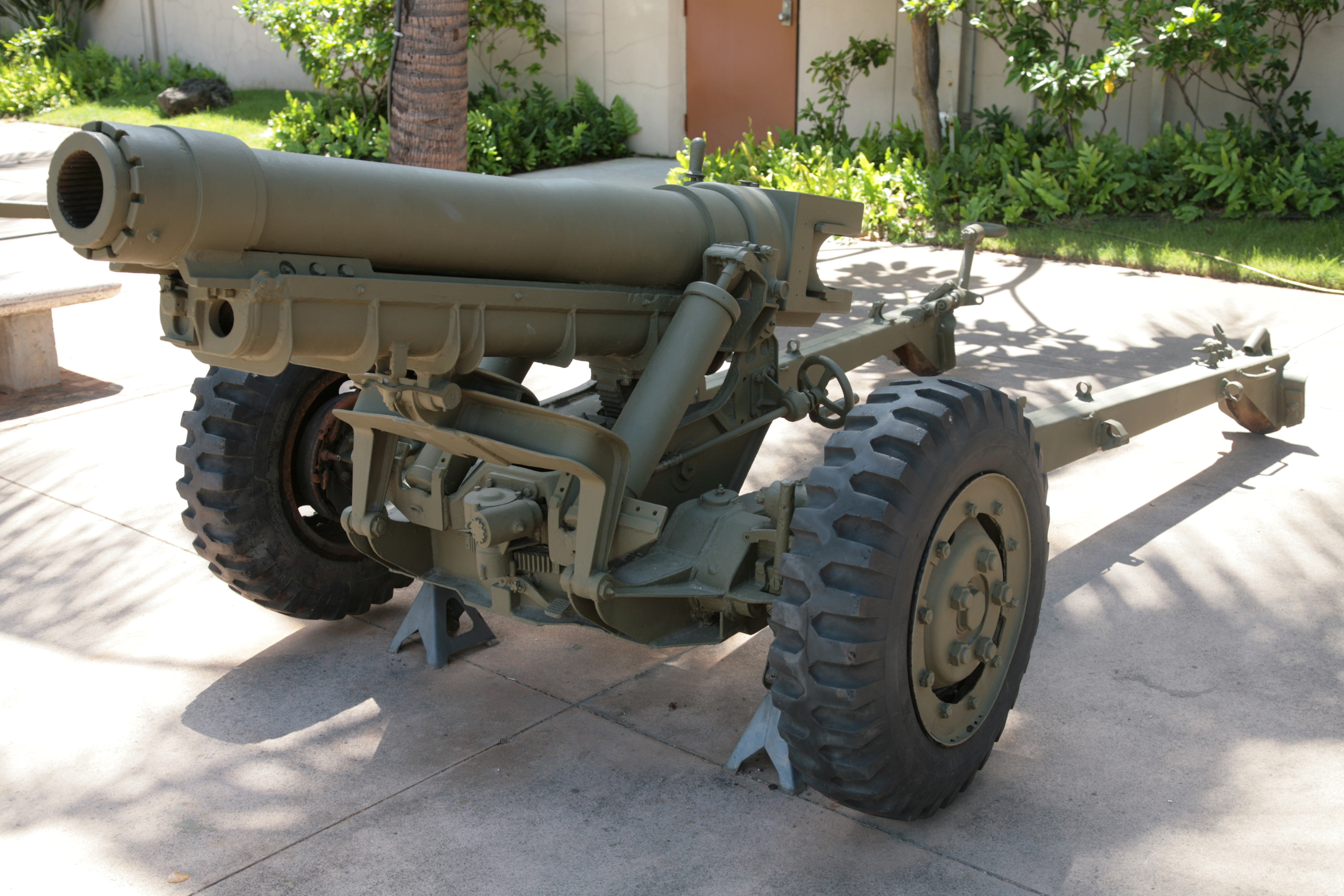
- A M3 howitzer outside the Army Museum in Honolulu, Hawaii.
- Type: Light Howitzer
- Place of origin: United States

Service history
- In service: 1943–present
- Used by: United States
- Wars: World War II; First Indochina War; Korean War

Production history
- Designed: 1941
- Produced: 1943–1945
- No. built: 2,580

Specifications
- Mass: 2,495 lb (1,130 kg)
- Length: 12 ft 11 in (3.94 m)
- Barrel length: Overall: 6 ft 2 in (1.88 m) L/17.9; Bore: 5 ft 6 in (1.68 m) L/16
- Width: 5 ft 7 in (1.70 m)
- Height: 4 ft 2 in (1.27 m)
- Crew: 10
- Shell: 105 × 372 mm R
- Shell weight: 36 lb 10 oz – 43 lb 3 oz (16.6–19.6 kg)
- Caliber: 4.1 in (105 mm)
- Breech: Horizontal-block
- Recoil: Hydro-pneumatic, constant
- Carriage: Split trail
- Elevation: −9° to 30°
- Traverse: 45°
- Rate of fire: Burst: 4 rpm Sustained: 2 rpm
- Muzzle velocity: 1,020 ft/s (311 m/s)
- Maximum firing range: HE: 8,300 yd (7,600 m)

The 105 mm Howitzer M3 was a U.S. light howitzer designed for use by airborne troops. The gun utilized the barrel of the 105 mm Howitzer M2, shortened and fitted to a slightly modified split trail carriage of the 75 mm pack howitzer.

The howitzer was used by the U.S. Army during World War II. It was issued to airborne units and the cannon companies of infantry regiments.

== Development and production ==
The process of building airborne forces in 1941 led to a requirement for an air-portable 105 mm howitzer. The weapon, initially designated T7, featured a barrel from the 105mm Howitzer M2, shortened by 27 inches (690 mm) and combined with the recoil system and carriage from the 75 mm pack howitzer. A prototype reached trials at Aberdeen Proving Ground in March 1942.

The howitzer was designed to fire the same ammunition as the M2 howitzer, however, it was found that the shorter barrel resulted in incomplete burning of the propelling charge. The problem could be solved by use of faster-burning powder, and otherwise, the design was considered acceptable and was standardized as the 105 mm Howitzer M3 on Carriage M3. The carriage was soon succeeded by the M3A1, which had trails made from thicker steel plate. Even stronger tubular trails were designed, but never reached production.

Production started in February 1943 and continued until May 1944; an additional batch was produced from April to June 1945.

Production of М3, pcs.
Year	1943	1944	1945	Total
Produced, pcs.	1,965	410	205	2,580

== Service ==
Even though the M3 was not mentioned in the February 1944 T/O&E, shortly before the Normandy airdrops some airborne divisions received a 105 mm glider field artillery battalion equipped with them as a supplement to their existing three 75 mm howitzer battalions (designated the M1A1 during World War II). 1/4 ton jeeps were used as prime movers. Later increased to four battalions, one, between 1943 and 1945, was converted to 105mm M3. The weapon was finally authorized as an option by the December 1944 TO&E, and by 1945 was employed by all airborne divisions in the European Theater.

The initial production of the M3 was adequate to equip the cannon companies of the three hundred infantry regiments that had been forecast in the initial war plans. The M3 was the primary weapon of these companies, and appeared in the table of organization and equipment (T/O&E) from early 1944 (six, in three platoons of two) Often the cannon companies were integrated into the division artillery. The infantry used 1½ ton cargo trucks as the prime mover. In an assessment written after the war "The cannon company of 1943-45 failed to live up to the expectations of the force designers of 1942. The main problem was the substitution of towed low-velocity howitzers for the self-propelled versions as originally intended. This howitzer, the M3, had a shorter barrel than the regular 105-mm howitzer M2, possessed no ballistic shield, and had an effective range of only 7,250 yards (6.63 km) as compared to 12,500 yards (11.4 km) for the M2."

A small number of M3s were supplied via lend lease channels to France (94), United Kingdom (2) and countries of Latin America (18). They were used early in the Korean War as ROK divisional artillery.

== Operators ==
- Argentina
- Brazil
- Dominican Republic
- France
- Mexico
- Philippines
- Republic of Korea: The Armed Forces received 91 M3s from the U.S. in 1948. Replacement with M2A1s began in July 1950.
- South Vietnam: 11 in 1953
- United Kingdom
- United States

== Variants ==
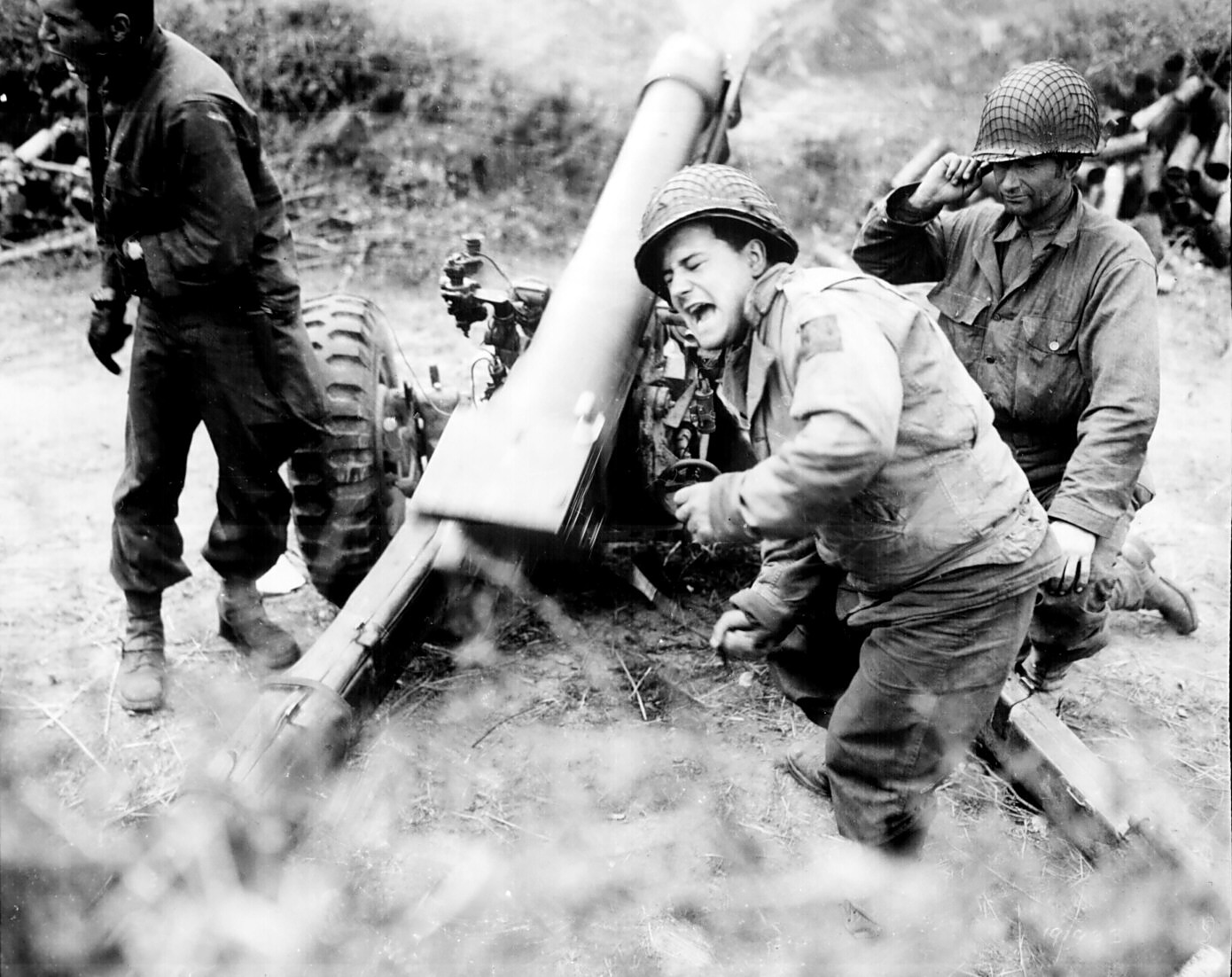
M3 near Carentan, France, 11 July 1944.

Gun variants:

- T7, standardized as M3.
- T10 - variant with elevation increased to 65 degrees.

Carriage variants:

- M3 - based on M3A1 carriage for the 75 mm field howitzer.
- M3A1 - had stronger trails, made from 1/8 inch (3.2 mm) plate instead of 3/32 inch (2.4 mm).
- M3A2 - was fitted with shield.

== Self-propelled mounts ==
There were two proposals for a self-propelled artillery piece armed with the M3. Neither reached mass production.

External image
- 105 mm HMC T82.

- 105 mm Howitzer Motor Carriage T38 - based on the M3 halftrack, never built.
- 105 mm Howitzer Motor Carriage T82 (M3 in mount M3A1) - based on the Light Tank M5A1 chassis. Two pilots were built. The project was cancelled in June 1945 due to lack of requirement.

== Ammunition ==
The gun fired semi-fixed ammunition, similar to the ammunition of the M2; it used the same projectiles and the same 105 mm Cartridge Case M14, but with different propelling charge. The latter used faster burning powder to avoid incomplete burning; it consisted of a base charge and four increments, forming five charges from 1 (the smallest) to 5 (the largest). In an emergency, gunners were authorized to fire M1 HE rounds prepared for the Howitzer M2, but only with charges from 1 to 3. M1 HE rounds for the M3 could be fired from an M2 with any charge.

HEAT M67 Shell had non-adjustable propelling charge. For blank ammunition, a shorter Cartridge Case M15 with black powder charge was used.

Available ammunition
Type	Model	Weight (round/projectile)	Filler	Muzzle velocity	Range
HE	HE M1 Shell	18.35 kg (40 lb) / 14.97 kg (33 lb)	50/50 TNT or amatol, 2.18 kg (4 lb 13 oz)	311 m/s (1,020 ft/s)	7,585 m (8,300 yd)
HEAT-T	HEAT M67 Shell	16.62 kg (37 lb) / 13.25 kg (29 lb)		311 m/s (1,020 ft/s)	7,760 m (8,500 yd)
Smoke	WP M60 Shell	18.97 kg (42 lb) / 15.56 kg (34 lb)	White Phosphorus, 1.84 kg (4.1 lb)	311 m/s (1,020 ft/s)	7,585 m (8,300 yd)
Smoke	FS M60 Shell	19.65 kg (43 lb) /	Sulfur trioxide in Chlorosulfonic acid, 2.09 kg (4 lb 10 oz)
Smoke	HC BE M84 Shell	18.29 kg (40 lb) / 14.91 kg (33 lb)	Zinc chloride	311 m/s (1,020 ft/s)	7,585 m (8,300 yd)
Drill	Drill Cartridge M14			-	-
Blank				-	-

Armor penetration, mm
Ammunition \ Distance, m	0	457 mm (18.0 in)	914 mm (36.0 in)	1,828 mm (72.0 in)
HEAT M67 Shell (meet angle 0°)	102 mm (4.0 in)
Concrete penetration, mm
HE M1 Shell (meet angle 0°)	305 mm (12.0 in)	274 mm (10.8 in)	244 mm (9.6 in)	213 mm (8.4 in)
Different methods of measurement were used in different countries / periods. Therefore, direct comparison is often impossible.

== See also ==
- OTO Melara Mod 56 - Similar mountain gun developed for the Italian Army
