= M116 howitzer =

American pack howitzer

75mm pack howitzer M1A1
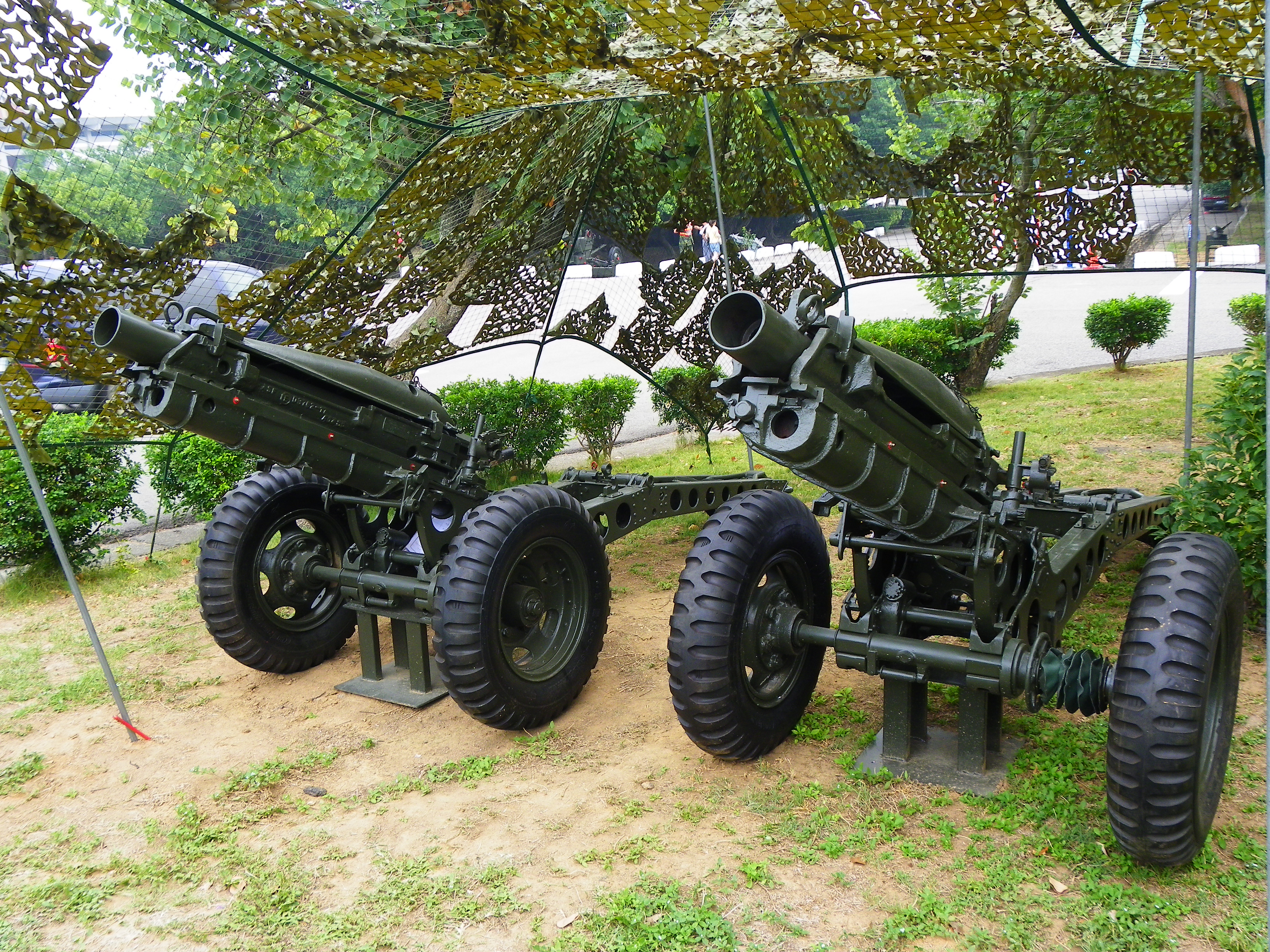
- M116 howitzers, Chengkungling History Museum, Taiwan (2011)
- Type: Pack howitzer
- Place of origin: United States

Service history
- In service: 1927–present
- Used by: See Users
- Wars: World War II; Second Sino-Japanese War; Korean War; Chinese Civil War; First Indochina War; Vietnam War; Laotian Civil War; Cambodian Civil War; Kurdish–Turkish conflict

Production history
- Manufacturer: General Electric
- Produced: 1927–1944
- No. built: 8,400

Specifications (on Carriage (airborne) M8)
- Mass: 653 kg (1,439 lbs)
- Length: 3.68 m (12 ft 1 in)
- Barrel length: Overall 1.38 m (4 ft 6 in) L/18.4; Bore: 1.19 m (3 ft 11 in) L/15.9
- Width: 1.22 m (4 ft)
- Height: 94 cm (3 ft 1 in)
- Crew: 8 (in U.S. service)
- Shell: Fixed and Semi-fixed; 75 x 272 mm R
- Shell weight: 8.27 kg (18 lb 4 oz)
- Caliber: 75 mm (2.95 in)
- Breech: Horizontal-block
- Recoil: Hydro-pneumatic, constant
- Carriage: Box trail or Split-trail depending on model
- Elevation: -5° to +45°
- Traverse: 6°
- Rate of fire: 6 rpm
- Muzzle velocity: 381 m/s (1,250 ft/s)
- Effective firing range: 8.8 km (5.5 mi)

The 75mm pack howitzer M1 (redesignated the M116 in 1962) was a pack howitzer designed in the United States. The gun saw combat in World War II with the United States Army (primarily in airborne units) and the United States Marine Corps, and was also supplied to foreign militaries. Initially designed to be moved across difficult terrain, the gun and carriage could be broken down into several pieces to be carried by pack animals, and this ability as well as its compact size allowed it to be used by paratroop and glider forces.

In addition to the pack or air-portable configuration, the gun was also mounted on a split-trail carriage to serve as a field artillery piece. The M1 in its original version was mated to a number of self-propelled carriages, though only one of those – 75 mm HMC T30 – reached mass production, while the M2 and M3 variants were vehicle-mounted in the 75 mm HMC M8 and some LVT models.

== Development and production ==
The 75 mm pack howitzer was designed in the United States in the 1920s to meet a need for an artillery piece that could be moved across difficult terrain. Development began in 1920, and in August 1927, the weapon was standardized as howitzer, pack, 75mm M1 on carriage M1. Due to meager funding, production rates were very low; by 1933, only 32 guns had been manufactured, and by 1940, only 91 pieces. It was not until September 1940 that the howitzer was put into mass production. By then, the M1 had been succeeded by the slightly modified M1A1. Production continued until December 1944.

The only significant changes during the mass production period were carriage improvements. The original carriage M1 was of the box trail type, with wooden wheels. The requirement for a lightweight howitzer for airborne troops led to the introduction of the M8 carriage, similar except for new wheels with pneumatic tires.

Another requirement, from the United States Cavalry, resulted in a completely different family of "field howitzers" mounted on split trail rather than box trail carriages (M3A1, M3A2, and M3A3). However, only limited numbers of the M1 field howitzer variant were built because of the Cavalry branch's rapid switch to self-propelled guns.

Wartime production of М1, pcs.
Year	1940	1941	1942	1943	1944	Total
Pack howitzers, pcs.	36	188	1,280	2,592	915	4,939
Field howitzers, pcs.	–	234	64	51	–	349

== Description ==
The howitzer M1 or M1A1 consisted of the gun tube and breech, joined together by interrupted threads, allowing for quick assembly and disassembly. One-eighth of a turn was required to connect or disconnect the two elements. The tube had uniform, right-hand rifling with one turn in 20 calibers. The breech was of horizontal sliding-block type, with a continuous-pull firing mechanism. The recoil system was hydro-pneumatic, with the buffer and recuperator under the barrel.

"Weapons Of The Field Artillery" (1953) - Official United States Army artillery training information reel.

The pack howitzer carriage M1 was of box trail type, and originally had steel-rimmed wooden wheels. For transportation, the howitzer M1 or M1A1 on carriage M1 could be broken down into six loads for pack animals, with weights between 73 kg (161 lb) and 107 kg (236 lb) each:

- Tube
- Breech and wheels
- Top sleigh and cradle
- Bottom sleigh and recoil mechanism
- Front trail
- Rear trail and axle.

The carriage M8 was identical except for the axle arms and wheels, which were metal with pneumatic tires. The howitzer on carriage M8 could be broken down into seven mule loads or into nine parachute loads (the latter arrangement included 18 rounds of ammunition). It could also be towed by a vehicle such as a 1/4 ton jeep, or transported by plane or glider such as the CG-4 Waco.

In contrast, the field howitzer carriages were non-dismantling, and were fitted with metal wheels with pneumatic tires. They also had an additional retractable support, referred to as a firing base; in the firing position, the base could be lowered and the wheels raised, leaving the weapon to rest on the firing base and trails.

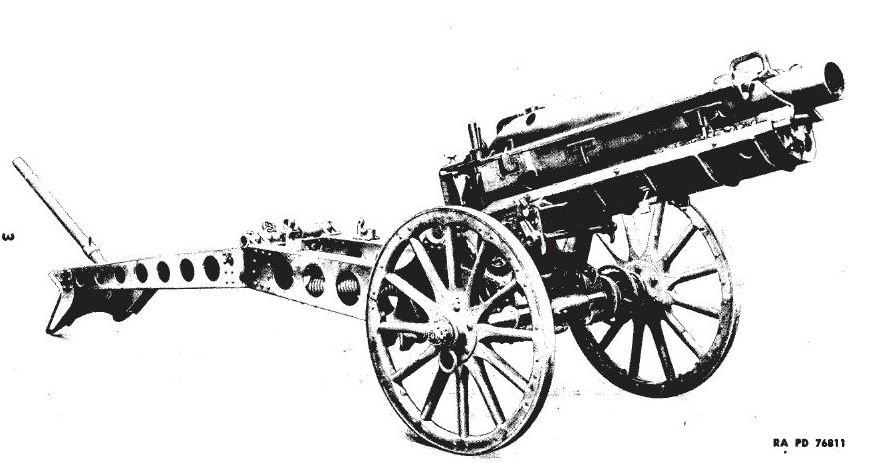
75 mm howitzer on carriage M1

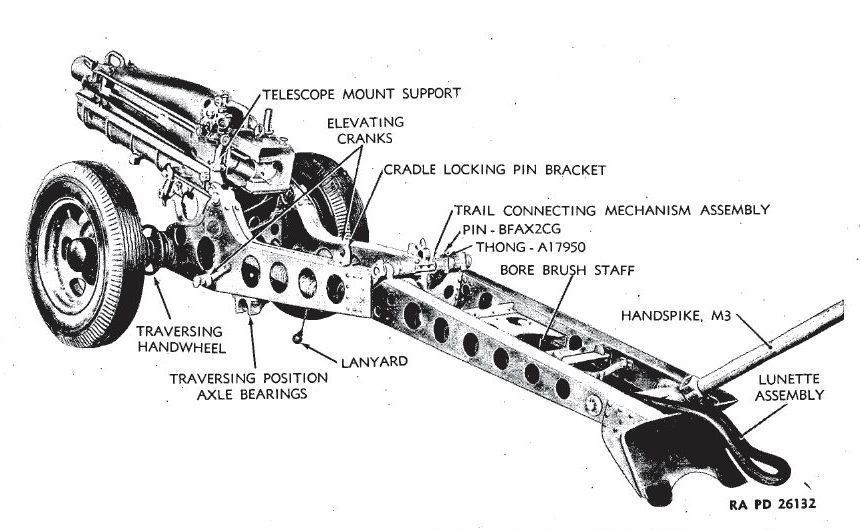
75 mm howitzer on carriage M8

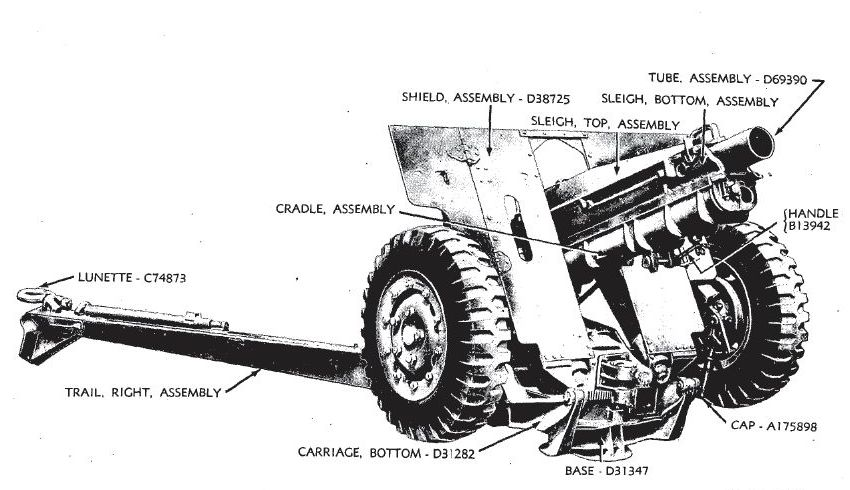
75 mm howitzer on carriage M3A3

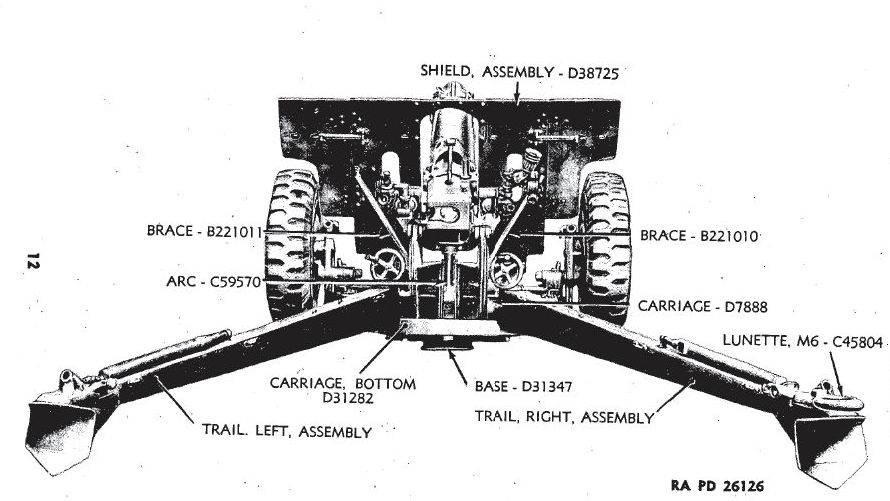
75 mm howitzer on carriage M3A3

== Organization and service ==
=== US military ===
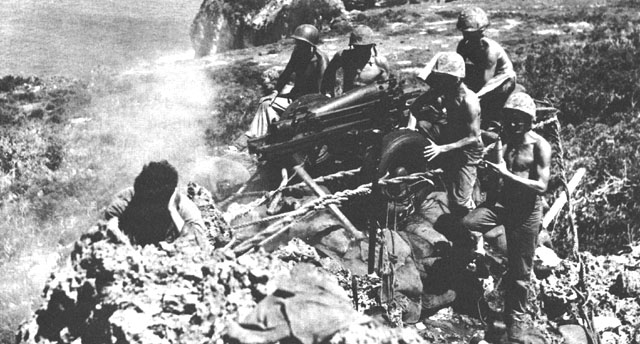
75 mm pack howitzer on carriage M8 during the Battle of Tinian.

In the Second World War era US Army, 75 mm howitzers were issued to airborne and mountain units.

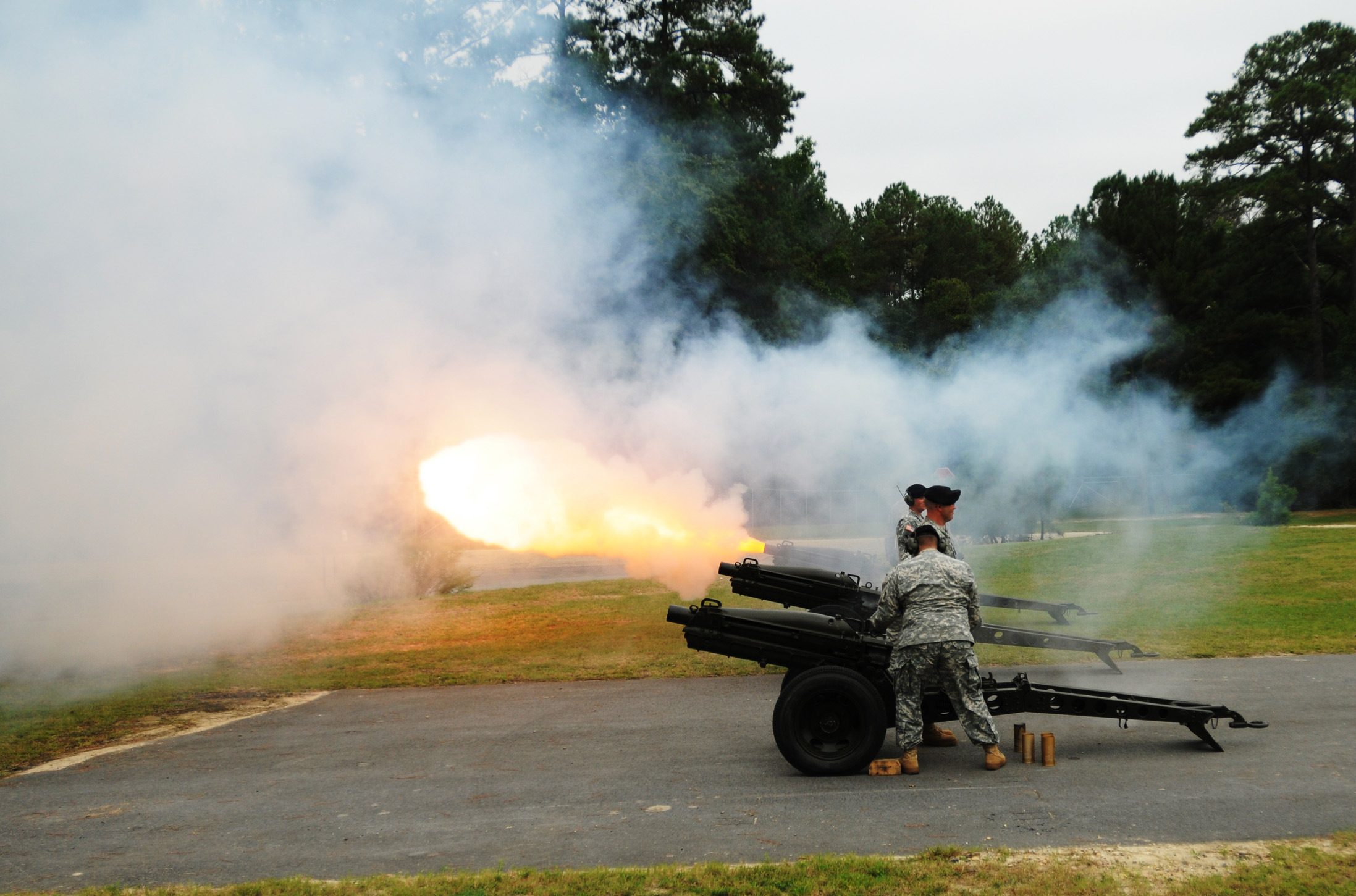
Salute battery fires its guns during a ceremony at Fort Jackson, in 2009.

An airborne division, according to the table of organization and equipment (T/O&E) of February 1944, had three 75 mm howitzer battalions – two glider field artillery battalions (two six-gun batteries each) and one parachute field artillery battalion (three four-gun batteries), in total 36 pieces per division. In December 1944, new Tables of Organization and Equipment increased the divisional firepower to 60 75 mm howitzers, while as an option, the 75 mm pieces in the glider battalions could be replaced with the more powerful 105 mm M3 howitzer).

The only mountain division formed, the 10th, had three 75 mm howitzer battalions, with 12 pieces each. The gun was also used by some separate field artillery battalions. These included mule-packed field artillery battalions seeing service in Burma.

The M1A1 also saw use during the Battle of Anzio, 39th Field Artillery Regiment.

In the US Marine Corps, under the "E-Series" T/O&E from 15 April 1943, the divisional artillery included three 75 mm howitzer battalions with 12 pieces each. The F-series T/O&E from 5 May 1944 reduced the number of 75 mm battalions to two, while the G-series T/O&E removed them altogether and marked a completion of the shift to 105 mm and 155 mm howitzers. Although the G-series T/O&E was only adopted officially on 4 September 1945, in practice many changes contained in the table were introduced early in 1945.

The M116 is still used by the US military for ceremonial purposes as a salute gun firing blanks.

=== Other operators ===
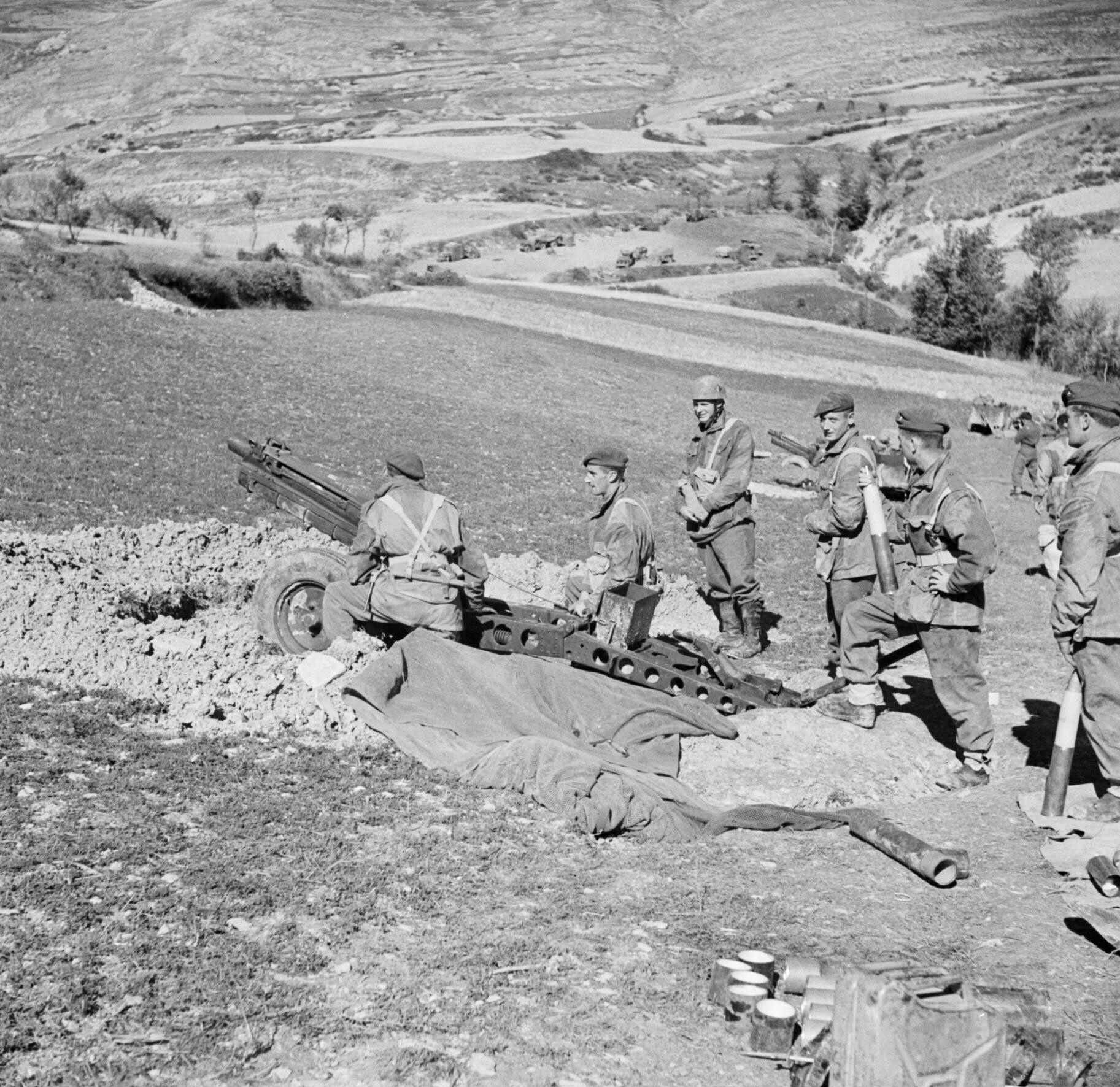
75 mm howitzer of the 1st Airlanding Light Artillery Regiment in action in Italy.

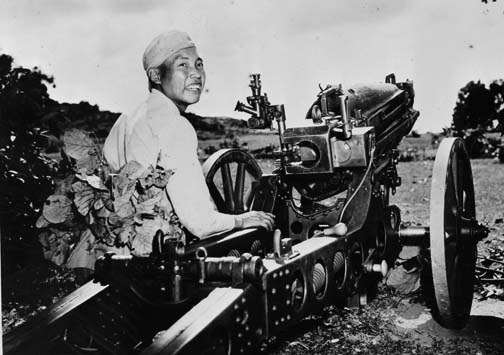
75 mm pack howitzer on carriage M1, supplied to Chinese forces.

Two major lend lease recipients of the M1 were United Kingdom (826 pack howitzers) and China (637 pack howitzers and 125 field howitzers). 68 pieces were supplied to France, and 60 to various countries in Latin America.

In British service, the howitzer was issued to two mountain artillery regiments, two air-landing light artillery regiments, raiding support regiment and was temporarily used by some other units. The gun remained in British service until the late 1950s.

The 75 mm howitzer was also used by Australian forces – two mountain batteries and some other units.

A single howitzer was airdropped in April 1945 to the 2nd (Italian) SAS Regiment, a special force coordinated by Major Roy Farran and composed of partisans with mixed political allegiances, Russian ex-prisoners-of-war, and Wehrmacht deserters. Baptized "Molto Stanco" ("Very tired" in Italian), the gun was used in the course of Operation Tombola to harass enemy convoys driving up and down along Route 12 between Modena and Florence. On 21 April 1945, the howitzer was towed by means of a Willys Jeep to the outskirts of Reggio Emilia, from where the Italian gunners initiated a shelling of the city that wrought panic among Axis troops. Believing that the arrival of Allied forces was imminent, the Germans and their fascist allies evacuated the city.

In China after the loss of the mainland, guns left behind were seized by the People's Liberation Army and used during the Korean War. There is record of these guns being used at the Siege of Dien Bien Phu and, presumably, in later conflicts. The type also remained in use with the Republic of China Army's outlying island garrisons (as coastal artillery) as well as mountain troops.

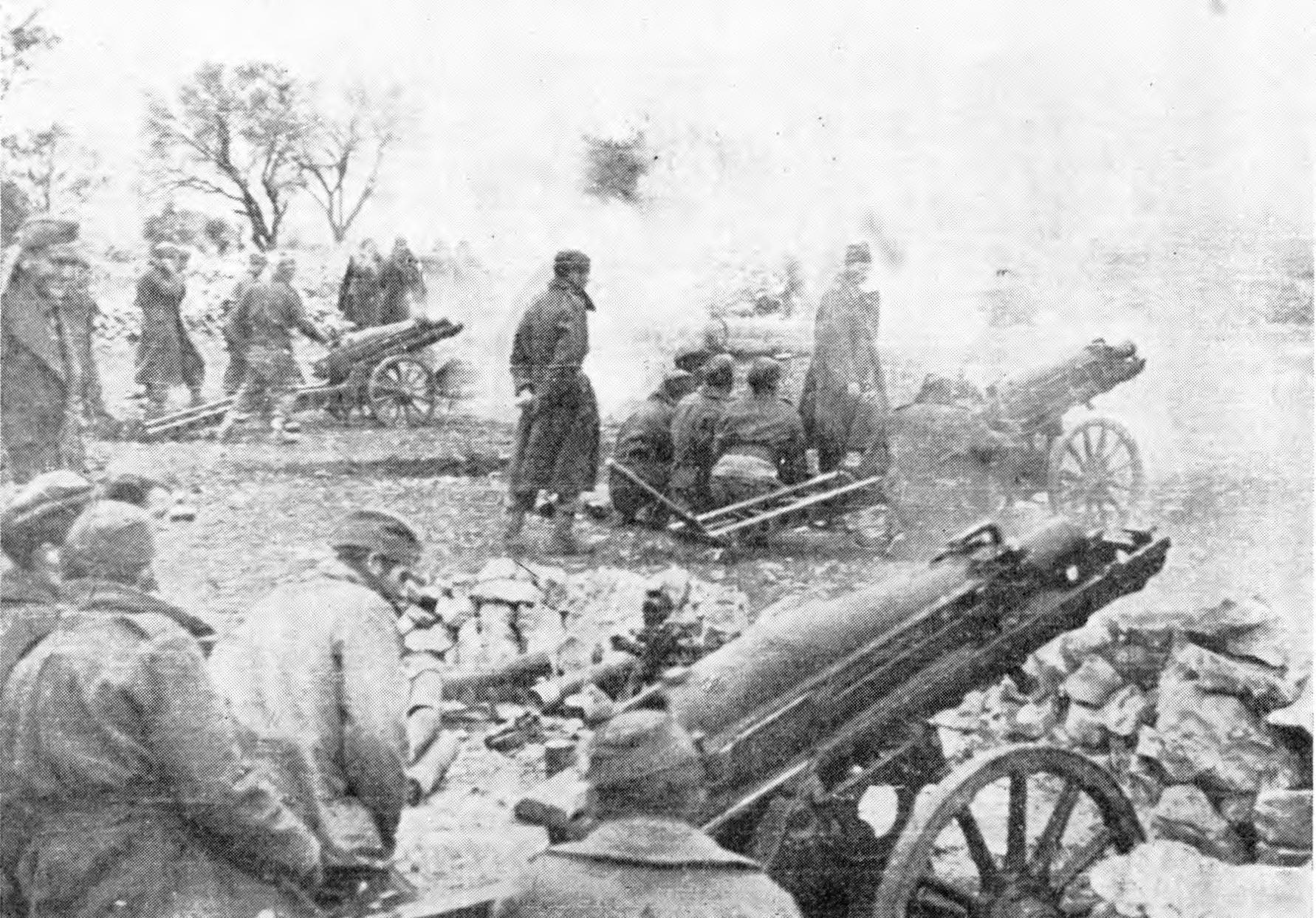
M1s of the Artillery brigade of the 8th Dalmatian Corps during Battle of Knin, 1944

153 M116s were supplied to Japan (Japan Ground Self-Defense Force) and they were used until the 1980s. The Croatian Army fields M116 howitzers as ceremonial cannon, 12 of which are still kept in service for that purpose; an additional 45 guns have been retired and are no longer utilized by the army, some being stored in local army museums.

In 2010, the M116 75 mm pack howitzer was used by the Turkish Army in operations against Kurdish separatists in southeastern Turkey.

The howitzers have been used for avalanche control at several western US ski areas.

Three howitzers are used by Norwich University's Norwich Artillery Battery, along with a Civil War-era cannon used for ceremonies. The howitzers are used in field training exercises for both the Battery and the school's Ranger Company and the Corps of Cadets, as well as school traditions, such as at football game kickoffs. The University of North Georgia, one of six senior military colleges also utilizes a pack howitzer at the base of their drill field. The piece is fired daily during reveille, retreat and during any special ceremonies honoring military graduates or active duty personnel.

== Variants ==
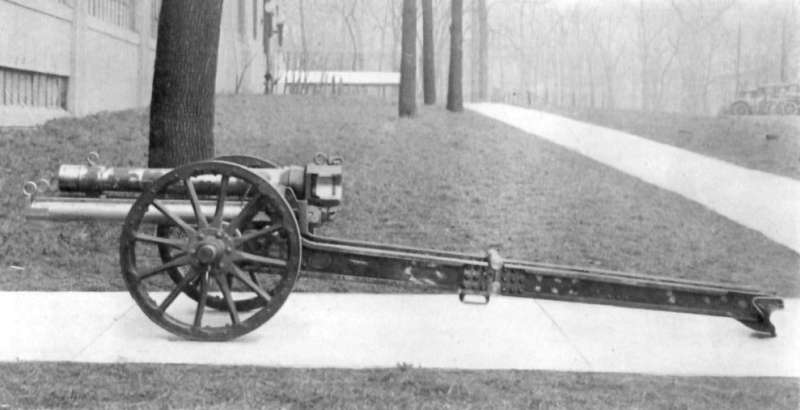
75 mm howitzer M1920

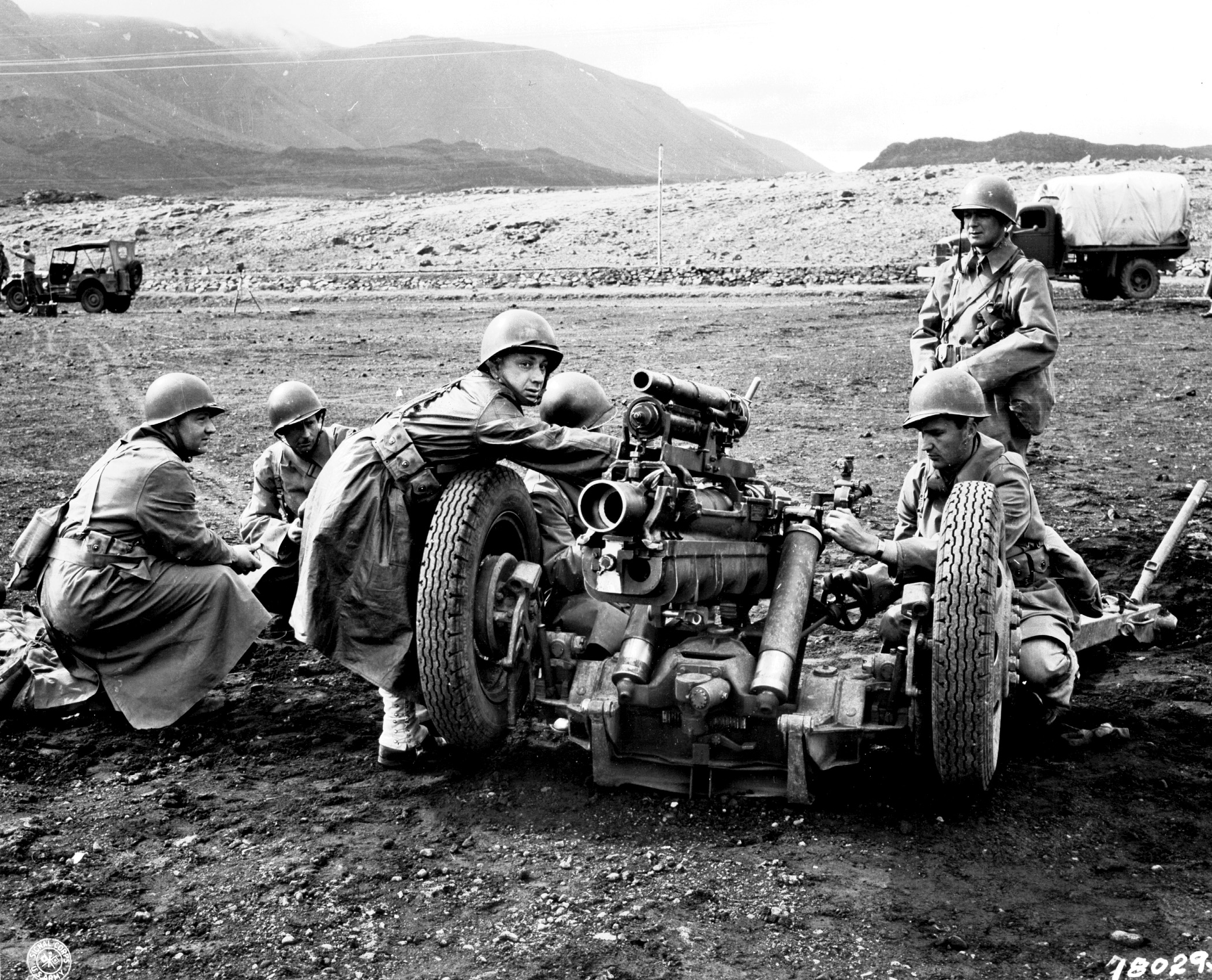
75 mm howitzer on carriage M3A1, fitted with 37 mm subcaliber gun for training

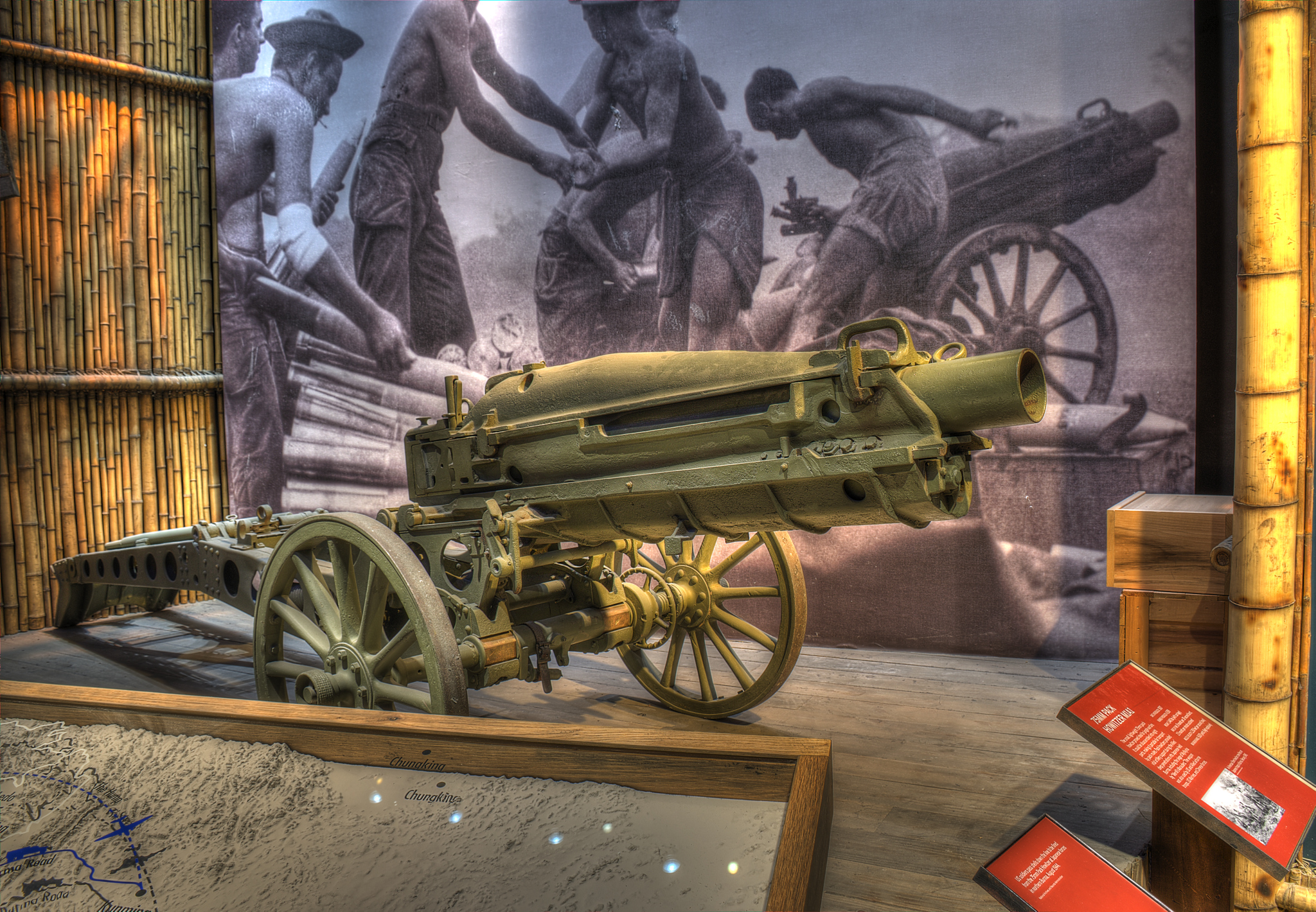
75 mm pack howitzer on display at the National World War II Museum

- Howitzer variants:
  - M1920, M1922A, M1922B, M1923B, M1923E1, M1923E2 – prototypes.
  - M1 – the first standardized variant. Based on M1923E2 with minor changes
  - M1A1 – variant with modified breech block and breech ring
  - M2 – vehicle mounted variant. Tube and breech from M1A1 were used. In order to provide a cylindrical recoil surface, the tube was fitted with an external sleeve. 197 built.
  - M3 – vehicle mounted variant. Similar to M2 but with recoil surface as a part of the tube. The M2 and M3 barrels were interchangeable.
  - M116 – post-war designation of the complete weapon
  - M120 – post-war designation for saluting howitzers, can only fire blanks
- Carriage variants:
  - M1 – dismantling box trail carriage with wooden wheels
  - M2A1, T2, T2E1, T2E2, T2E3 – experimental carriages
  - M3A1 – split-trail carriage with firing base and pneumatic tires
  - M3A2 – M3A1 with shield added
  - M3A3 – M3A2 with different wheels and combat tires
  - M8 – M1 with new wheels with pneumatic tires

Selected variants
	M1A1 on carriage M1	M1A1 on carriage M8	M1A1 on carriage M3A3
Carriage type	box trail	box trail	split trail
Wheels	wooden, with steel rims	steel, with pneumatic tires	steel, with pneumatic tires
Shield	none	none	+
Length		3.68 m (12 ft 1 in)	3.94 m (12 ft 11 in)
Width		1.22 m (4 ft 0 in)	1.73 m (5 ft 8 in)
Height		0.94 m (3 ft 1 in)	1.18 m (3 ft 10 in)
Combat weight	576 kg (1,270 lb)	653 kg (1,440 lb)	1,009 kg (2,224 lb)
Travel weight	667 kg (1,470 lb)	653 kg (1,440 lb)	1,043 kg (2,299 lb)
Elevation	+5° to +45°	+5° to +45°	+9° to +50°
Traverse	6°	6°	45°
Transportation	6 mule loads	1/4 ton 4x4 truck, 7 mule loads, 9 parachute loads, plane or glider	1/4 ton 4x4 truck

== Self-propelled mounts ==
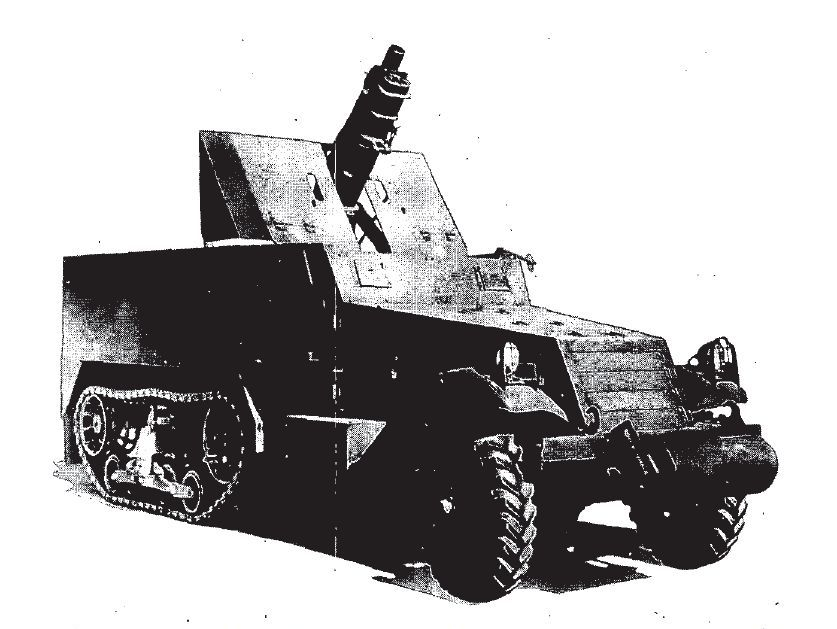
75 mm howitzer motor carriage T30

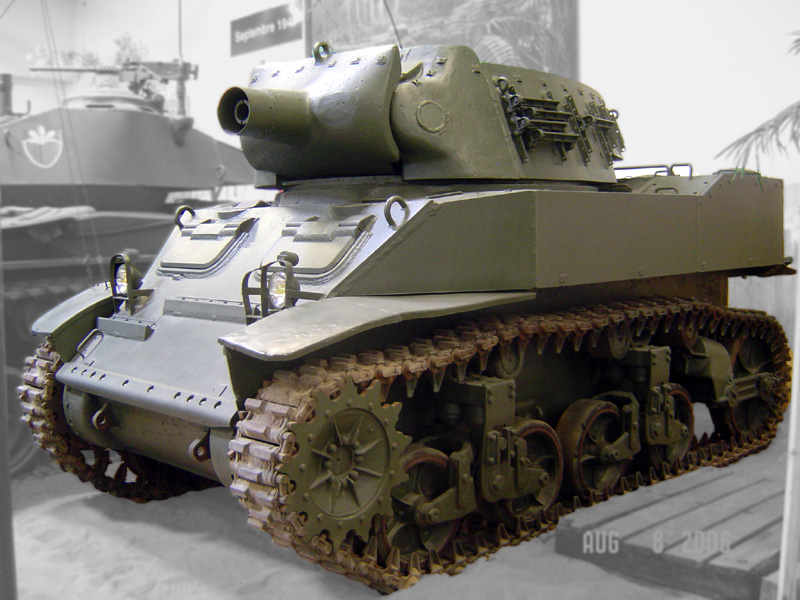
Howitzer motor carriage M8

Two nearly identical vehicle mounted variants – M2 and M3 – were developed based on tube and breech of the M1A1, for use in the 75 mm howitzer motor carriage T47 / M8. Both variants had a cylindrical "recoil surface" around the tube. In the M2, the surface was provided by use of a separately manufactured sleeve, while in the M3 it became an integral part of the barrel. M2 and M3 were fully interchangeable. These guns were mounted on the below armored vehicles:

- 75 mm howitzer motor carriage T47 / M8 – M2 / M3 in mount M7.
- Landing Vehicle Tracked (A)-4 – M3 in mount M7.
- Landing Vehicle Tracked (A)-5 – M3 in mount M12.

In addition, M1 / M1A1 was mated to a number of other vehicles. Only the T30 reached mass production.

- Medium Tank T5E2 – M1A1.
- Experimental mount on Holt light tractor.
- 75 mm howitzer motor carriage T1 (tank development chassis T2).
- 75 mm howitzer motor carriage T3 (combat car M1 chassis).
- 75 mm howitzer motor carriage T17 (combat car M1E3 chassis).
- 75 mm howitzer motor carriage T18 (light tank M3 chassis) – M1A1.
- 75 mm howitzer motor carriage T30 – M1A1 in mount T10.
- 75 mm howitzer motor carriage T41 (light tank M5 chassis).

== Ammunition ==
The gun fired fixed (HEAT M66) and semi-fixed ammunition, fitted with 75 mm cartridge case M5A1 (type II) and (type I) accordingly. The propelling charge of the semi-fixed ammunition consisted of base charge and three incremental charges, forming four different charges from 1 (the smallest) to 4 (the largest).

HEAT M66 shell penetrated about 91 mm (3.6 in) of homogeneous armor at 0 degrees at any range. While the powder charge was different, this gun fired the same types of shell projectiles as used in the 75 mm tank guns of WWII, which were themselves derived from the 75×350 mm R ammunition of the French 75mm field gun of WWI.

Available ammunition.
Model	Type	Weight, kg (round/projectile)	Filler	Muzzle velocity	Range
HE M48 shell	HE	8.27 kg (18.2 lb)8.27 / 6.62 kg (14.6 lb)6.62	TNT, 1.49 lbs [676 g] (2828 kJ)	381 m/s (1,250 ft/s)	8,790 m (9,610 yd)
HE M41A1 shell	HE	7.89 kg (17.4 lb) / 6.24 kg (13.8 lb)	TNT, 1.10 lbs [503 g] (2104 kJ)	381 m/s (1,250 ft/s)	8,820 m (9,650 yd)
HEAT M66 shell	HEAT-T	7.39 kg (16.3 lb) / 5.94 kg (13.1 lb)		305 m/s (1,000 ft/s)	6,400 m (7,000 yd)
WP M64 shell	Smoke	8.56 kg (18.9 lb) / 6.91 kg (15.2 lb)	White phosphorus	381 m/s (1,250 ft/s)	8,790 m (9,610 yd)
FS M64 shell	Smoke	8.64 kg (19.0 lb) / 6.99 kg (15.4 lb)	Sulfur trioxide in Chlorosulfonic acid	381 m/s (1,250 ft/s)	8,790 m (9,610 yd)
H M64 shell	Chemical	8.43 kg (18.6 lb) / 6.78 kg (14.9 lb)	Mustard gas	381 m/s (1,250 ft/s)	8,790 m (9,610 yd)
Drill cartridge M2A2	Drill			–	–
Drill cartridge M19	Drill (simulates HE M48)			–	–
CTG, 75 mm blank M337A2†	Blank		Black powder (cartridge)	–	–

† - The blank likely existed as M337, M337A and M337A1 based on US Army model numbering convention.

== Users ==
- Bolivia
- Brazil
- Cameroon
- China − Captured from Nationalist forces during the Chinese Civil War
- Colombia − 20 delivered during WWII, used as late as 1984
- Congo
- Croatia − 12 are kept in active service primarily as ceremonial cannons.
- Cuba − At least 4 were delivered after WWII
- Cyprus
- Ethiopia
- France
- Greece
- Guatemala
- Haiti
- Honduras
- India
- Iran
- Iraq
- Japan
- South Korea − A total of 24 M1s were supplied to the Army in August 1950. These were quickly replaced with M2A1 howitzers starting in October.
- Laos − supplied to the Royal Lao Army during the First Indochina War and used during the Laotian Civil War.
- Liberia
- Mexico
- Morocco
- Nepal
- Oman
- Pakistan
- Paraguay
- Philippines
- Senegal
- Taiwan
- Thailand
- Turkey
- United States
- United Kingdom
- Venezuela
- South Vietnam − ARVN used this howitzer during the Vietnam War. Some of them were captured by Northern Vietnamese Forces.
- Vietnam − Viet Minh and People's Army of Vietnam
- Yugoslavia
- Zaire

== See also ==
- Skoda 75 mm Model 1928
- 7.5 cm KwK 37, the closest WW II German vehicular-mount equivalent to the M2 and M3 versions
- List of U.S. Army weapons by supply catalog designation SNL C-20
- Artillery observer

== Sources ==
- Bidwell, Brigadier Shelford, ed. (1977). Brassey's artillery of the world: guns, howitzers, mortars, guided weapons, rockets, and ancillary equipment in service with the regular and reserve forces of all nations. New York: Bonanza Books. ISBN 978-0-517-27718-8.
- English, Adrian J. (1984). Armed Forces of Latin America: Their Histories, Development, Present Strength, and Military Potential. London: Jane's Publishing Inc. ISBN 9780710603210.
- Foss, Christopher F, ed. (1979). Jane's Armour and Artillery 1979–80 (1st ed.). London: Jane's Publishing Company. ISBN 0-354-00588-X.
- Hogg, Ian V. (1998). Allied Artillery of World War Two. Crowood Press, Ramsbury. ISBN 1-86126-165-9.
- Hunnicutt, R. P. (1992). Stuart: A History of the American Light Tank. Presidio Press. ISBN 0-89141-462-2.
- Hunnicutt, R. P. (1994). Sherman: A History of the American Medium Tank. Presidio Press. ISBN 0-89141-080-5.
- Hunnicutt, R. P. (2001). Half-Track: A History of American Semi-Tracked Vehicles. Presidio Press. ISBN 0-89141-742-7.
- Zaloga, Steven J. (2007a). US Field Artillery of World War II. New Vanguard 131. illustrated by Brian Delf. Osprey Publishing. ISBN 978-1-84603-061-1.
- Zaloga, Steven J. (2007b). US Airborne Divisions in the ETO 1944–45. Battle Orders 25. Osprey Publishing. ISBN 978-1-84603-118-2.
- Technical Manual TM 9-319, 75mm Howitzer M1A1 and Carriage M8. War Department, 1948.
- Technical Manual TM 9-1320, 75mm Howitzers and Carriages. War Department, 1944.
- Technical Manual TM 9-1901, Artillery Ammunition. War Department, 1944.
- Technical Manual TM 9-2005 volume 3, Infantry and Cavalry Accompanying Weapons. War Department, 1942.
- Handbook on the Chinese Communist Army, September 1952. U.S. Department of the Army. 1952.
- "History of U.S. Marine Corps Operations in World War II" – via HyperWar Foundation.
- "The Marine Division". WW2Gyrene.org. Archived from the original on 8 June 2019.
- Anderson, Rich. "US Army in World War II". Military History Online. Archived from the original on 22 June 2019.
- "US Guns in UK Service". British Artillery in World War II. 14 June 2014. Archived from the original on 2 February 2016.
