= Guiberson A-1020 =

Four-stroke diesel radial engine

A-1020 / T-1020
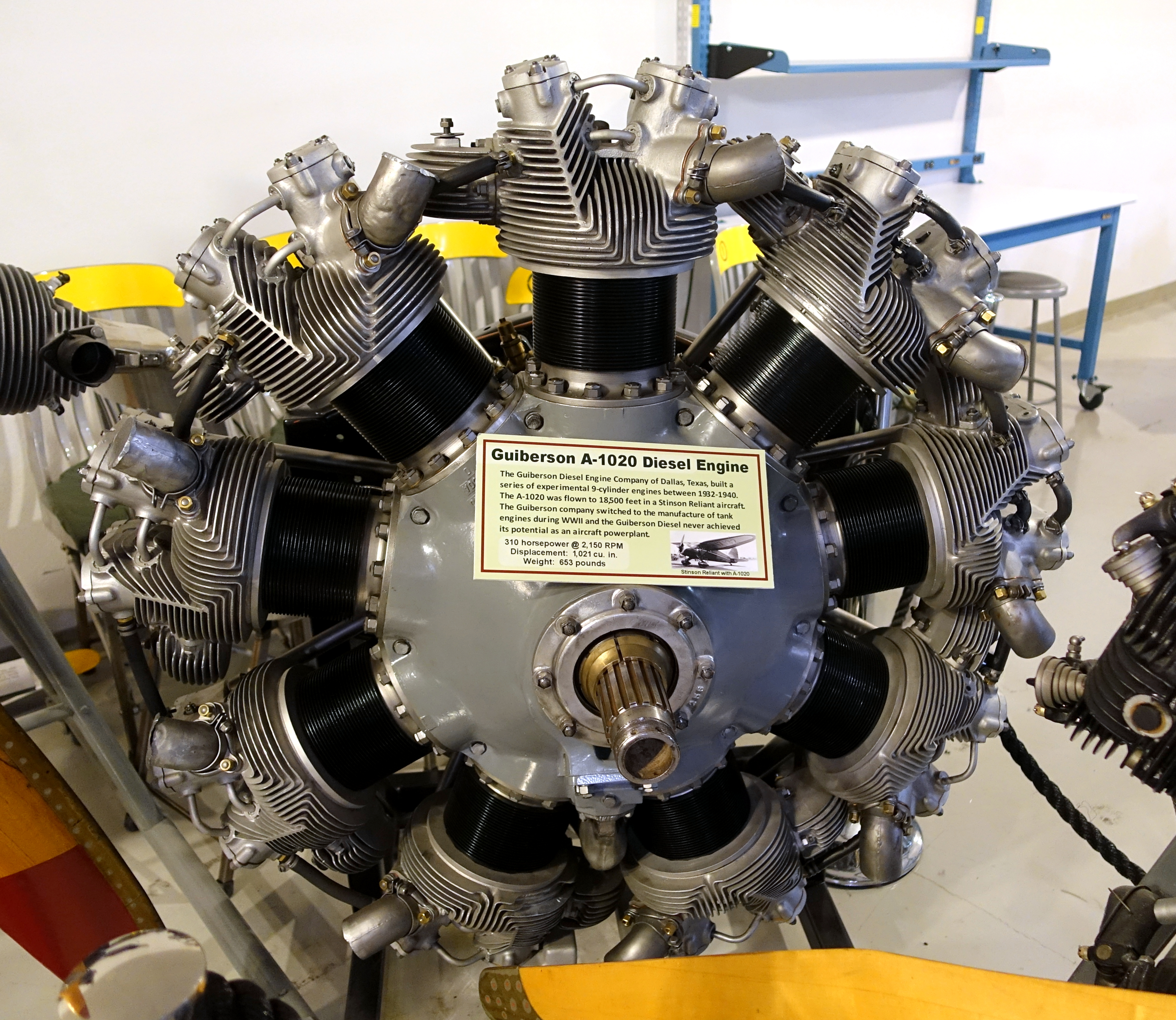
- A-1020 on display at the Hiller Aviation Museum
- Type: Diesel radial engine
- National origin: United States
- Manufacturer: Guiberson Diesel Engine Company
- Designer: Fred A. Thaheld
- First run: January 1940
- Major applications: Stinson Reliant

The Guiberson A-1020 is a four-stroke diesel radial engine developed for use in aircraft and tanks.

== Design and development ==
Development of the Guiberson diesel engine started in the 1930s with the A-918 and A-980 which was first flown in 1931. It is a single-row direct drive nine-cylinder four-cycle engine.

== Operational history ==
Production A-1020s and T-1020s were designed and sold by Guiberson and produced by Buda Engine Co.

== Variants ==
Guiberson A-918
Rated at 185 hp (138 kW) - one of the initial development models for use on aircraft.
Guiberson A-980
Rated at 210 hp (160 kW) - one of the initial development models for use on aircraft.
Guiberson A-1020
Rated at 310 hp (230 kW) - production engines for aircraft use.
Guiberson T-1020
Rated at 250 hp (190 kW) - for use in light tanks such as the M-3 Stuart

== Applications ==
- M3 Stuart light tank - T-1020
- Stinson Reliant - A-1020
- Waco 10 - A-980

== Surviving engines ==
- A T-1020 is on display at the New England Air Museum, Bradley International Airport, Windsor Locks, CT.

== Specifications (A-1020) ==
Data from Aircraft Diesels: Chapter 3 - The Guiberson Diesel

=== General characteristics ===
- Type: 9-cylinder air-cooled radial diesel piston engine
- Bore: 5.125 in (130.18 mm)
- Stroke: 5.5 in (139.70 mm)
- Displacement: 1,021 cu in (16.73 L)
- Length: 38.6 in (980 mm) including starter
- Diameter: 47.125 in (1,197.0 mm)
- Dry weight: 653 lb (296 kg)
- Designer: F. A. Thaheld

=== Components ===
- Valvetrain: two pushrod operated valves per cylinder, with de-compression device for hand-turning or free-wheeling.
- Fuel system: Guiberson system fuel injection
- Fuel type: Diesel Index No.50
- Cooling system: Air-cooled
- Reduction gear: Direct-drive
  - Eclipse inertia starter or Coffman cartridge starter

=== Performance ===
- Power output: 310 hp (230 kW), continuous at 2,150 rpm at sea level
- Compression ratio: 15:1
- Specific fuel consumption: 0.42 lb/(hp⋅h) (0.26 kg/kWh) at 2,150 rpm; 0.382 lb/(hp⋅h) (0.232 kg/kWh) at cruising speed
- Oil consumption: 0.02 lb/(hp⋅h) (0.012 kg/kWh) at 2,150 rpm
- Power-to-weight ratio: 0.475 hp/lb (0.781 kW/kg)
  - BMEP 113 psi (780 kPa) at rated output

== See also ==
- Clerget 9A
- Packard DR-980

Related lists

- List of aircraft engines
