= M3 Stuart =

WW2 American light tank

Light tank, M3 and M5
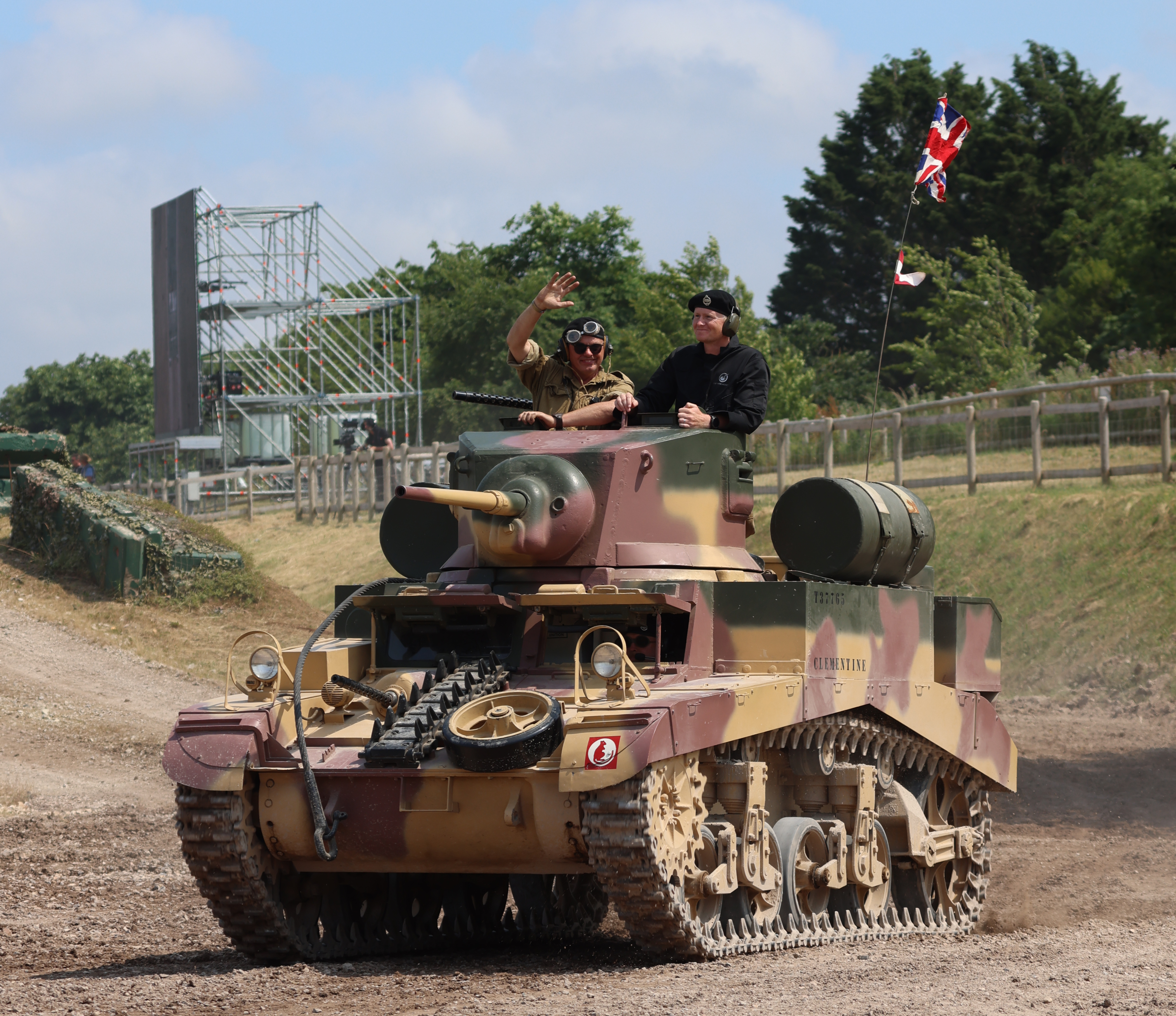
- M3A1 Stuart (T37765) at Tankfest 2023
- Type: Light tank
- Place of origin: United States

Service history
- In service: 1941–present
- Wars: World War II; Hukbalahap Rebellion; Indonesian National Revolution; Darul Islam rebellion; First Indochina War; Chinese Civil War; Indo-Pakistani War of 1947–1948; South Maluku rebellion; Korean War; Laotian Civil War; Portuguese Colonial War; PRRI rebellion; Permesta rebellion; 1959 Cuban Revolution; Indo-Pakistani war of 1965; Nicaraguan Revolution; 30 September Movement; Football War; Salvadoran Civil War

Production history
- Designer: U.S. Army Ordnance Department
- Manufacturer: American Car and Foundry Company; Cadillac division of General Motors; General Motors; Massey-Harris
- Unit cost: $32,915 (M3A1), $27,057 (M5)
- Produced: 1941–1944
- No. built: 22,744 M3 and M5
- Variants: See Variants

Specifications (M5A1, late production)
- Mass: 33,500 lb (15.20 metric tons)
- Length: 15 ft 10.5 in (4.84 m) with sand shields and rear stowage box
- Width: 7 ft 6 in (2.29 m) with sand shields
- Height: 8 ft 5 in (2.57 m) over anti-aircraft machine gun
- Crew: 4 (commander, gunner, driver, assistant driver)
- Armor: 0.375 to 2.0 in (9.5 to 50.8 mm)
- Main armament: 37 mm Gun M6 in Mount M44; 147 rounds
- Secondary armament: 3 × .30 caliber (7.62 mm) Browning M1919A4 machine guns 6,750 rounds
- Engine: Twin Cadillac Series 42; 220 hp (160 kW) at 3,400 rpm
- Power/weight: 13.14 horsepower per short ton (14.48 hp/t)
- Transmission: Hydramatic; 4 speeds forward, 1 reverse
- Suspension: Vertical volute spring suspension (VVSS)
- Fuel capacity: 89 U.S. gallons (340 liters; 74 imperial gallons)
- Operational range: 100 mi (160 km)
- Maximum speed: 36 mph (58 km/h) on road

The M3 Stuart/light tank M3 was a US light tank of World War II first introduced into service in the British Army in early 1941. Later, an improved version of the tank entered service as the M5 in 1942, to be supplied to British and other allied Commonwealth forces under lend-lease, prior to the entry of the United States into the war.

The British service name "Stuart" came from the U.S. Civil War Confederate general J. E. B. Stuart and was used for both the M3 and the derivative M5 light tank. Unofficially, they were also often called "Honeys" by the British, because of their smooth ride. In U.S. use, the tanks were officially known as "light tank M3" and "light tank M5".

Stuarts were first used in combat in the North African campaign; about 170 were used by the British forces in Operation Crusader (18 November – 30 December 1941). Stuarts were the first American-crewed tanks in World War II to engage the enemy in tank versus tank combat when used in the Philippines in December 1941 against the Japanese. Outside the Pacific War, in later years of WWII, the M3 was used for reconnaissance and screening.

== Development ==
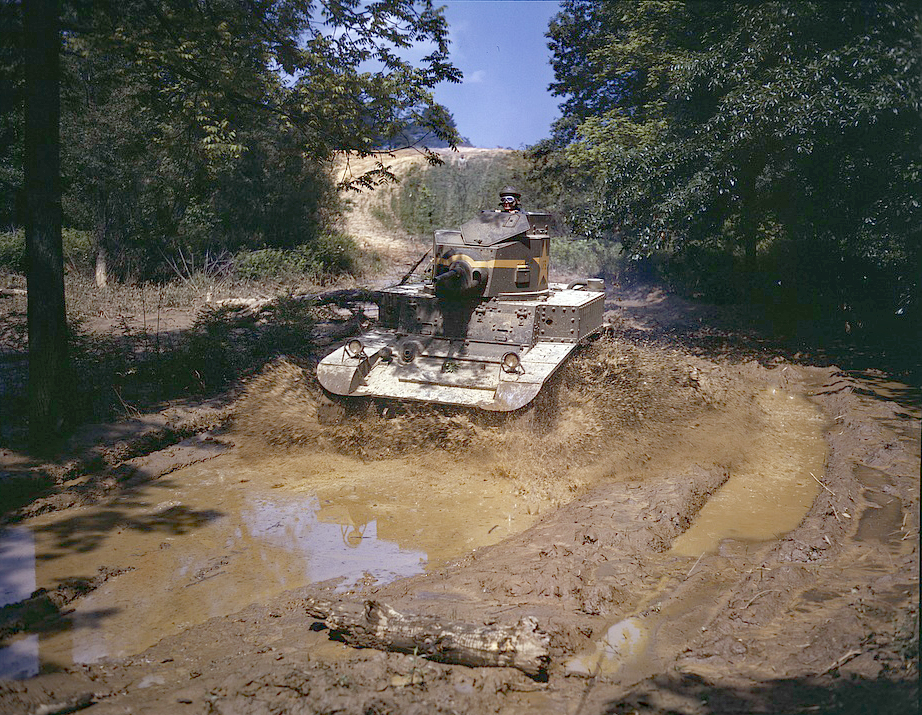
An M3 going through water obstacle, Fort Knox, Kentucky, United States

Observing events in Europe and Asia during World War II, American tank designers realized that the light tank M2 was becoming obsolete and set about improving it. The upgraded design, with thicker armor, modified suspension and new gun recoil system was called "light tank M3". Production of the vehicle started in March 1941 and continued until October 1943.

By the standards of the era for light tanks, the Stuart was fairly heavily armored. It had 38 mm of armor on the upper front hull, 44 mm on the lower front hull, 51 mm on the gun mantlet, 38 mm on the turret sides, 25 mm on the hull sides, and 25 mm on the hull rear. Like its direct predecessor, the M2A4, the M3 was initially armed with a 37 mm M5 gun and five .30-06 Browning M1919A4 machine guns: one coaxial with the main gun, one on top of the turret in an M20 anti-aircraft mount, another in a ball mount in right bow, and two more in the right and left hull sponsons. Later, the main gun was replaced with the slightly longer M6, and the sponson machine guns were removed.

The M3 and M3A1 variants were powered by an air-cooled radial engine, either a gasoline-fueled 7-cylinder Continental W-670 (8,936 built) or a 9-cylinder Guiberson T-1020 diesel (1,496 built). Both of these powerplants were originally developed as aircraft engines. Internally, the radial engine was at the rear and the transmission at the front of the tank's hull. The driveshaft connecting the engine and transmission ran through the middle of the fighting compartment. The radial engine's crankshaft was positioned high off the hull bottom and contributed to the tank's relatively tall profile. When a revolving turret floor was introduced in the M3 hybrid and M3A1, the crew had less room. A further 3,427 M3A3 variants were built with modified hull (similar to the M5), new turret and the Continental W-670 gasoline engine. In contrast to the M2A4, all M3/M5 series tanks had a trailing rear idler wheel for increased ground contact, whereas on the M2 the idler wheel was off the ground and did not aid in suspension.

=== M5 Stuart ===
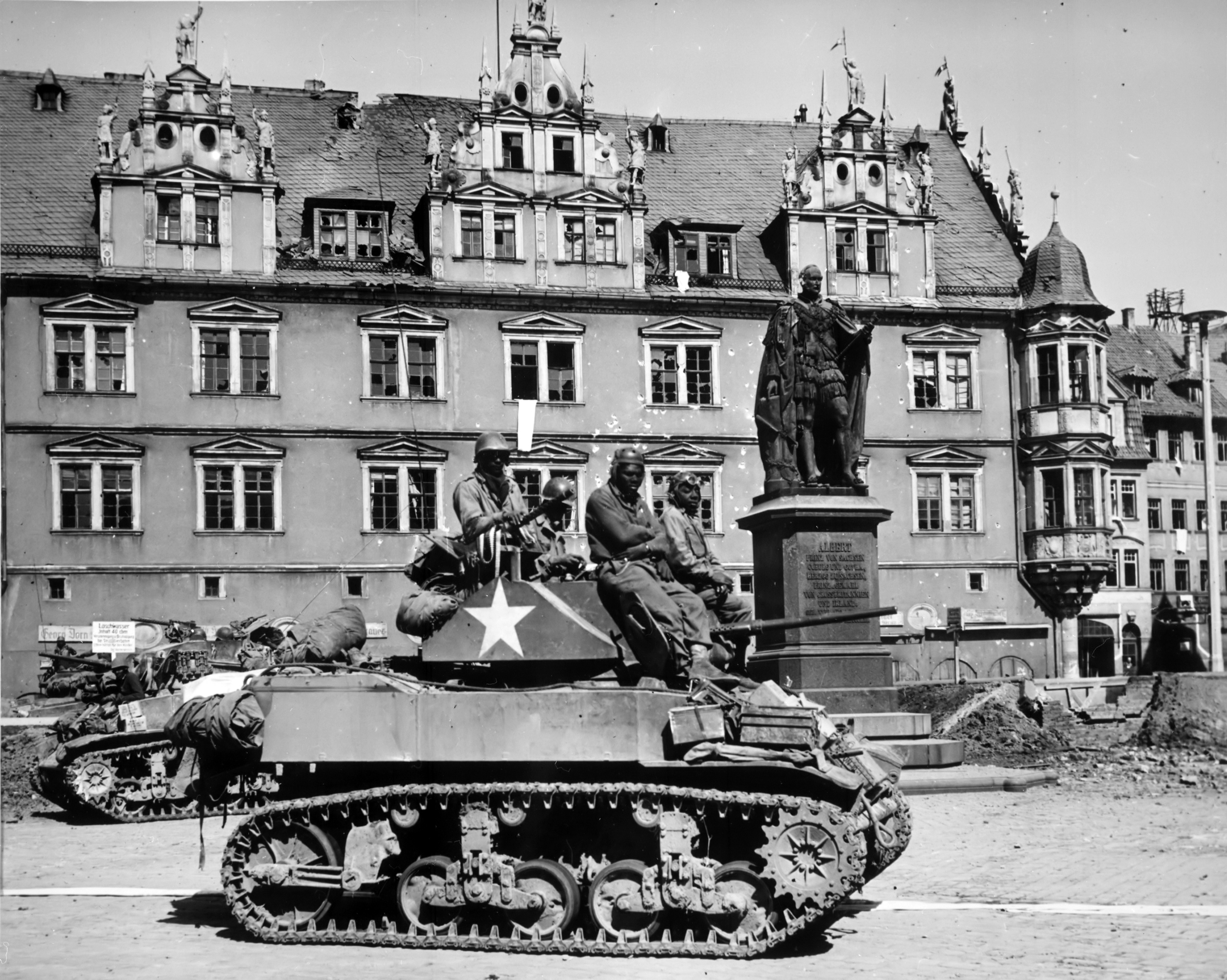
M5A1 crews from Company D, 761st Tank Battalion, stand by awaiting call to clean out scattered German machine gun nests in Coburg, Germany

To relieve wartime demand for the radial aero-engines used in the M3, a new version was developed using twin Cadillac V8 automobile engines and twin Hydra-Matic transmissions operating through a transfer case. This version of the tank was quieter, cooler and roomier; the automatic transmission also simplified crew training. The new model (initially called M4 but redesignated M5 to avoid confusion with the M4 Sherman) featured a redesigned hull with a raised rear deck over the engine compartment, sloped glacis plate and driver's hatches moved to the top. Although the main criticism from units using the Stuarts was that it lacked firepower, the improved M5 series kept the same 37 mm gun. The M5 gradually replaced the M3 in production from 1942 and, after the M7 project proved unsatisfactory, was succeeded by the light tank M24 in 1944. Total M5 and M5A1 tank production was 8,884; an additional 1,778 M8 75 mm howitzer motor carriages based on the M5 chassis with an open-top turret were produced.

Production of M3 and M5
| Month | M3 series | M5 series |
|---|---|---|
| March 1941 | 1 | |
| April 1941 | 127 | |
| May 1941 | 211 | |
| June 1941 | 221 | |
| July 1941 | 253 | |
| August 1941 | 281 | |
| September 1941 | 309 | |
| October 1941 | 400 | |
| November 1941 | 338 | |
| December 1941 | 410 | |
| January 1942 | 378 | |
| February 1942 | 363 | |
| March 1942 | 418 | |
| April 1942 | 544 | 3 |
| May 1942 | 619 | 16 |
| June 1942 | 711 | 60 |
| July 1942 | 762 | 127 |
| August 1942 | 694 | 268 |
| September 1942 | 620 | 449 |
| October 1942 | 944 | 593 |
| November 1942 | 199 | 605 |
| December 1942 | 1,587 | 737 |
| January 1943 | 104 | 401 |
| February 1943 | 443 | 400 |
| March 1943 | 475 | 402 |
| April 1943 | 475 | 293 |
| May 1943 | 475 | 260 |
| June 1943 | 475 | 283 |
| July 1943 | 475 | 351 |
| August 1943 | 500 | 403 |
| September 1943 | 47 | 198 |
| October 1943 | | 251 |
| November 1943 | | 348 |
| December 1943 | | 473 |
| January 1944 | | 490 |
| February 1944 | | 458 |
| March 1944 | | 513 |
| April 1944 | | 344 |
| May 1944 | | 134 |
| June 1944 | | 24 |
| Total | 13,859 | 8,884 |

== Light-tank doctrine ==
Light tanks were issued to tank battalions (one of the four companies was a light tank company), light tank battalions and cavalry reconnaissance squadrons. The original role of the light tank in these formations was similar to medium tanks and they were expected to engage enemy armor with AP rounds and enemy positions with HE rounds. As a result, tank gunnery training for light and medium tankers was common.

US Army Field Manuals written before 1944 clearly show that light tanks were to be part of an armored assault on enemy positions, and examples of fire on enemy armor were in these manuals. When pursuing an enemy, light tank battalions were expected to move parallel with enemy columns and, together with accompanying infantry and engineer units, seize "critical terrain that will block hostile retreat". Despite the fact that light tank platoons were not expected to function as a reconnaissance unit, they could be used for reconnaissance purposes. In this role, they were expected to remain behind the main reconnaissance force as the support element and augment the firepower whenever enemy contact was made.

== Combat history ==
[It] is apparent that a Light Tank Battalion, armed with only 37mm guns, unless very skillfully employed with Infantry, will suffer severe casualties in men and material. The Light Tank still has to depend on speed, maneuver, and selection of suitable targets if it is to be of very much use. In spite of the fact that the training of this Battalion was not pointed toward reconnaissance lines, we have been able to accomplish our missions with a Cavalry Reconnaissance Group with a much greater degree of success than in any other assignment to date.

— Major Loyal Fairall in After action report, 759th Light Tank Battalion, July 44 thru March 45

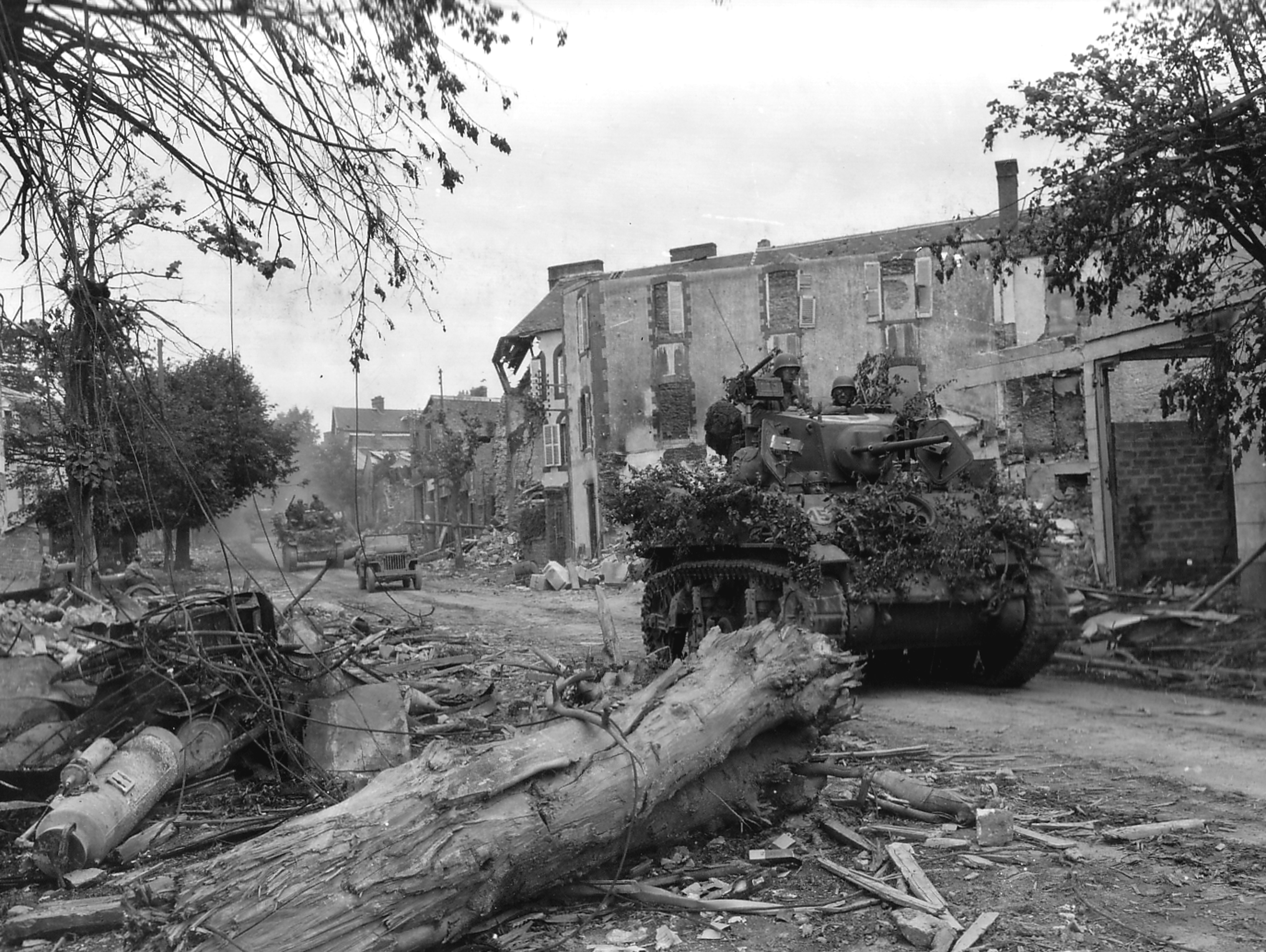
An M5A1 passing through the wrecked streets of Coutances, Normandy

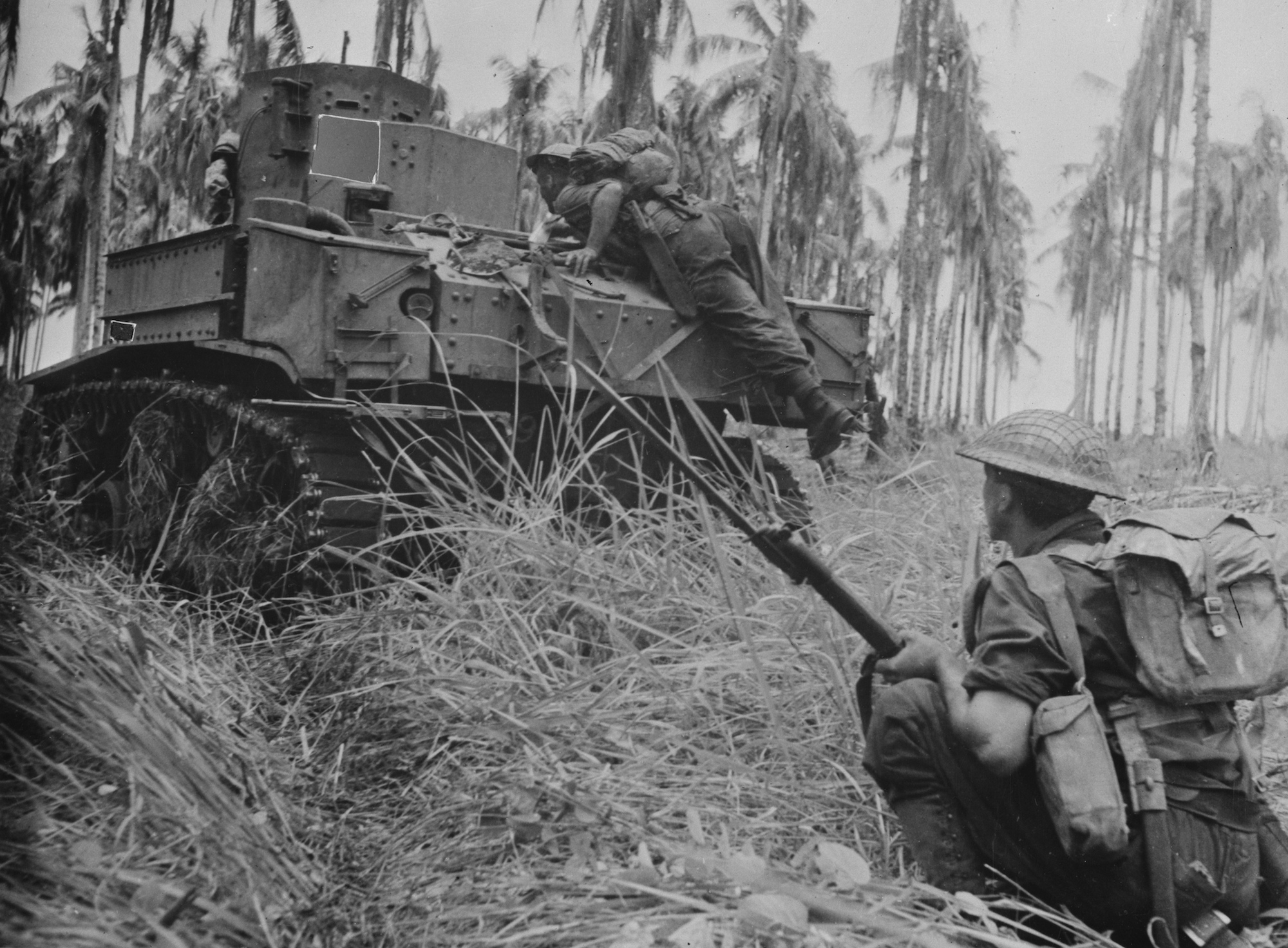
An Australian Stuart I during the final assault on Buna

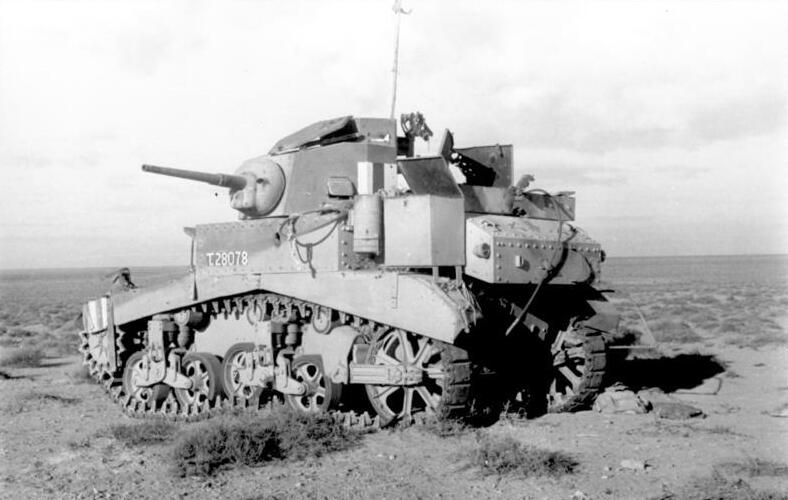
A British M3 (Stuart I) knocked out during fighting in North Africa

=== War in North Africa and Europe ===
British and other Commonwealth armies were the first to use the light tank M3, as the "Stuart", in combat. From mid-November 1941 to the end of the year, about 170 Stuarts (in a total force of over 700 tanks) took part in Operation Crusader during the North Africa Campaign, with poor results. This is despite the fact that the M3 was superior or comparable in most regards to most of the tanks used by the Axis forces. The most numerous German tank, the Panzer III Ausf G, had nearly identical armor and speed to the M3, (Note: The M3 actually had thicker front and turret armor, while the Panzer III had slightly thicker side armor.) and both tanks' guns could penetrate the other tank's front armor from beyond 1,000 m (3,300 ft). The most numerous Italian tank (and second most numerous Axis tank overall), the Fiat M13/40, was much slower than the Stuart, had slightly weaker armor all around, and could not penetrate the Stuart's front hull or turret armor at 1,000 meters, whereas the Stuart's gun could penetrate any spot on the M13/40. Although the high losses suffered by Stuart-equipped units during the operation had more to do with the better tactics and training of the Afrika Korps than the apparent superiority of German armored fighting vehicles used in the North African campaign, the operation revealed that the M3 had several technical faults. Mentioned in the British complaints were the 37 mm M5 gun and poor internal layout. The two-man turret crew was a significant weakness, and some British units tried to fight with three-man turret crews. The Stuart also had a limited range, which was a severe problem in the highly mobile desert warfare as units often outpaced their supplies and were stranded when they ran out of fuel. On the positive side, crews liked its relatively high speed and mechanical reliability, especially compared to the Crusader tank, which comprised a large portion of the British tank force in Africa up until 1942. The Crusader had similar armament and armor to the Stuart while being slower, less reliable, and several tons heavier. The Stuart also had the advantage of a gun that could deliver high-explosive shells; HE shells were not available for the 40 mm QF 2-pdr gun mounted by most Crusaders, severely limiting their use against emplaced anti-tank guns or infantry. (Note: However, by late 1942, the Crusader received the 57 mm QF 6-pdr gun, significantly improving its anti-tank characteristics and giving it HE capability) The main drawback of the Stuart was its low fuel capacity and range; its operational range was only 75 miles (121 km) cross country, roughly half that of the Crusader.

In the summer 1942, the British usually kept Stuarts out of tank-to-tank combat, using them primarily for reconnaissance. The turret was removed from some examples to save weight and improve speed and range. These became known as "Stuart Recce". Some others were converted to armored personnel carriers known as the "Stuart Kangaroo", and some were converted into command vehicles and known as "Stuart Command". M3s, M3A3s, and M5s continued in British service until the end of the war, but British units had a smaller proportion of these light tanks than U.S. units.

==== Eastern Front ====
The other major Lend-Lease recipient of the M3, the Soviet Union, was less happy with the tank, considering it under-gunned, under-armored, likely to catch fire, and too sensitive to fuel quality. The M3's radial aircraft engine required high-octane fuel, which complicated Soviet logistics as most of their tanks used diesel or low-octane fuel. High fuel consumption led to a poor range characteristic, especially sensitive for use as a reconnaissance vehicle. In the letter sent to Franklin Roosevelt (18 July 1942), Stalin wrote:

I consider it my duty to warn you that, according to our experts at the front, U.S. tanks catch fire very easily when hit from behind or from the side by anti-tank rifle bullets. The reason is that the high-grade gasoline used forms inside the tank a thick layer of highly inflammable fumes.

Also, compared to Soviet tanks, the M3's narrower tracks resulted in a higher ground pressure, getting them more easily stuck in the Rasputitsa muddy conditions of spring and autumn and winter snow conditions on the Eastern Front. In 1943, the Red Army tried out the M5 and decided that the upgraded design was not much better than the M3. Being less desperate than in 1941, the Soviets turned down an American offer to supply the M5. M3s continued in Red Army service at least until 1944.

==== Italy ====
One of the more successful uses of the M5 in combat came during the Battle of Anzio when breaking through German forces surrounding the beachhead. The tactics called for an initial breakthrough by a medium tank company to destroy the heavier defenses, followed by an infantry battalion who would attack the German troops who were being left behind the medium tanks. Since many hidden fortifications and positions would have survived the initial medium tank assault, the infantry would then be confronted by any remaining fortified German troops. Behind the infantry came the M5s of a light tank company, who would attack these positions when directed to by the infantry, usually by the use of green smoke grenades.

In the 1944 Liri Valley campaign, the official history of the 18th Battalion (New Zealand) notes that in the campaign (a war of movement) the regiment discovered that the Stuart recce tanks were an enormous advance on scout cars, and could go where not even jeeps could go. They carried commanders and engineers, and medical orderlies, and they could explore flanks while the Shermans forged ahead. They carried mobile wireless links and transported supplies up hilltops; they had a dozen different uses.

==== Yugoslavia ====
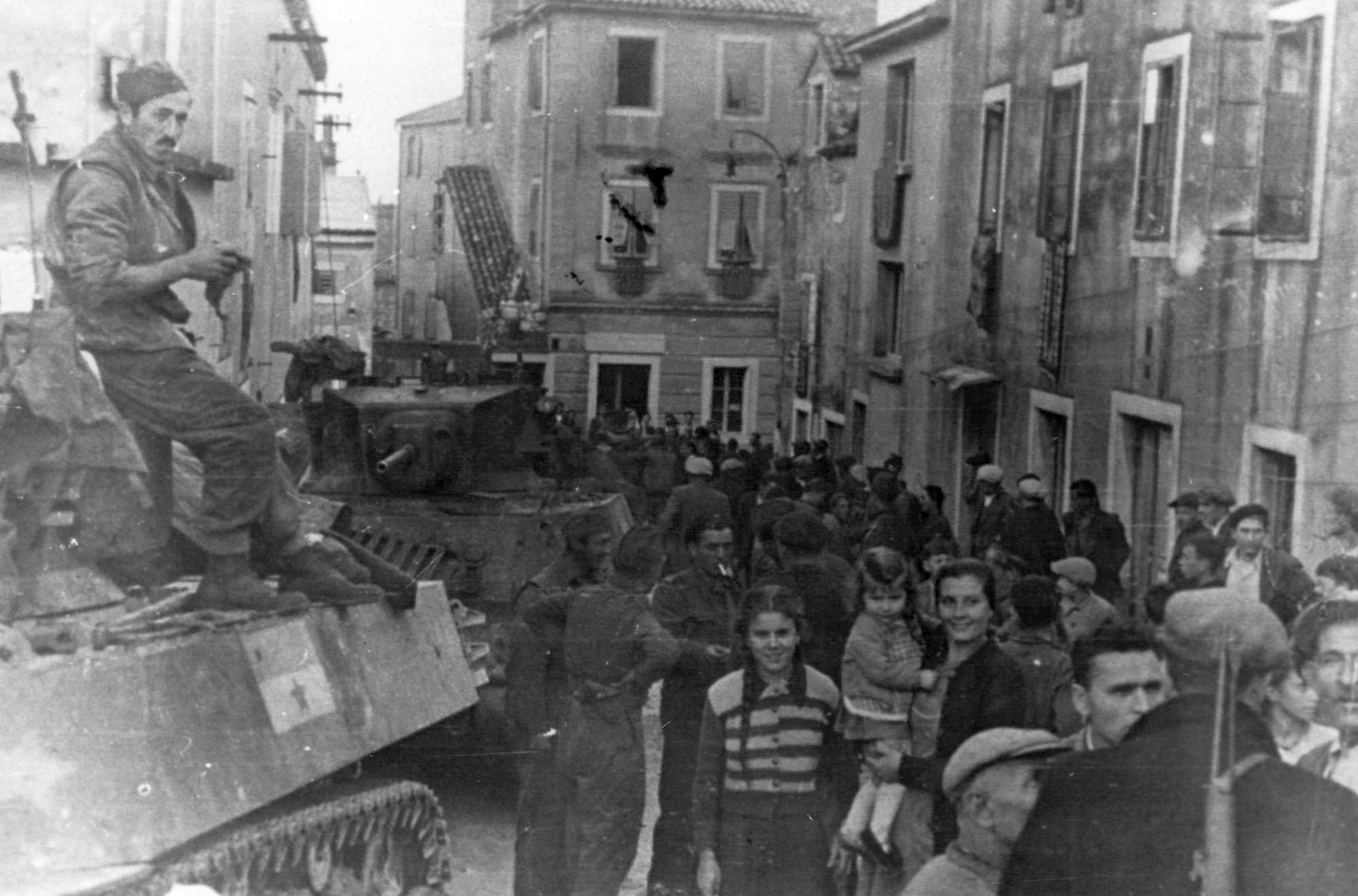
Stuarts of the 1st Tank Brigade and the men of the 1st Dalmatian Brigade, Šibenik, 1944

The 1st Tank Brigade of the 8th Corps (Yugoslav Partisans) was formed in 1944, primarily from POWs and defecting Dalmatians, Istrians, and Slovenes who had previously served in the armoured units of the Italian Army. The creation of the 1st Tank Brigade, equipped with British-supplied M3 Stuart tanks, marked a significant milestone in the evolution of the Yugoslav Partisan Army from a guerrilla force into a conventional military. These tanks, landed at Vis and later assembled on the mainland under the command of 26th Dalmatian shock division, gave the Dalmatian units much-needed armored support for the first time. The brigade played a vital role in the liberation of Dalmatia, providing direct fire and mobility in difficult coastal and mountainous terrain.

Following the battle of Knin, the 1st Tank Brigade continued its advance northward, supporting Dalmatian divisions in great battle from Lika to Soča. This offensive was in area over 300 kilometres (190 miles) culminating with the Race for Trieste. Despite limitations in terrain and logistics, the brigade's use of M3 Stuarts proved highly effective in breaking enemy defenses and supporting infantry assaults. After the war, the 8th Dalmatian Corps gained international recognition as the first resistance formation in occupied Europe to field an organized armored unit.

=== Pacific and Asia ===
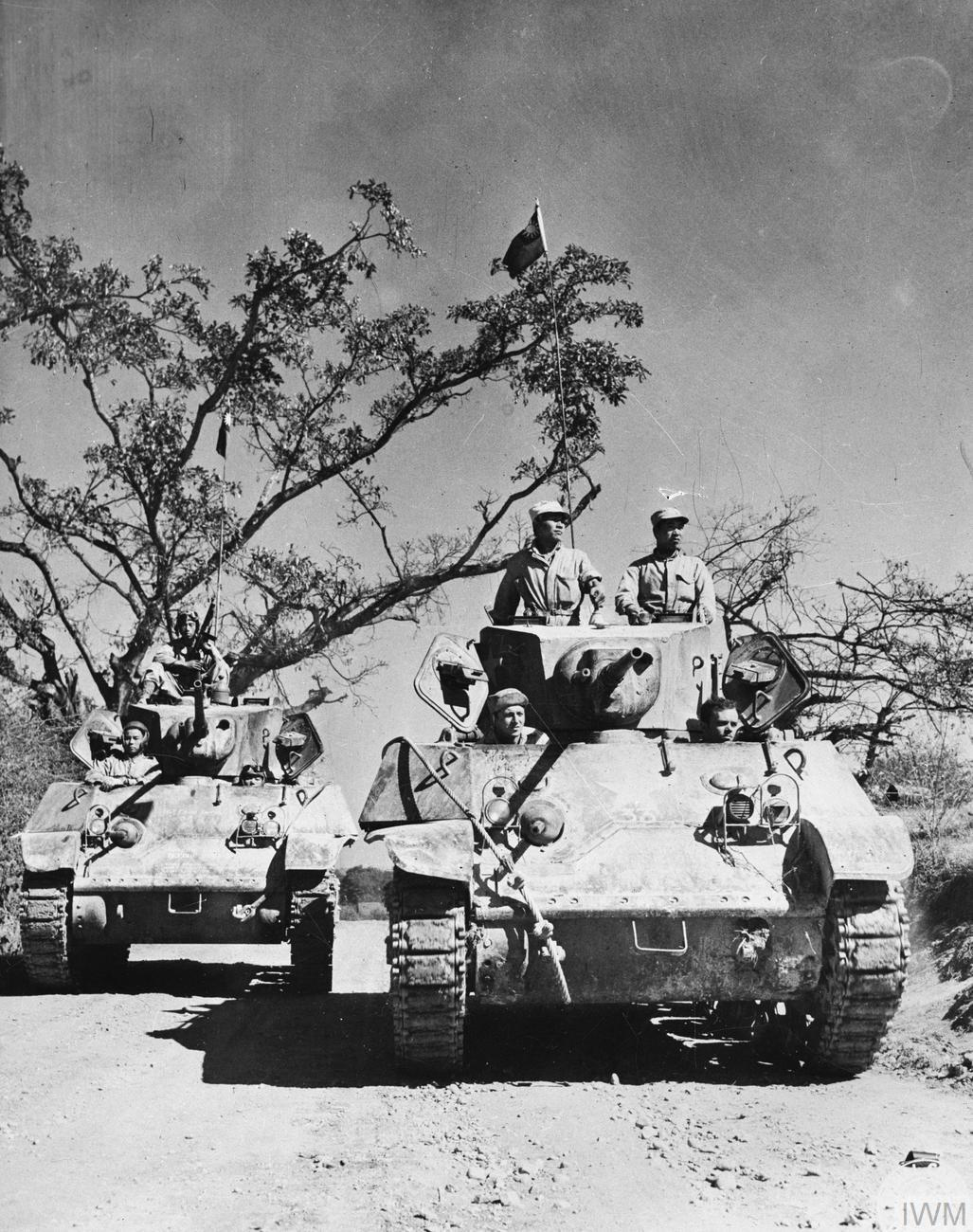
Republic of China army operating the M3A3 Stuart on Ledo Road

The U.S. Army initially deployed 108 Stuart light tanks to the Philippines in September 1941, equipping the U.S. Army's 194th and 192nd Tank Battalions. The first U.S. tank versus tank combat to occur in World War II happened on 22 December 1941 during the Philippines campaign (1941–1942) when a platoon of five M3s led by Lieutenant Ben R. Morin engaged the Imperial Japanese Army (IJA) 4th Tank Regiment's Type 95 Ha-Go light tanks north of Damortis. Morin, with his 37mm cannon locked in recoil maneuvered his M3 off the road, but took a direct hit while doing so, and his tank began to burn. The other four M3s were also hit, but managed to leave the field under their own power. Lt. Morin was wounded, and he and his crew were captured by the enemy. M3s of the 194th and 192nd Tank Battalions continued to skirmish with the 4th Tank Regiment's tanks as they continued their retreat down the Bataan Peninsula, with the last tank versus tank combat occurring on 7 April 1942.

As the Japanese 15th Army was threatening southern Burma toward the end of February 1942, 7th Armoured Brigade of the British Army landed at Rangoon with 114 M3 Stuarts bearing the green rodent of the "Desert Rats". They supported 17th Indian Division and 1st Burma Division on the retreat until they managed to escape to India in April.

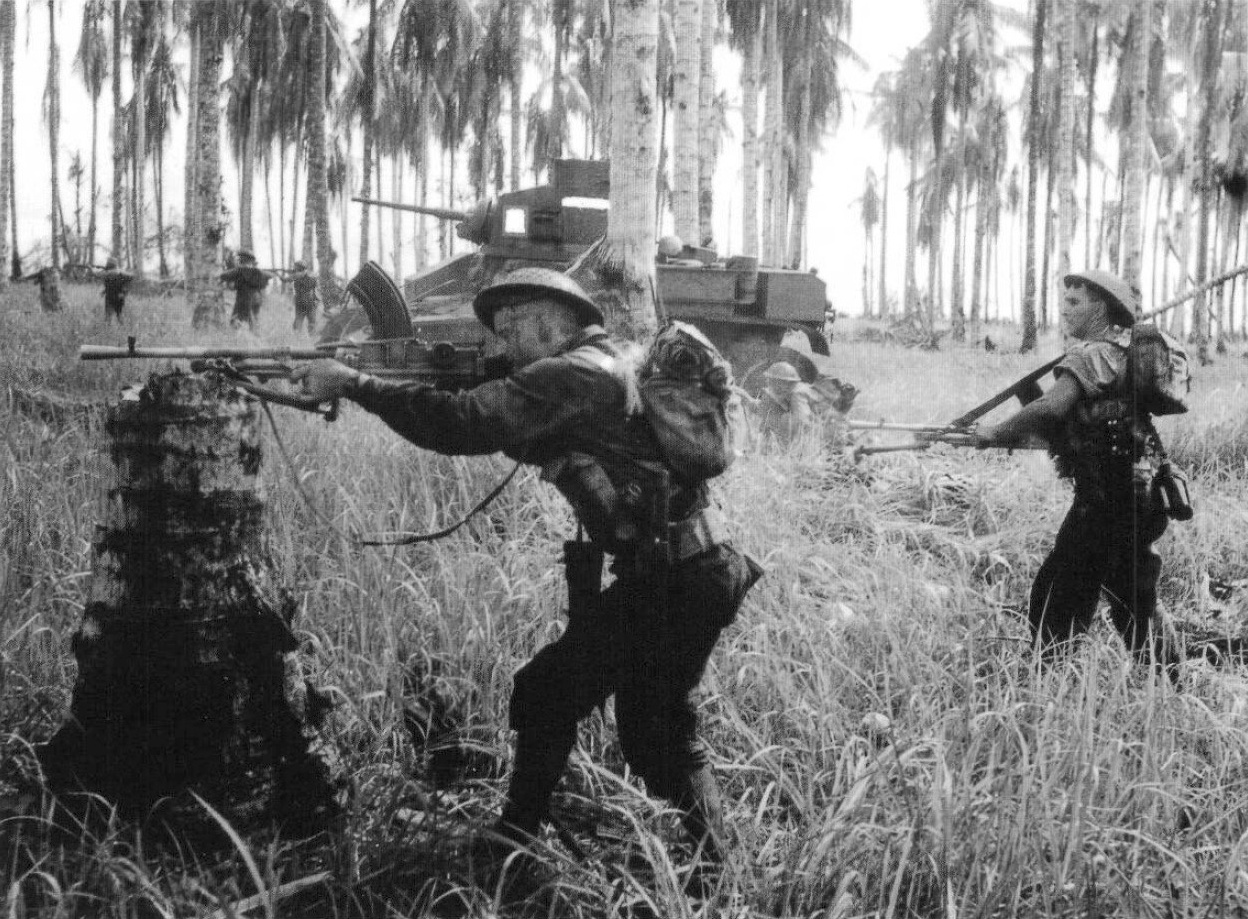
Australian assault on pillbox, January 1943, Papua, Giropa Point

Due to the naval nature of the Pacific campaign, steel for warship production took precedence over tanks for the IJA, creating by default an IJA light tank that performed admirably in the jungle terrain of the South Pacific. By the same measure, although the US was not hampered by industrial restrictions, the M3 proved to be an effective armored vehicle for fighting in jungle environments. At least one was captured in the Philippines.

With the IJA's drive toward India within the South-East Asian theatre of World War II, the United Kingdom hastily withdrew their 2nd Royal Tank Regiment and 7th Hussars Stuart tank units (which also contained some M2A4 light tanks) from North Africa, and deployed them against the Japanese 14th Tank Regiment. By the time the Japanese had been stopped at Imphal, only one British Stuart remained operational. When the U.S. entered the war in 1941, it began to supply China with AFVs, including M3 Stuarts, and later M4 Sherman medium tanks and M18 Hellcat tank destroyers, which trickled in through Burma.

Although the M3/M5 had proven effective in jungle warfare, by late 1943, U.S. Marine Corps tank battalions were transitioning from their M3/M5 light tanks to M4 medium tanks, mostly for the much greater high-explosive blast effect of the M4's 75mm gun, which fired a much larger shell with a heavier explosive payload.

=== Obsolescence and replacement ===
When the U.S. Army joined the North African Campaign in late 1942, Stuart units still formed a large part of its armor strength. After the disastrous Battle of Kasserine Pass, the U.S. quickly followed the British in disbanding most of their light tank battalions and reorganizing medium tank battalions to include one company of light tanks, where the Stuarts mostly performed the traditional cavalry missions of scouting and screening; for the rest of the war, most U.S. tank battalions had three companies of M4 Shermans and one company of M3s or M5/M5A1s.

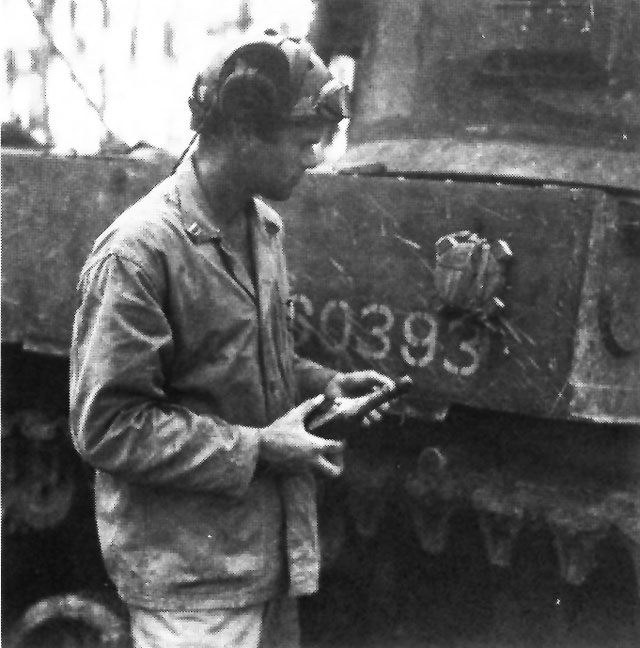
A Marine Captain inspects an un-exploded Type 99 mine attached to his M3A1 Stuart during the Battle of Munda Point in August 1943

In Europe, Allied light tanks were given cavalry and infantry fire support roles since their light main armament was not competitive against heavier enemy armored fighting vehicles. However, the Stuart was still effective in combat in the Pacific Theater, as Japanese tanks were both relatively rare and were lighter in armor than even Allied light tanks. Japanese infantrymen were not well equipped with anti-tank weapons, and as such had to use close assault tactics. In this environment, the Stuart was only moderately more vulnerable than medium tanks.

Though the Stuart was to be completely replaced by the newer M24 Chaffee, the number of M3s/M5s produced was so great (over 25,000 including the 75mm HMC M8) that the tank remained in service until the end of the war, and well after. In addition to the U.S., UK and Soviet Union, who were the primary users, it was also used by France (M3A3 and M5A1), China (M3A3s and, immediately post-war, M5A1s) and Josip Broz Tito's Partisans in Yugoslavia (M3A3s and few M3A1).

With the limitations of both the main gun (see below) and armor, the Stuart's intended combat role in Western Europe was changed significantly. Light tank companies were often paired with cavalry reconnaissance units, or else used for guarding or screening, and even used in supply or messenger roles for medium tank units. (Note: "At approximately 1720 hours on June 1st (the light tank) company... was called upon to move to the vicinity of 032465 (Velletri) to form an armored guard for the 85th Division C.P.. Three other light tanks of the company were used as liaison between the medium tanks companies of the regimental command post. This use of light tanks proved to be the most effective way of maintaining communication between the tanks and infantry regimental headquarters.")

==== Limitations of the 37mm gun ====
On 9 December 1944, the 759th Tank Battalion advanced on a hill near Bogheim but was subjected to a counter-attack by German forces, including a heavy self-propelled assault gun, which took "over 100 direct hits" at ranges as low as 75 yd (69 m) with "no appreciable damage".

In January 1945, a report to General Eisenhower concluded that the Stuart was "obsolete in every respect as a fighting tank" and that it would not "turn the German fire [n]or [would] the 37mm gun damage the German tanks or SP guns".

=== Post World War II use ===
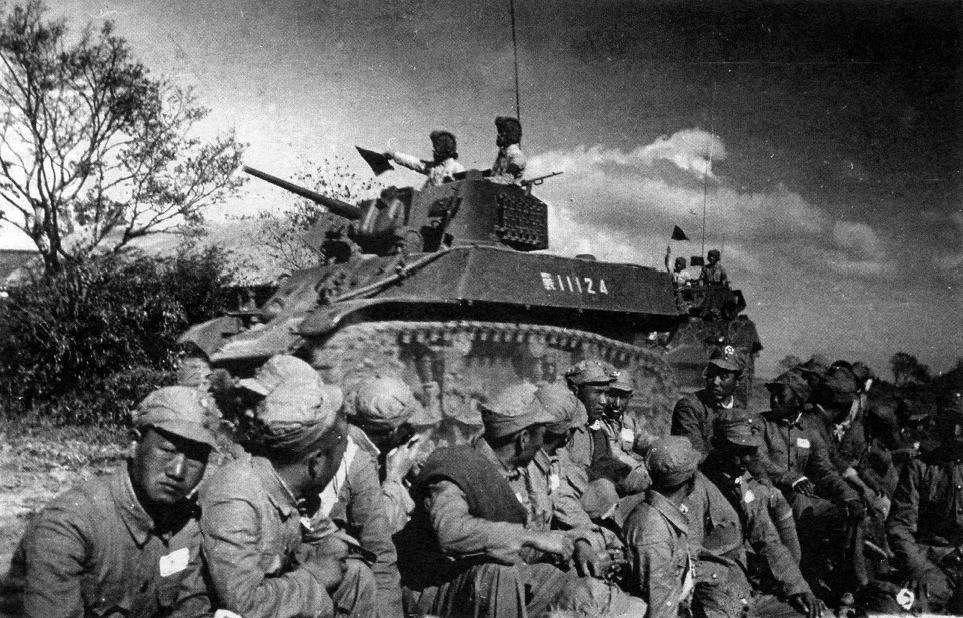
An M3A3 during the Chinese Civil War, 1949

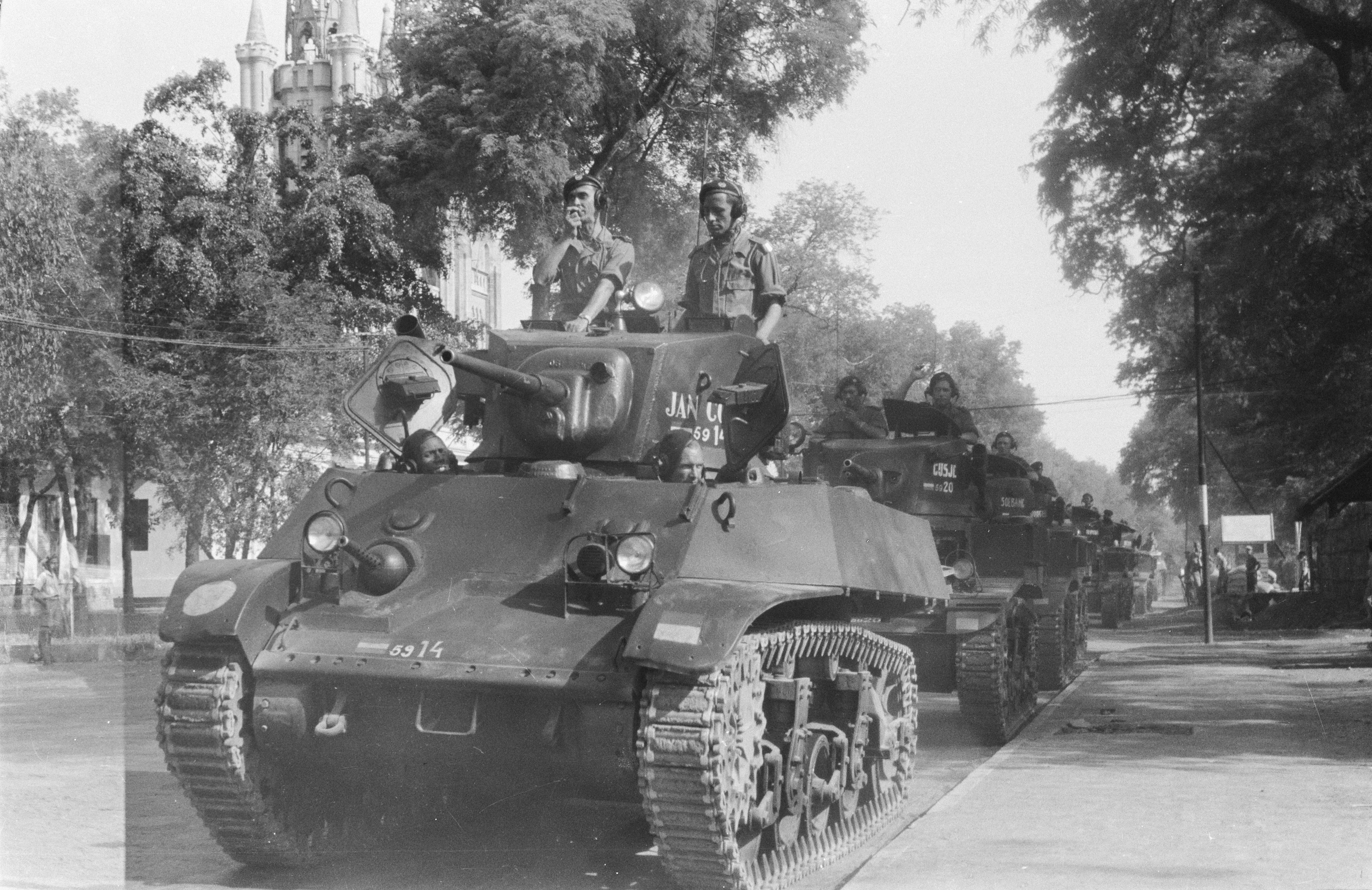
Dutch M3A3 and M3A1s column at Kemajoran, Batavia in November 1946.

After the war, some countries chose to equip their armies with cheap and reliable war surplus Stuarts. The Chinese Nationalist Army having suffered great attrition as a result of the ensuing civil war, rebuilt their armored forces by acquiring surplus vehicles left behind in the Philippines by the U.S. forces, including 21 M5A1s to equip two tank companies.

The M5 played a significant role in the First Kashmir War (1947) between India and Pakistan, including the battle of Zoji-la pass fought at an elevation of nearly 12,000 ft (3,700 m).

M3A1 and M3A3s were used by British forces in Indonesia during the Indonesian National Revolution, where they suffered heavy losses due to the Stuart's thin armor plating. They were used until 1946, when the British left. The M3A1 and M3A3s were then passed on to the Royal Netherlands East Indies Army, which used them until the end of the fighting before passing on the tanks to the Indonesian Army. The tank saw action during the Darul Islam rebellions in Aceh and Java, Republic of South Maluku rebellions in South Maluku, PRRI rebellions in Sumatra, Permesta rebellions in Northern Sulawesi and the fighting against the 30 September Movement.

During the 1960s and 1970s, the Portuguese Army also used a small number of M5A1 light tanks, out of a total of 90 received as military aid from Canada in 1956, in the war in Angola, where its all-terrain capability (compared to wheeled vehicles) was greatly appreciated. In 1967, the Portuguese Army deployed three M5A1 light tanks – nicknamed "Milocas", "Licas", and "Gina" by their crews – to northern Angola, which served with the 1927th Cavalry Battalion commanded by Cavalry Major João Mendes Paulo, stationed at Nambuangongo. The vehicles were mostly employed for convoy escort and recovery duties and limited counterinsurgency operations against National Liberation Front of Angola (FNLA) guerrillas, who dubbed them "Elefante Dundum". "Milocas" was destroyed by an accidental fire in 1969, while "Gina" and "Licas" were withdrawn from active service in 1972, the former being sent to Luanda and the latter ended up in 1973 as an airfield security pillbox in the Portuguese Air Force's Zala airfield. Period photographs show some modifications to the basic design, namely the omission of the bow machine gun, re-installed on a pintle mount in the roof of the turret, and a small searchlight fitted in front of the commander's cupola.

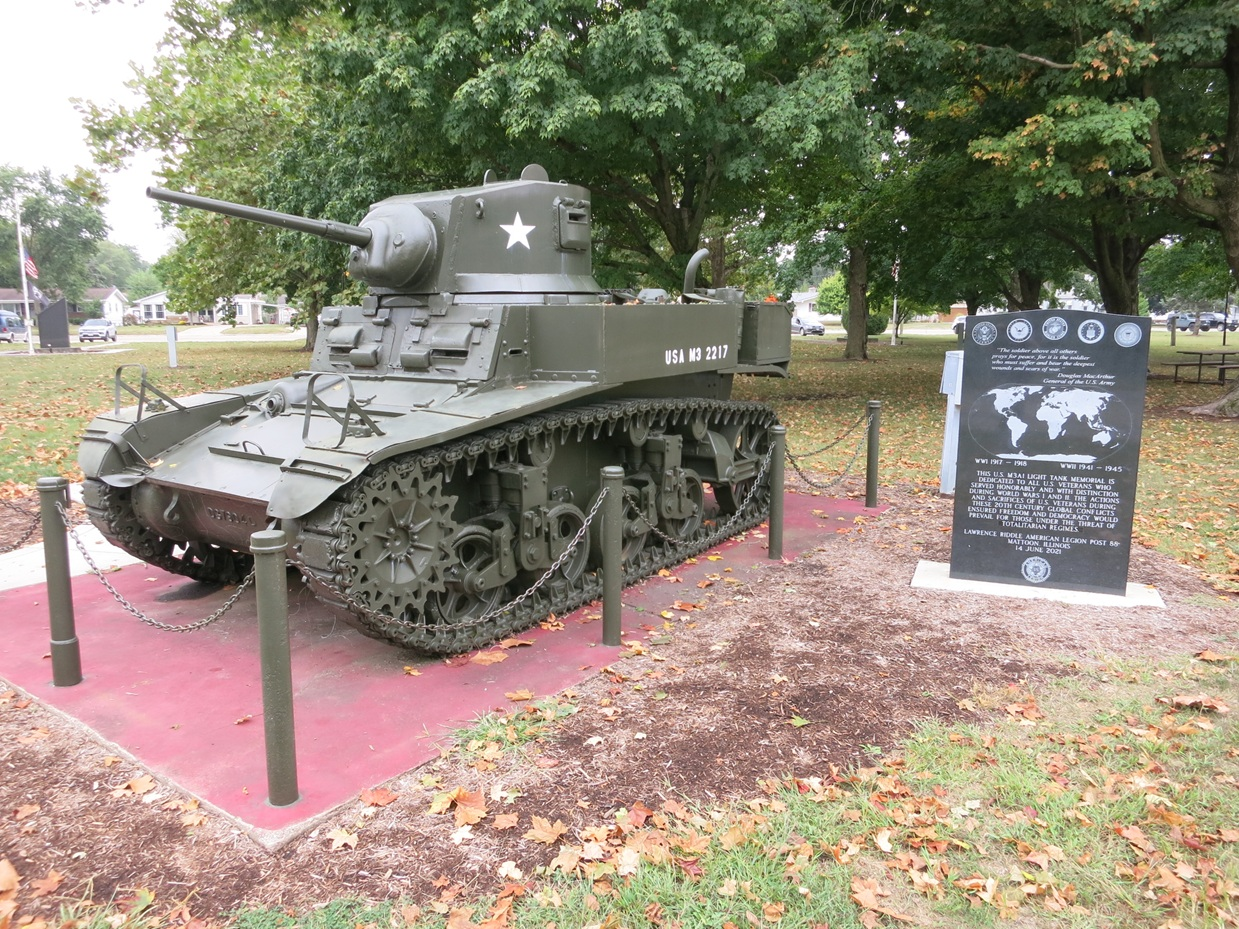
M3 Stuart tank is part of a veterans' memorial at Peterson Park in Mattoon, Illinois, since 1948.

During the four-day long Football War of 1969, El Salvador invaded Honduras in an all-out-war strike using the M3 Stuart as the main battle tank. El Salvador captured eight major cities before the Organization of American States arranged a ceasefire.

The South African Armoured Corps continued to use M3A1s in a reserve role until 1955. Some were refurbished locally in 1962 and remained in service as late as 1964. The fleet was withdrawn in 1968, owing to parts shortage.

The Stuart tanks saw combat with the Pakistan Army only once and that was during the 1965 War when they were assigned to a tank delivery unit. In an engagement, a lone Stuart commanded by Mohammad Saeed Tiwana inflicted heavy losses on an Indian Gurkha battalion attempting to retake a village after the ceasefire. By morning, Tiwana had captured 57 prisoners, including two officers, earning him the Sitara-e-Jurat for his actions.

The M3 Stuart is still on the active list in the Armed Forces of Paraguay, with ten of the tanks being overhauled in 2014 to provide a training capability. Ecuador also still has a number in service.

== Variants ==
=== US variants ===
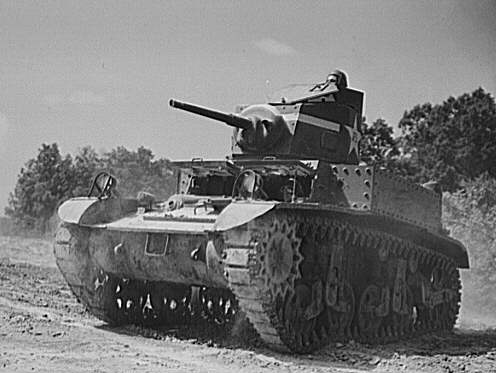
Light tank M3 in Fort Knox, 1942

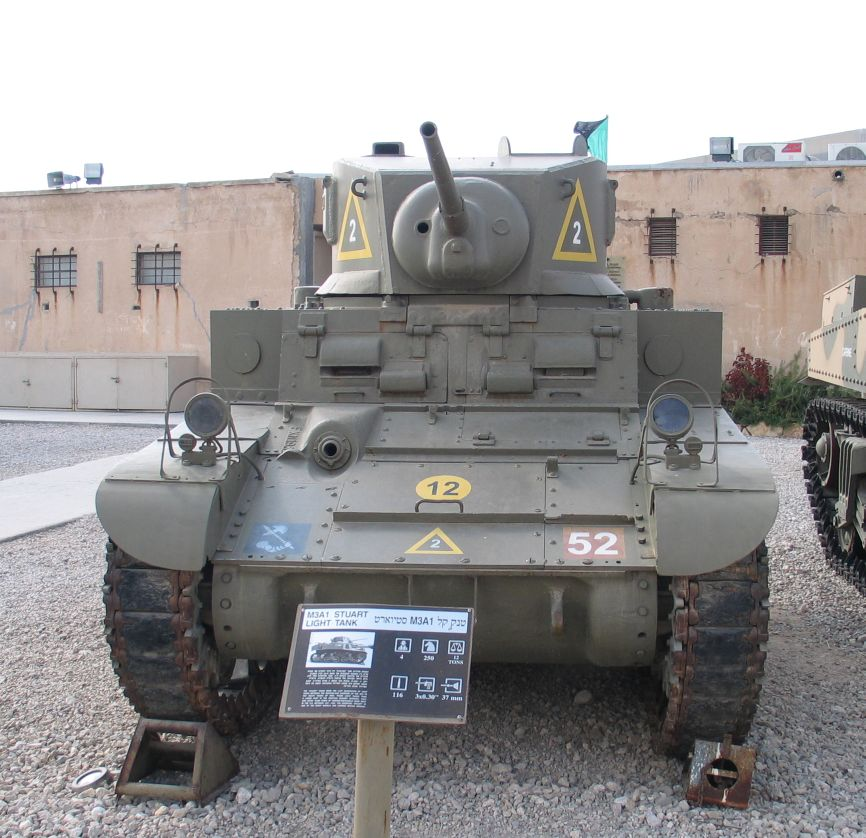
Light tank M3A1 in Yad la-Shiryon Museum, Israel

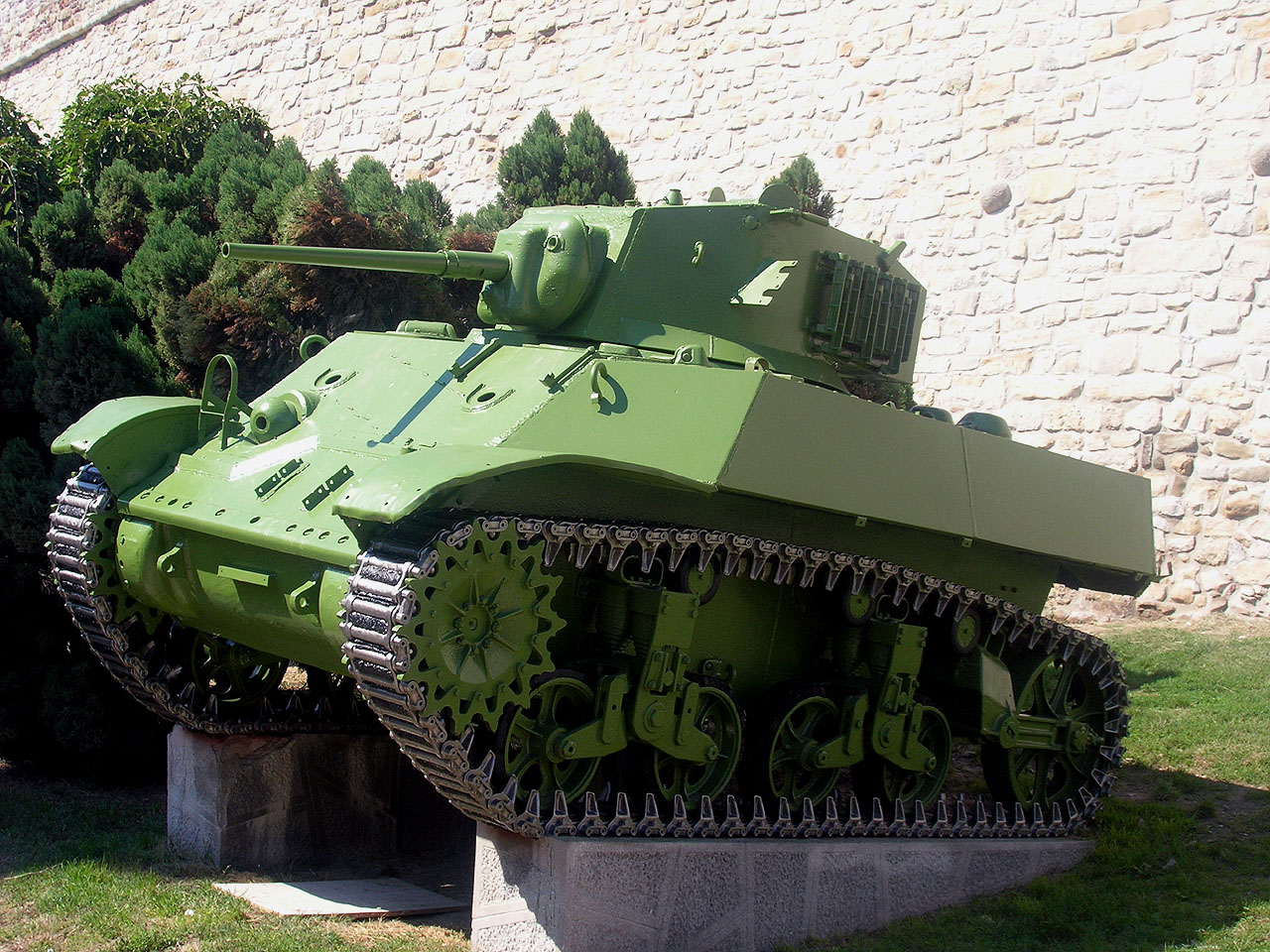
Light tank M3A3 at the Belgrade Military Museum, Serbia

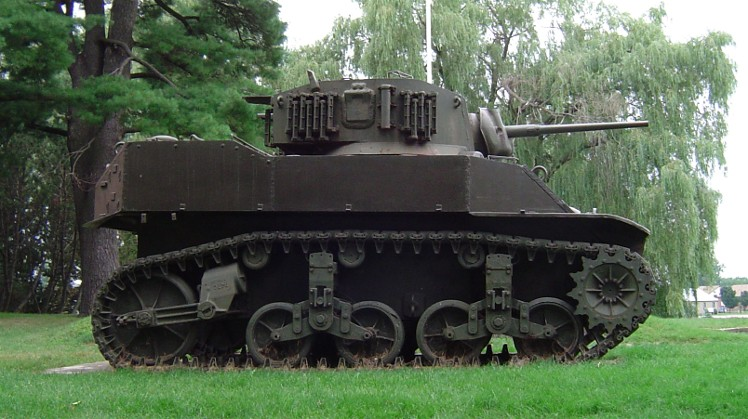
Early production light tank M5A1 at Worthington Tank Museum

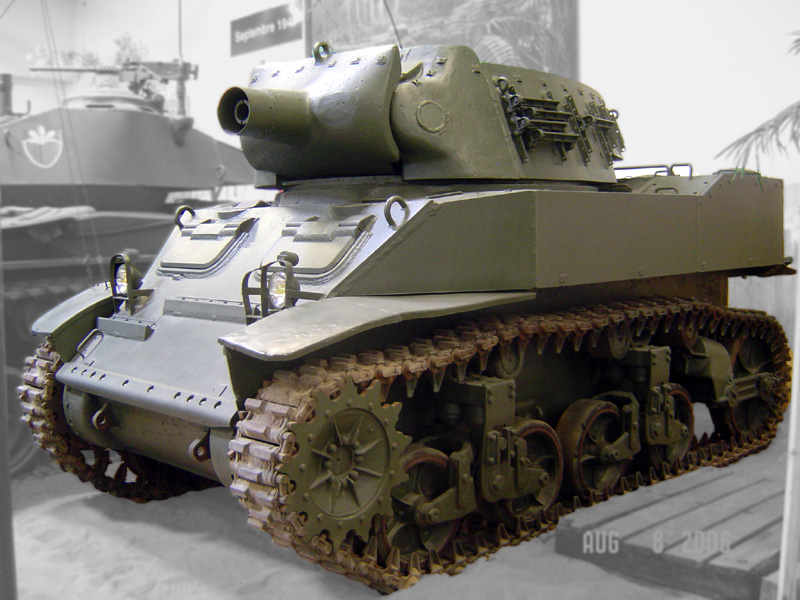
75 mm howitzer motor carriage M8 on display at the Musée des Blindés

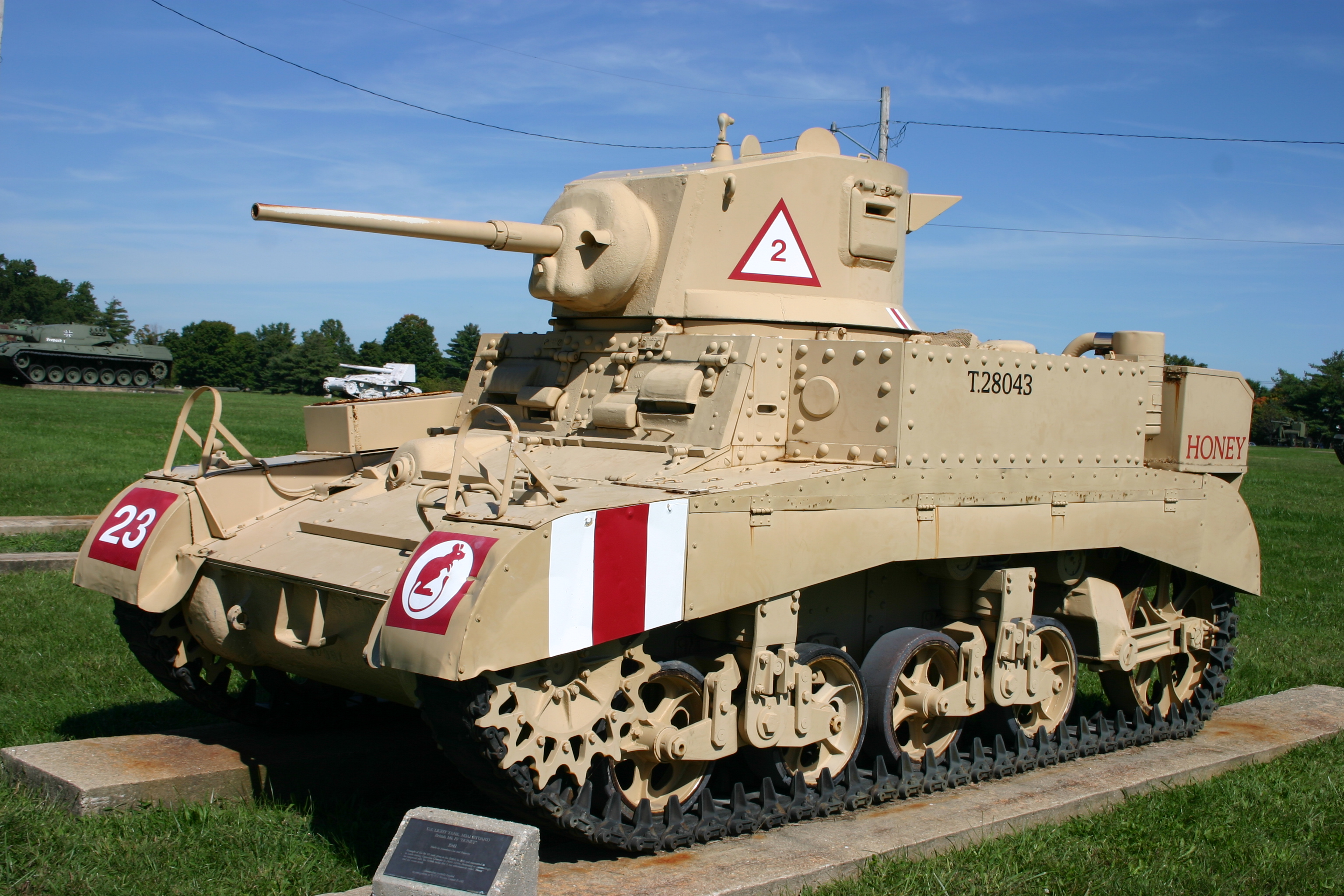
An M3A1 Stuart tank at Aberdeen Proving Ground

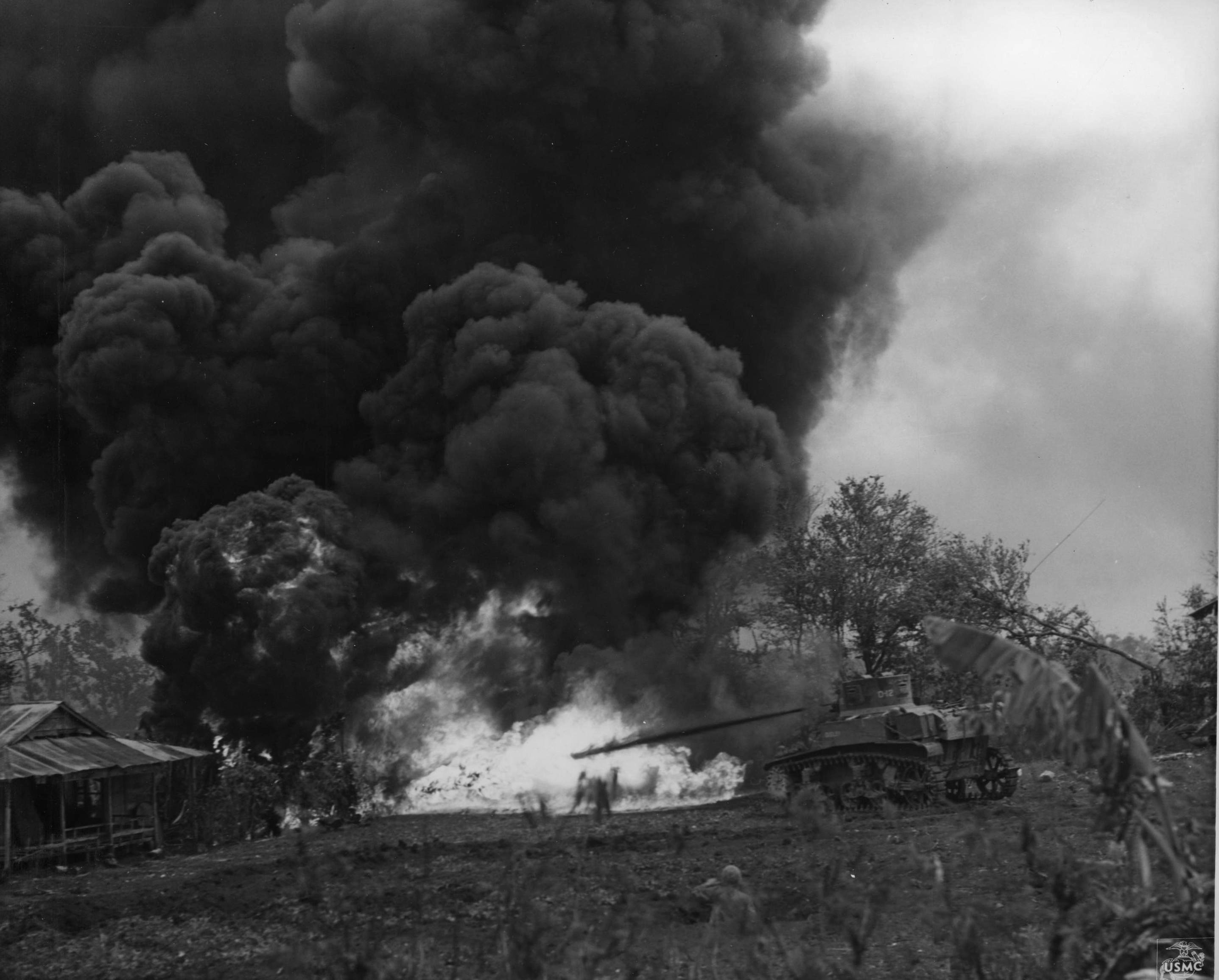
M3A1 Stuart with Canadian Ronson flamethrower on Saipan

- M3 (British designation "Stuart I")

5,811 vehicles were produced.
1,285 M3s had Guiberson diesel installed and were called "Stuart II" by British.
Late production M3s were fitted with turret developed for M3A1, though without turret basket. These tanks were dubbed "Stuart Hybrid".

- M3A1 (Stuart III)

4,621 were produced from May 1942 to February 1943.
New turret with turret basket and no cupola. Gun vertical stabilizer installed. Sponson machine guns were removed.
211 M3A1s with Guiberson diesel were called "Stuart IV" by British.

- M3A3 (Stuart V)

3,427 produced.
Put into production to integrate hull improvements brought by the M5 into the M3 series. Turret with rear overhang to house SCR-508 radio. Welded hull with sloped armor, 20° in from the vertical, on front and sides.

- M5 (no British designation)

2,074 produced.
Twin Cadillac engines. Redesigned hull similar to M3A3, but with vertical sides and raised engine deck. Turret as for M3A1.

- M5A1 (Stuart VI)

6,810 produced.
M5 with the turret of the M3A3; this was the major variant in US units by 1943.

- 75mm howitzer motor carriage M8

1,778 units produced between September 1942 and January 1944.
Based on M5 chassis. The gun was replaced with the 75 mm M2/M3 howitzer in open turret and a trailer hook was fitted so an ammunition trailer could be towed. Provided fire support to cavalry reconnaissance squadrons.

- T6 armored recovery vehicle

Armoured recovery vehicle based on the chassis of an M5A1. Project was discontinued in 1943 in favor of the M24 Chaffee-based T6E1.

- T16 4.5-inch gun motor carriage

Self-propelled 4.5-inch gun based on the chassis of an M5. Project was discontinued in 1943.

- T18 howitzer motor carriage

Self-propelled gun based on M3 chassis. 75 mm M1A1 pack howitzer was mounted in a boxy superstructure. The project started in September 1941 and was abandoned in April 1942. Only two were produced, 75 mm howitzer motor carriage M8 was chosen to be produced instead.

- T27 / T27E1 mortar motor carriage

M5A1 with turret replaced by superstructure in which an 81 mm mortar was installed. Also carried .50 (12.7 mm) cal Browning M2HB machine gun. The project was abandoned in April 1944 because of inadequate crew and storage space.

- T29 mortar motor carriage

Design similar to T27, with 4.2 inch (107 mm) mortar. Was abandoned for the same reason.

- T56 gun motor carriage

Self-propelled gun based on M3A3 chassis. The engine was moved to the middle of the hull and a 3-inch (76 mm) gun was mounted in a superstructure in the rear. The project started in September 1942 and was abandoned in February 1943.

- T57 gun motor carriage

Variant of T56 with Continental engine of the Medium Tank M3. Also dropped in February 1943.

- T81 chemical mortar motor carriage

M5A1-based 4.2 inch (107 mm) chemical mortar carrier.

- T82 howitzer motor carriage

Self-propelled 105 mm howitzer based on M5A1 chassis. Development began in 1943. Two prototypes built and tested in August 1944 at Aberdeen Proving Grounds. Project was discontinued on 21 June 1945.

- M3 with Maxson turret

Anti-aircraft variant developed in 1942. Was armed with four .50 (12.7 mm) cal. machine guns in a turret developed by Maxson Corp. The project was rejected because of the availability of the M16 MGMC.

- 155 mm howitzer motor carriage T64

Self-propelled howitzer based on lengthened M5 with 155 mm howitzer M1. One built, but replaced by the M41 howitzer motor carriage based on the light tank M24 chassis.

- 40 mm gun motor carriage T65

Anti-aircraft vehicle based on lengthened M5A1 with Bofors 40 mm gun. Not proceeded with but ideas used in developing M19 multiple gun motor carriage using the light tank M24 chassis.

- 20 mm multiple gun motor carriage T85

Anti-aircraft vehicle based on same chassis as T65 (M5A1). Armed with quad Oerlikon 20 mm cannons.

- M3/M5 command tank

M3/M5 with turret replaced by small superstructure with a .50 (12.7 mm) cal. machine gun.

- T8 reconnaissance vehicle

M5 with turret removed and mounting for .50 (12.7 mm) cal machine gun.

- M3 with T2 light mine exploder

Developed in 1942, was rejected.

- M3/M3A1 with Ronson flamethrower replacing the main gun. 24 tanks were converted by Seabees for the US Marine Corps in 1943. Given the success of the Satan in the Pacific, a second series of 24 tanks was released in September 1944, 6 of which were delivered to the Kuomintang through the US military aid Prêt-bail program.
- M5A1 with E5R1-M3 flame gun

Flame thrower installed instead of the hull machine gun.

- M3A1 with E5R2-M3 flame gun

Flame thrower installed in place of hull machine gun.

- M5 dozer

M5 with dozer blade. Turret was usually removed.

- M5 with T39 rocket launcher

T39 launcher with 20 7.2-inch (18 cm) rockets mounted on the top of the turret. Never reached production.

- M5A1 with E7-7 flame gun

Flame thrower installed instead of the main gun.

- M5A1 with E9-9 flame-throwing equipment

Prototype only.

- M5A1 with E8 flame gun

Turret replaced by boxy superstructure with flame thrower in a smaller turret. Prototype only.

=== Other US developments ===
The amphibious Landing Vehicle Tracked LVT(A)-1 had a turret that was nearly identical to that of the M3 Stuart.

=== UK variants ===
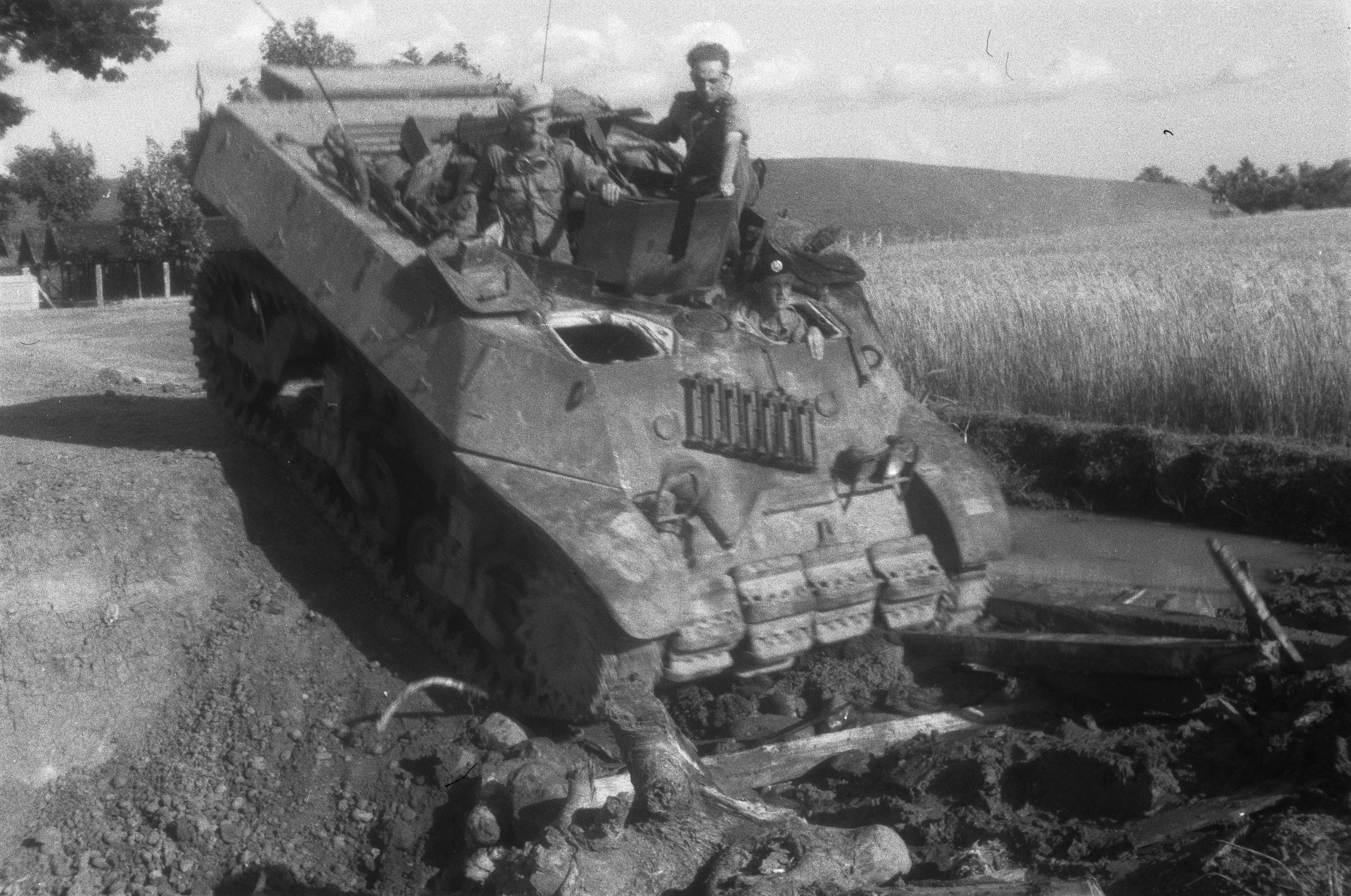
Dutch turretless M3A3 Recce version, in Indonesia

- Stuart Recce

Reconnaissance vehicle based on turretless Stuart.

- Stuart Command

Stuart Kangaroo with extra radios.

- Stuart artillery tractor

Another turretless variant similar in appearance to the Recce and Kangaroo. Used to tow the Ordnance QF 17 pounder. Not to be confused with the US M5 tractor.

=== Brazilian variants ===
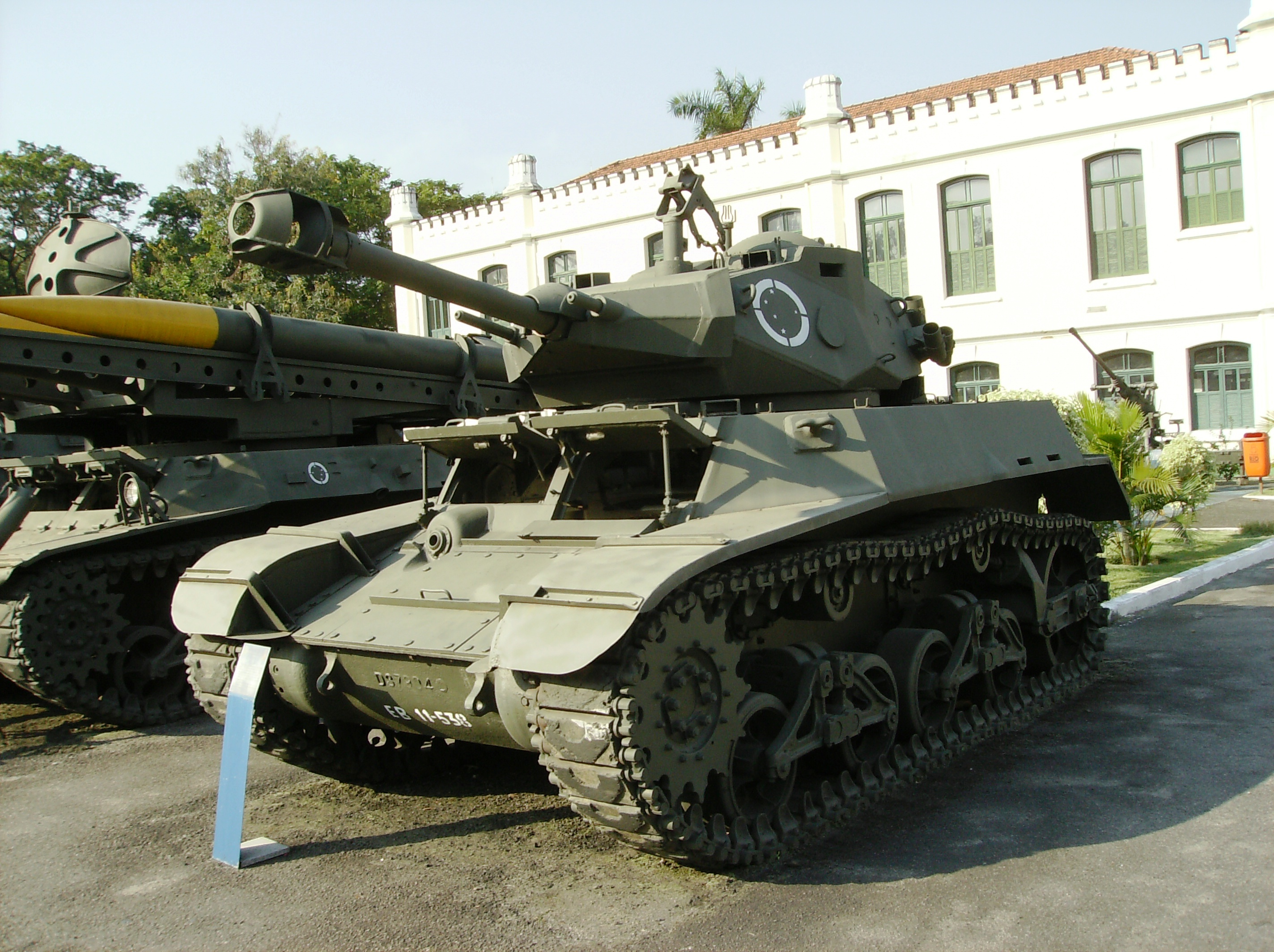
X1A at Conde de Linhares Military Museum, Rio de Janeiro

In the 1970s, the Brazilian company Bernardini developed a series of radical Stuart upgrades for the Brazilian Army.

- X1A

Based on M3A1, this design had new engine (280 hp (210 kW) Saab-Scania diesel), improved suspension, new upper hull armor, fire controls and DEFA 90 mm gun in a new turret. 80 vehicles were produced.

- X1A1

An X1A with improved suspension with three bogies (instead of two) each side and raised idler.

- X1A2

Based on the X1A1, this version retained almost nothing of the original Stuart as even its hull was redesigned. The vehicle weighed 19 short tons (17 t), had crew of 3, was armed with 90 mm gun and powered by Saab-Scania 300 hp (220 kW) diesel. 30 vehicles were produced in 1979–1983.

=== Yugoslav partisans variants ===
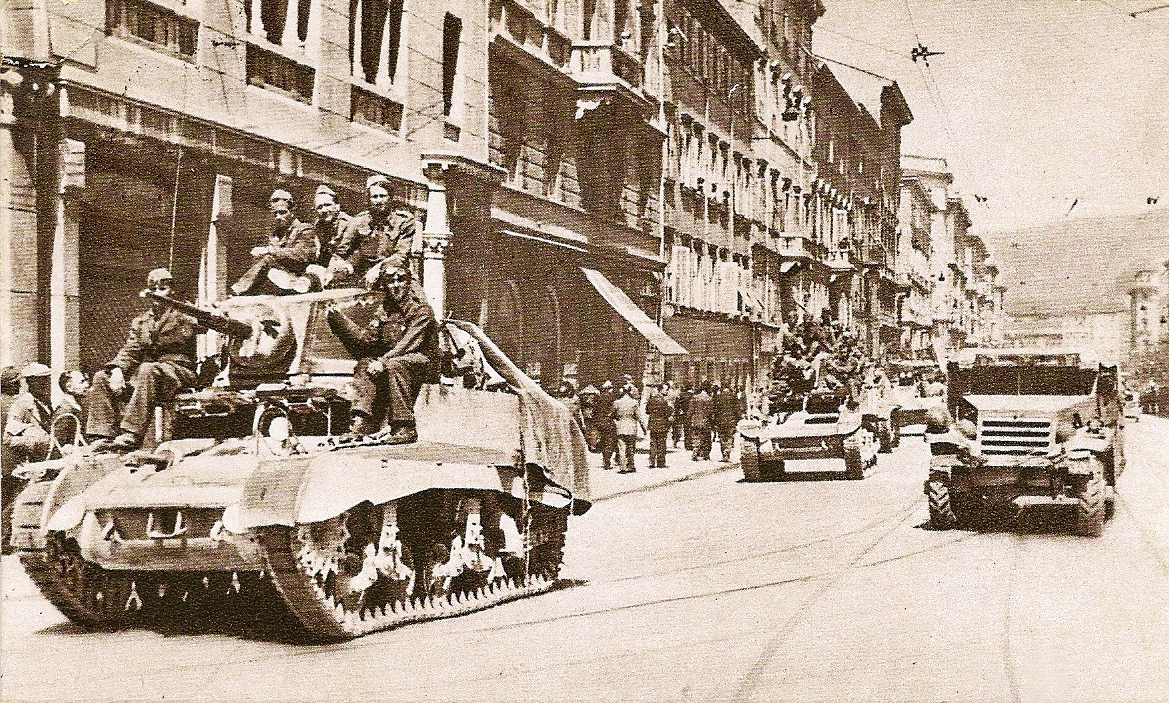
Stuarts of the 1st Tank Brigade, 8th Dalmatian Corps, enter Trieste, 1945

Yugoslav partisans received Stuarts from the British Army. In 1944, obsolete as tanks, many were modified to carry specialized armament:

- M3A1 with 81 mm mortar: 2 built
- M3A1 and M3A3 with 7.5 cm Pak 40 designated SO-75
- M3A3 with four guns Flakvierling 38: 1 built
- M3A3 with 7.5 cm Pak 50: 5 built
- M3A3 with 15 cm sIG 33: 1 built designated SO-150

== Operators ==
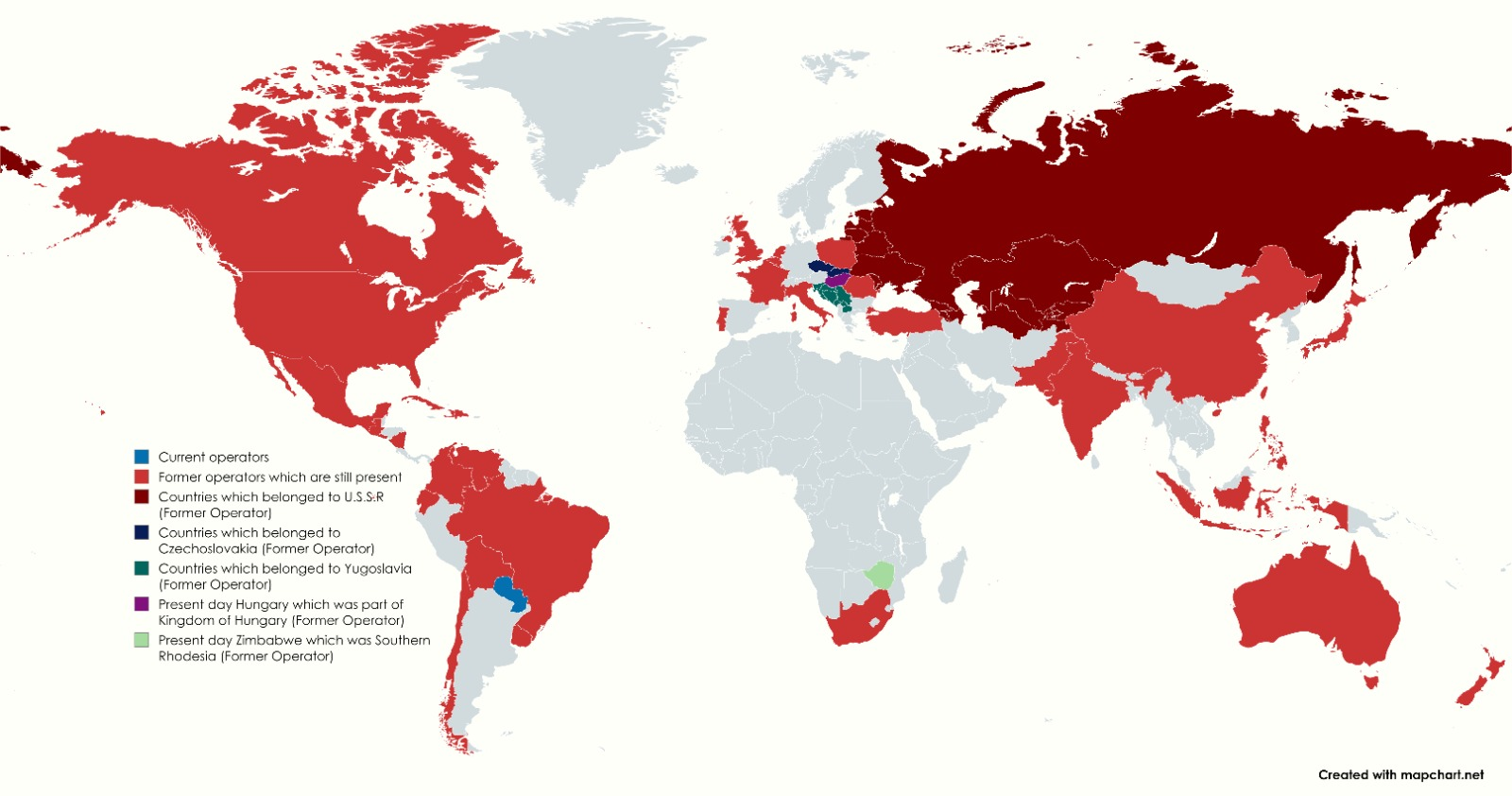
Current and former operators of M3 Stuart light tank Family

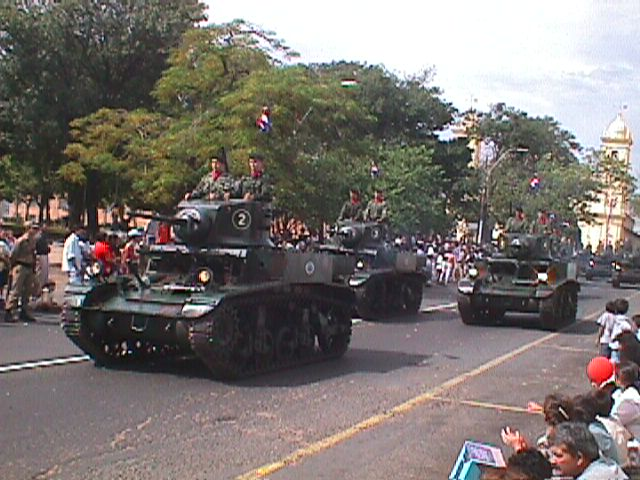
3 M3 Stuart tanks at the Independence Day military parade in Asunción (Paraguay) in 2001

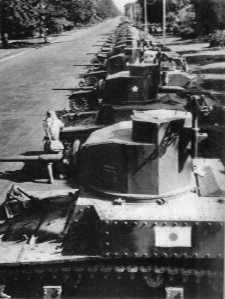
A row of captured M3 Stuart tanks of the Imperial Japanese Army (IJA). Most of the IJA's M3 Stuarts were captured either in the US-controlled Philippines or in British Burma in WWII.

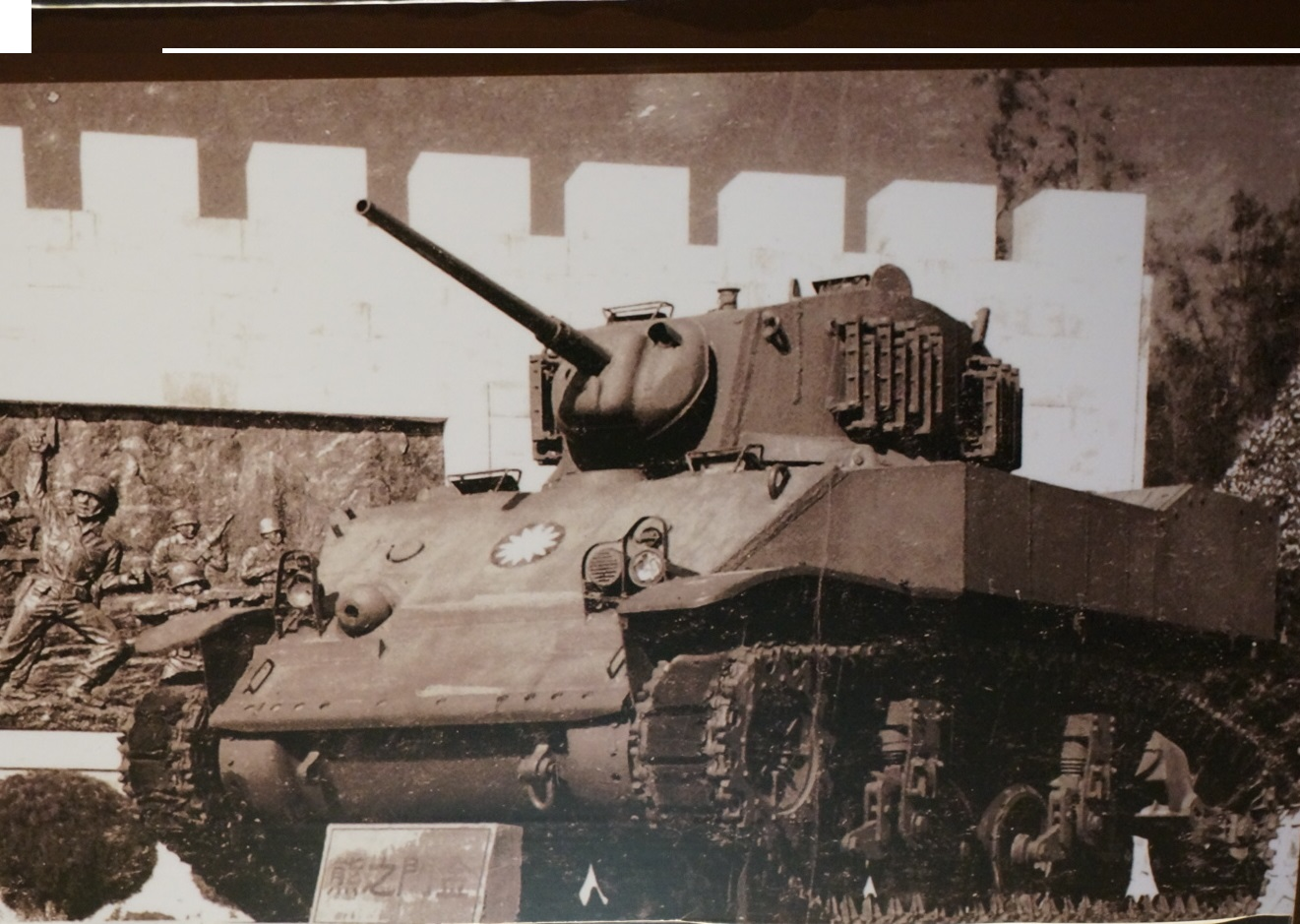
An M5A1 Stuart used by the Republic of China Armed Forces is referred to locally as "The Bear of Kinmen" (Chinese: 金門之熊) because of its outstanding performance against the Chinese People's Liberation Army (PLA) during the Battle of Guningtou following the Chinese Civil War and the exit of the Nationalist forces to Taiwan.

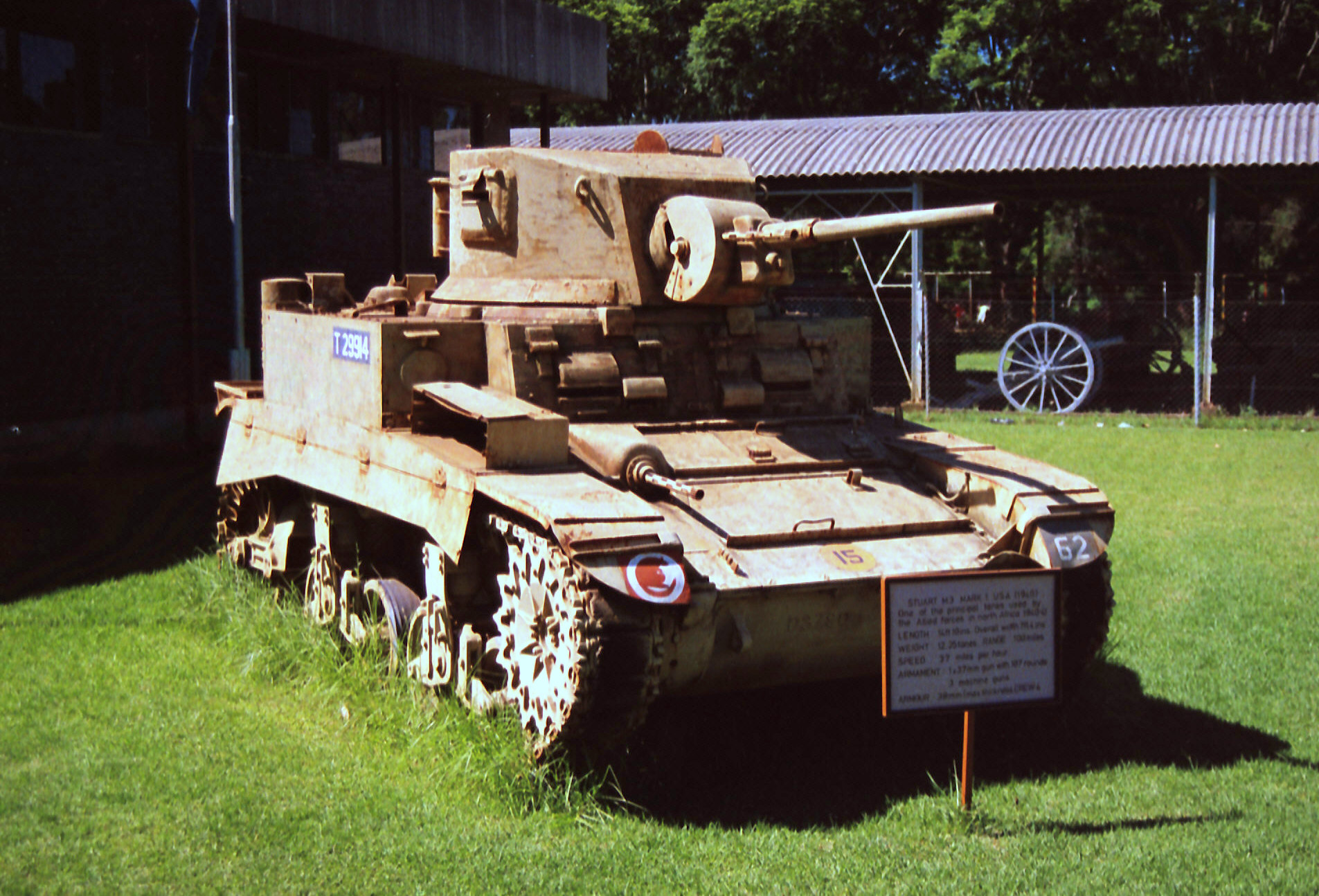
A former Rhodesian Army Stuart tank on display at the Zimbabwe Military Museum in the city of Gweru.

Current operators

- Paraguay — 10 in service (5 M3 and 5 M3A1) and 4 in storage in 2014.

Former operators

- Australia — Around 370.
- Belgium
- Bolivia — 18 M3A1, last 4 donated by Venezuela for training.
- Brazil — 350 M3A2, M3A3/A5.
- Canada — Stuart V (M3A3) tanks were widely used in the reconnaissance troop of armoured regiments. In the 2nd Canadian Armoured Brigade after the Normandy landings, the establishment for each regiment was 49 Sherman tanks, both 75 mm and 17-pounder, and up to 9 Stuart tanks.
- Chile
- People's Republic of China — Some captured from the Nationalist Chinese Army during the Chinese Civil War, but primary received from the Soviet Union.
- Taiwan
- Colombia
- Cuba
- Czechoslovakia
- Dominican Republic
- Ecuador
- El Salvador
- France
- Guatemala — imported from the United States; put into operation around the year 1945.
- Haiti — eight M3A1 and five M5A1.
- Kingdom of Hungary — captured at least three from the Soviets.
- India
- Indonesia — M3A1 and M3A3 from the Netherlands.
- Italy
- Japan — Operated captured vehicles, for example in the Philippines and at the Battle of Imphal.
- Kingdom of Laos – 15 units (M5A1) delivered in 1955 by France used by the Royal Lao Army during the Laotian Civil War (1954-1975); replaced in 1960 by 15 M24 Chaffee light tanks.
- Mexico – Delivered 25 units (M3A1) in 1942, served in the Mexican Army until 1980.
- Netherlands
- New Zealand — The M3A1 was supplied in 1941–42 (89) and some were used in the Pacific. They were withdrawn in 1953–55.
- Nicaragua — four M3A1 were used by the National Guard from the mid-1940s to 1979.
- Pakistan — Received in 1947 after the division of military assets.
- Philippines — Philippine Army 10 M5 Stuart light tanks left behind by American troops from World War II.
- Poland
- Portugal — 70 vehicles in service with the Portuguese Army and other 20 with the Republican National Guard from 1956 to 1972.
- Romania — 21 lend-lease tanks captured from the Soviets in February 1943, others were captured in December 1943. Briefly used by the Romanian Cavalry Corps before being withdrawn due to lack of spare parts. At least five Stuarts were sent to Romania for anti-tank testing in March 1944.
- South Africa
- Southern Rhodesia
- Turkey — 210 British M3s received from 1942 to 1944.
- United Kingdom
- Uruguay 44 tanks were received in 1944 through the EDA (Excess Defense Article) program from 1942 – 1945, were in use for training until 1999.
- United States
- Soviet Union — 1,676 M3 series tanks received as part of Lend-Lease, and 5 M5 series tanks.
- Venezuela
- Yugoslavia — M3A1 and M3A3, used during and after the war.

== Surviving examples ==
Australia
Early M3 (Stuart I), Stuart Mk.3 and M5 Stuart located at the Australian Armour and Artillery Museum, Cairns
M3A1 Hybrid, "Miss Stuart," at the National Military Vehicle Museum in Edinburgh, South Australia
Belgium
M5A1 at Bastogne War Museum
Brazil
X1A at Conde de Linhares Military Museum, Rio de Janeiro
Canada
The Ontario Regiment Museum has an operational M3 Stuart.
M5A1 on display outside St. Catharines Armoury, Ontario. Turret was removed in 1944, and the tank served as a command vehicle for 1st Battalion, Lincoln and Welland Regiment
Early production light tank M5A1 at Worthington Tank Museum
France
M3A3 at the Musée du Mur de l'Atlantique, Ouistreham
75mm Howitzer motor carriage M8 on display at the Musée des Blindés
Indonesia
Indonesian Army retains one M3A1 Stuart in operational condition used for historical theater show.
Israel
Light tank M3A1 in Yad La-Shiryon Museum, Israel
Libya
Light tank M3A1 near the Hauwari battle monument, Kufra Oasis
Russia
Moscow - 9 May 2022: M3 Stuart at the exhibition of military equipment in the Gorky Central Park of Culture and Recreation of Moscow
Kubinka - M3 Stuart in the Central Museum of armored weapons and equipment
Krasnogorsk - 23 February 2016: M3 Stuart at the entrance to the Museum of Technology in Zadorozhnogo. Krasnogorsk, Moscow region.
Verkhnyaya Pyshma - 1 May 2018: M3 Stuart in the Museum of Military Equipment
Serbia
Light tank M3A3 at the Belgrade Military Museum, Serbia
South Africa
Stuart M3A1 'HONEY' at SA Armour Museum
Dickie Fritz MOTH hall in Edenvale
Allan Wilson MOTH Hall near Pietermaritzburg.
SMC Witbank MOTH Hall
Vryheid MOTH Hall
MOTH Hall in Rustenberg
Open Air Display Jan Smuts House Museum
Ditsong National Museum of Military History, Saxonwold, Johannesburg.
Wondermil Military Museum near Wallmansthal
Queen's Fort Military Museum
Marshal Smuts MOTH hall, Somerset West
Queen Nandi Mounted Rifles (used to be Natal Mounted Rifles)
Training Branch, Army Battle School, Lohatla
The Clyde N. Terry Hall of Militaria in Kimberly
Legogotu MOTH Hall, Mbombela.
Rheinmetall Denel Munition, Potchefstroom (Boskop); a gate guard just inside the security area

Taiwan
An M5A1 Stuart used by the Republic of China Armed Forces is referred to locally as "The Bear of Kinmen" (Chinese: 金門之熊) because of its outstanding performance against the Chinese People's Liberation Army (PLA) during the Battle of Guningtou following the Chinese Civil War and the exit of the Nationalist forces to Taiwan.
United Kingdom
M3 Stuart Diesel and M5A1 Stuart at Bovington Tank Museum
United States of America
M3A1 Stuart tank at Aberdeen Proving Ground
M3A1 Stuart tank (Lady Lois) at Stuart Tank Memorial Association, Berwick, Pennsylvania
M3A1 Stuart tank on the town green of New Milford, Connecticut
M3A1 Stuart tank serving as a veteran's memorial located on the main street of Pe Ell, Washington
M3A1 Stuart tank on display at the Texas Military Forces Museum in Austin, Texas
M3A1 Stuart tank at Minnesota Military & Veterans Museum
M3A1 Stuart tank at the Wright Museum in Wolfeboro, New Hampshire
M5 Stuart tank at 5020 W. 95th street in Oak Lawn, Illinois
M5 Stuart tank on East A Street in Brunswick, Maryland
Multiple M5 Stuart tanks in Harmony Church, Fort Moore, Georgia
M5A1 Stuart tank in American Heritage Museum in Hudson, Massachusetts
M5 Stuart tank on 1st Street near Lincoln Highway in DeKalb, Illinois
Zimbabwe
A former Rhodesian Army Stuart tank on display at the Zimbabwe Military Museum in the city of Gweru

== In the media ==
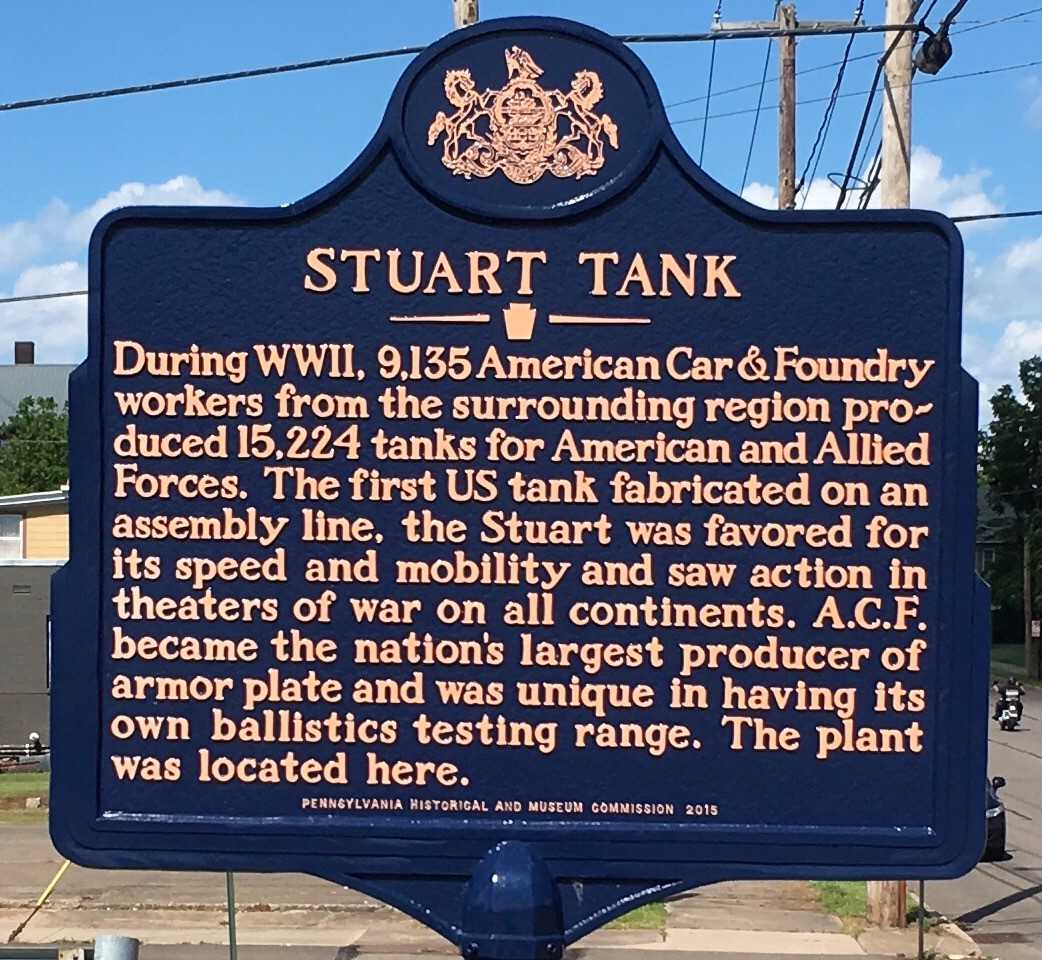
Marker in Berwick, Pennsylvania, where more than 15,000 Stuart tanks were manufactured

- The 1941 US military propaganda short film The Tanks Are Coming features the M3 and its manufacturing process.
- The 1945 Mexican film comedy Un día con el diablo (A Day with the Devil) uses several Mexican Army M3s.
- Modified Stuarts were used in the movie Attack! as German tanks.
- An M3 was the center piece of The Green Hornet episode "Seek, Stalk, & Destroy".
- A "24k gold" M3 was created from gold bullion in the Batman episode "Penguin's Disastrous End". It was stopped with the "Batzooka".
- Season 5 of the TV series The Twilight Zone had an episode "The 7th Is Made Up of Phantoms" featuring an M3 Stuart and its crew going back in time to the Battle of Little Big Horn.
- "Haunted Tank" was a DC Comics feature that appeared in G.I. Combat starring an M3 Stuart. It ran from 1961 to 1987. The tank was "haunted" by the ghost of J.E.B Stuart, who gave cryptic warnings to the crew.
- An M3 was featured in the movie Under Fire as a Nicaraguan National Guard tank.
- The M3 was added to the 2006 strategy game, Company of Heroes, by the Opposing Fronts expansion as a buildable unit for the British.
- A heavily modified M5A1 Stuart was featured in the movie Tank Girl as the eponymous heroine's tank.
- A M5A1 Stuart tank was featured in the James Bond movie Licence to Kill. The tank opens fire on the Chinese hideout in the fictional country Isthmus, and saves Bond.
- The sole operational M3A1 Stuart of the Indonesian Army were featured in the movies Darah Garuda (Blood of Eagles) and Hati Merdeka (Hearts of Freedom), part of the Merah Putih (Red and White) trilogy, as Dutch tank.
- An M3 or M5 was used as a prop German tank in the propaganda film that Steve Rogers was in part way into Captain America: The First Avenger.

== See also ==
- Rhino tank
- SCR-245
- List of U.S. military vehicles by model number
- G-numbers

== Notes ==
Citations
